= Christianity in Egypt =

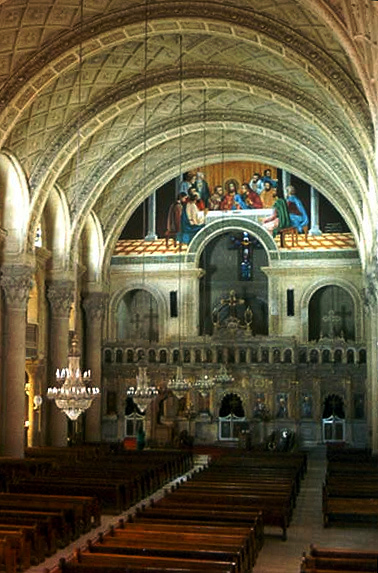
Saint Mark Coptic Orthodox Cathedral in Alexandria

Christianity is the second largest religion in Egypt. The exact number and proportion of Christians in Egypt is disputed, with the country declining to publish religious census data since 2006. (Note: Figures vary, but censuses and other survey based third party analyses estimates the Christian population of Egypt at approximately 5%. Eight consecutive census results from 1927 (8.3% Christian) to 1996 (5.7% Christian) shows a declining trend in Christian population. However censuses may have been under-counting Christians.: The nation-wide Demographic and Health Survey (2008) conducted with the support of US AID showed about 5% of the respondents were Christian.; QScience Connect in 2013 using 2008 data estimated that 5.1% of Egyptians between the ages of 15 and 59 were Copts.; The Pew Foundation estimated 5.1% for Christians in 2010.; Other estimates are not based on surveys, but there is an observed trend among generally reliable sources to safely approximate the Christian population at 10%. Encyclopædia Britannica says that Copts constitute up to 10% of the population of Egypt.; In 2017, CNN estimated the Coptic Christian population between 6 and 11 million. Al-Ahram newspaper, one of the government owned newspapers in Egypt, reported the percentage between 10% and 15% (2017).; In 2018, government agencies including the US department of state estimated the Egyptian Christian population at 9 to 10% (close to 10 million).; In 2019, the National Geographic Society and the Century Foundation estimated that Christians made up 10% of the Egyptian population.)

The vast majority of Egyptian Christians are Copts. In 2018, approximately 90% of Egyptian Christians were Coptic Orthodox.

The history of Egyptian Christianity dates to the Roman era as Alexandria was an early center of Christianity.

== Demographics ==
The vast majority of Egyptian Christians are Copts who belong to the Coptic Orthodox Church of Alexandria, an Oriental Orthodox Church. A 2025 estimate based on data from national surveys conducted in 2006 put the Coptic population in 2020 at 4.8% of the population (roughly 5 million). Other estimates have been higher, up to 9.5 million (figure cited in the Wall Street Journal, 2017) or 10 million (figure cited in the Associated Press, 2019). In 2017, Egyptian state media Al-Ahram estimated Christians at 10–15% out of 104 million, with the vast majority being Coptic Orthodox Christians. Other figures have also been cited, in the range of somewhere between 6% and 18% of the population, with the Egyptian government estimating lower numbers and the Coptic Orthodox Church claiming 15 million Christians living in Egypt. Some claimed that a lack of definite, reliable demographic data renders all estimates uncertain.

In 1998, Youssef Courbage, research director at the French National Institute for Demographic Studies (INED), and Philippe Fargues, a demographer, professor, and emeritus member of the European University Institute (EUI), defended the reliability of official statistics and argued that the Egyptian numbers are consistent both over the whole period and at each individual moment in time. They added that the Western press often accepts overestimates because it has difficulty acknowledging that a minority is a minority.

In 1999, Eric Denis, the Research Director at the French National Centre for Scientific Research (CNRS), studied the Egyptian census and compared it with the registration of births, marriages, and deaths in a random sample of census units, finding them to be consistent. He noted that the local-level data for more than 5,000 villages, towns, and cities remained consistent across 11 censuses. He stated that this could not be the product of a deliberate underestimation passed down over 100 years through generations of civil servants, and added that early estimates of the Christian population provoked no opposition, and were sometimes put forward by the Church itself. According to him, contestation emerged only in the 1970s, when Coptic activists began to use numbers to demand greater political representation. From then on, he stated, the Church and its supporters rejected census results, and proposed figures above 15 percent.

Other than the Coptic Orthodox Church, two other Oriental Orthodox churches have members in Egypt: the Armenian Apostolic and Syriac Orthodox churches.

A minority — approximately 2.5% — of Egyptian Christians belong to the Coptic Catholic Church. In 2007, the Annuario Pontificio estimated the total membership of the Coptic Catholic Church to be 161,327, divided into nine eparchies, with nine bishops and 164 parishes. Other particular churches of the worldwide Catholic Church with members in Egypt include the Melkites, Maronites, Syriac Catholics, Armenian Catholics, and Chaldean Catholics. Most Latin Church Catholics in Egypt are expatriates.

The Greek Orthodox Patriarchate of Alexandria and all Africa is the presence of Eastern Orthodoxy in Egypt. Its membership has steadily declined, and was approximately 110,000 in 1980.

There are a small number of Protestants among Egypt's Christian populations. This includes the Evangelical Church of Egypt (Synod of the Nile), Pentecostals, Anglicans (about half expatriates), and the Armenian Evangelical Church. There are smaller numbers of adherents of the Christian Brethren, Free Methodist, Seventh-Day Adventist, and Churches of Christ, among others. Between 1,000 and 1,500 Jehovah's Witnesses live in Egypt. The Adventist Atlas estimated 852 members of the Seventh-day Adventist Church in Egypt as of 2008.

Scattered among the various churches are a number of converts from Islam to Christianity. A 2015 study estimated that there were 14,000 such believers in Egypt.

Outside of Egypt, there are roughly 1 million members of the Coptic diaspora.

=== Socioeconomic overview ===
Coptic Christians in Egypt are generally characterized by relatively high levels of educational attainment, income, and representation in professional and white-collar occupations, though their participation in security-related institutions remains limited. A 2013 demographic study found that most socioeconomic and health indicators among Copts were broadly comparable to those of Egyptian Muslims. Historical data also suggest that Egyptian Christians have been overrepresented in the country’s middle and upper-middle classes.

Throughout the 19th and early 20th centuries, Copts held significant roles in Egypt’s financial and administrative sectors. They were widely employed as accountants in government offices, and by the 1960s reportedly owned a substantial portion of the country’s banking institutions. In the mid-20th century, Christians were estimated to represent 45% of Egypt’s medical doctors and 60% of its pharmacists.

A 2016 study by the Pew Research Center found that 36% of Egyptian Christians had completed university education, among the highest rates in the Middle East and North Africa.

Several Coptic families have attained significant economic influence, particularly in the private sector. The Sawiris family, through its Orascom conglomerate, became one of Egypt’s most prominent business dynasties in the early 2000s, with interests spanning telecommunications, construction, tourism, and technology. In 2008, Forbes estimated their combined wealth at $36 billion.

Some scholars attribute the high educational and economic profile of the Coptic community to a historical emphasis within the tradition on literacy and the development of human capital.

== History ==
=== Early history ===
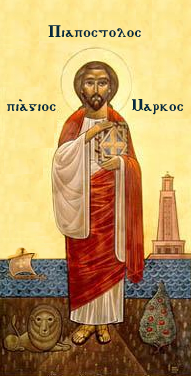
A Coptic icon of Saint Mark, the traditional founder of the Coptic Orthodox Church and first Pope of Alexandria

According to tradition, the Coptic Church was founded by Mark the Evangelist, (Note: The Coptic Church accords with identifying Mark the Evangelist with John Mark, as well as that he was one of the Seventy Disciples sent out by Jesus (Luke 10:1), as Hippolytus confirmed. Coptic tradition also holds that Mark the Evangelist hosted the disciples in his house after Jesus's death, that the resurrected Jesus came to Mark's house (John 20), and that the Holy Spirit descended on the disciples at Pentecost in the same house. Furthermore, Mark is also believed to have been among the servants at the Marriage at Cana who poured out the water that Jesus turned to wine (John 2:1–11).) who was one of the seventy apostles chosen by Jesus and sent out to preach the gospel. He is mentioned in the Book of Acts as a companion of Saint Paul in Antioch and Cyprus, and is ascribed to be the author of the Gospel of Mark. According to the Coptic tradition, Mark was born in Cyrene, a city in the Pentapolis of North Africa (now Libya). This tradition adds that Mark returned to Pentapolis later in life, after being sent by Paul to Colossae (Colossians 4:10; Philemon 24) and serving with him in Rome (2 Timothy 4:11); from Pentapolis he made his way to Alexandria.

According to tradition, in AD 49, about 16 years after the Ascension of Jesus, Mark travelled to Alexandria and founded the Church of Alexandria, having already been in Egypt for 4-5 years. The Coptic Orthodox Church, the Greek Orthodox Church of Alexandria, and the Coptic Catholic Church all trace their origins to this original community. Aspects of the Coptic liturgy (specifically the Liturgy of Saint Cyril) can be traced back to Mark himself. He became the first bishop of Alexandria and he is honoured as the founder of Christianity in Africa. When Mark returned to Alexandria, the pagans of the city resented his efforts to turn the Alexandrians away from the worship of their traditional gods. In AD 68, they placed a rope around his neck and dragged him through the streets until he was dead.

According to Eusebius, Mark was succeeded by Anianus as the bishop of Alexandria in the eighth year of Nero (62/63), probably, but not definitely, due to his coming death. Later Coptic tradition says that he was martyred in 68.

According to Severus ibn al-Muqaffa, the rise of Christianity in Alexandria in the second half of the first century was accompanied by persecution by the Romans, so much so that after the departure of the third Pope of Alexandria Avilius in 93 AD, a new pope could not be chosen until 95 AD. This pope, Kedron, was himself martyred under the emperor Trajan. Despite this, the bishops elected a new pope, indicating that the church had such a powerful base that no amount of persecution, not even the murder of the pope himself, could overcome it.

=== The Rise of Christianity ===
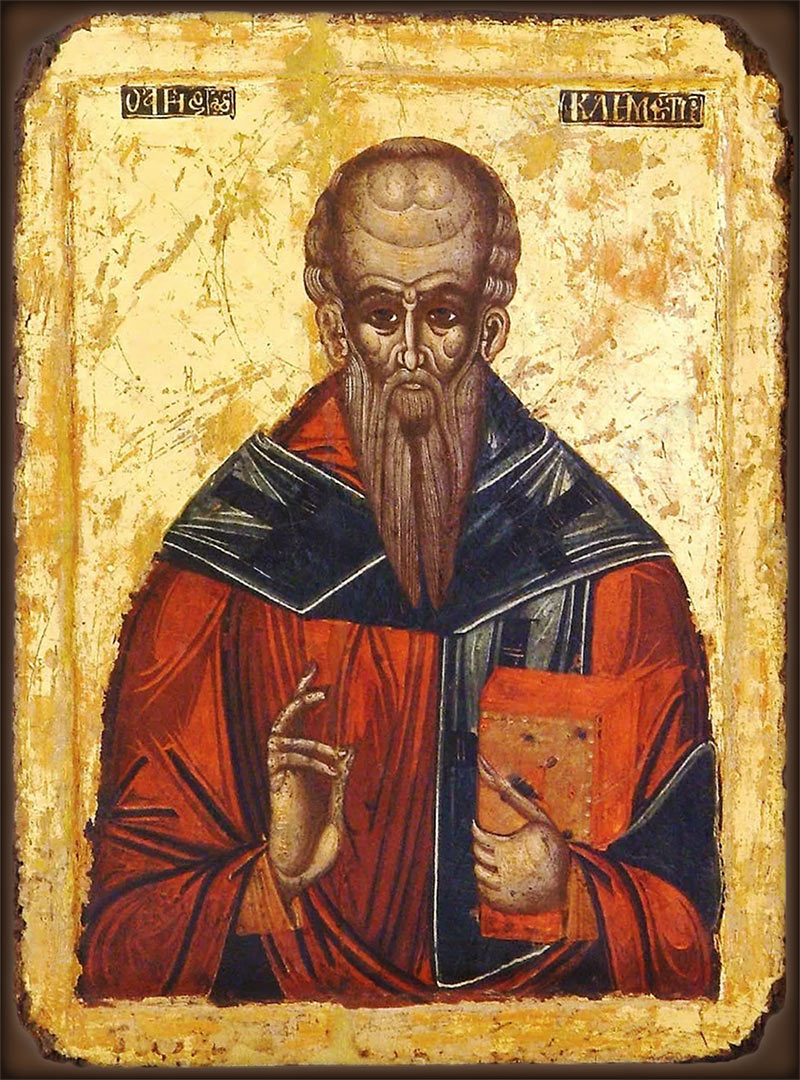
An icon of Saint Clement of Alexandria, who taught at the Catechetical School of Alexandria

Pope Primus was elected as the 5th Pope of Alexandria in 106 AD, and the Catechetical School of Alexandria arose in his days, as did the number of churches in Egypt and beyond, despite the emperor Hadrian continuing the persecution of Christians. The next two popes, Justus and Eumenes, were also Deans of the Catechetical School of Alexandria. The persecutions by Hadrian intensified during their pontificates, but subsided during that of the next two popes, Markianos and Celadion, due to the ascension of the relatively tolerant emperor Marcus Aurelius. Since the middle of the second century, the Catechetical School has produced many Church Fathers whose writings are still read and studied today, including Origen and Clement of Alexandria, as well as Saints Pantaenus and Athenagoras. Some of the most important Church Fathers in the West, such as Saints Augustine and Jerome, were influenced by the School of Alexandria too. Another milestone of the second century was the first Bible translations into Coptic from its original Koine Greek. Coptic was, along with Syriac and Latin, one of the earliest languages the New Testament was translated into.

Pope Demetrius (188-230) established a liturgical calendar by which fasts and feast days were determined. He was engaged in the controversy over the canonical calculation of Easter, and was the first to apply the calculation method for determining the date of Easter. His method was later approved by the Council of Nicea, which made one of the duties of the patriarch of Alexandria to determine the dates of the Easter and to announce it to the other Christian churches. This duty fell on this officiate because of the erudition at Alexandria he could draw on.

Pope Demetrius died in 230 after a long pontificate, and neither his pontificate nor that of his predecessor Julian (178-188) saw any violent persecution of Christians, except that the restrictions against them were not lifted, and he had warned the bishops against leaving Alexandria. Despite this, the Pope would secretly leave to ordain new priests in other cities and villages. By 300, about a quarter of the population in the eastern half of the Roman Empire was Christian.

During the second century, the Church also fought against Gnosticism, which syncretized Christianity with the beliefs that had prevailed before it. Its monks engaged in meditation and philosophy in pursuit of spiritual knowledge (gnosis), which they believed could be attained solely by human effort without God's help. Gnostic beliefs were not well understood to historians until the discovery of their writings, such as the Nag Hammadi library, in the 20th century. The gnostics wrote false gospels and ascribed them to Biblical figures. For example, the Gospel of Judas portrays Jesus' betrayer Judas Iscariot as a partner in salvation and redemption. The Church Fathers, such as Origen and Clement of Alexandria, produced anti-Gnostic writings which contributed to the fall of the movement, although it would take several centuries to completely disappear.

=== The Era of Martyrs ===
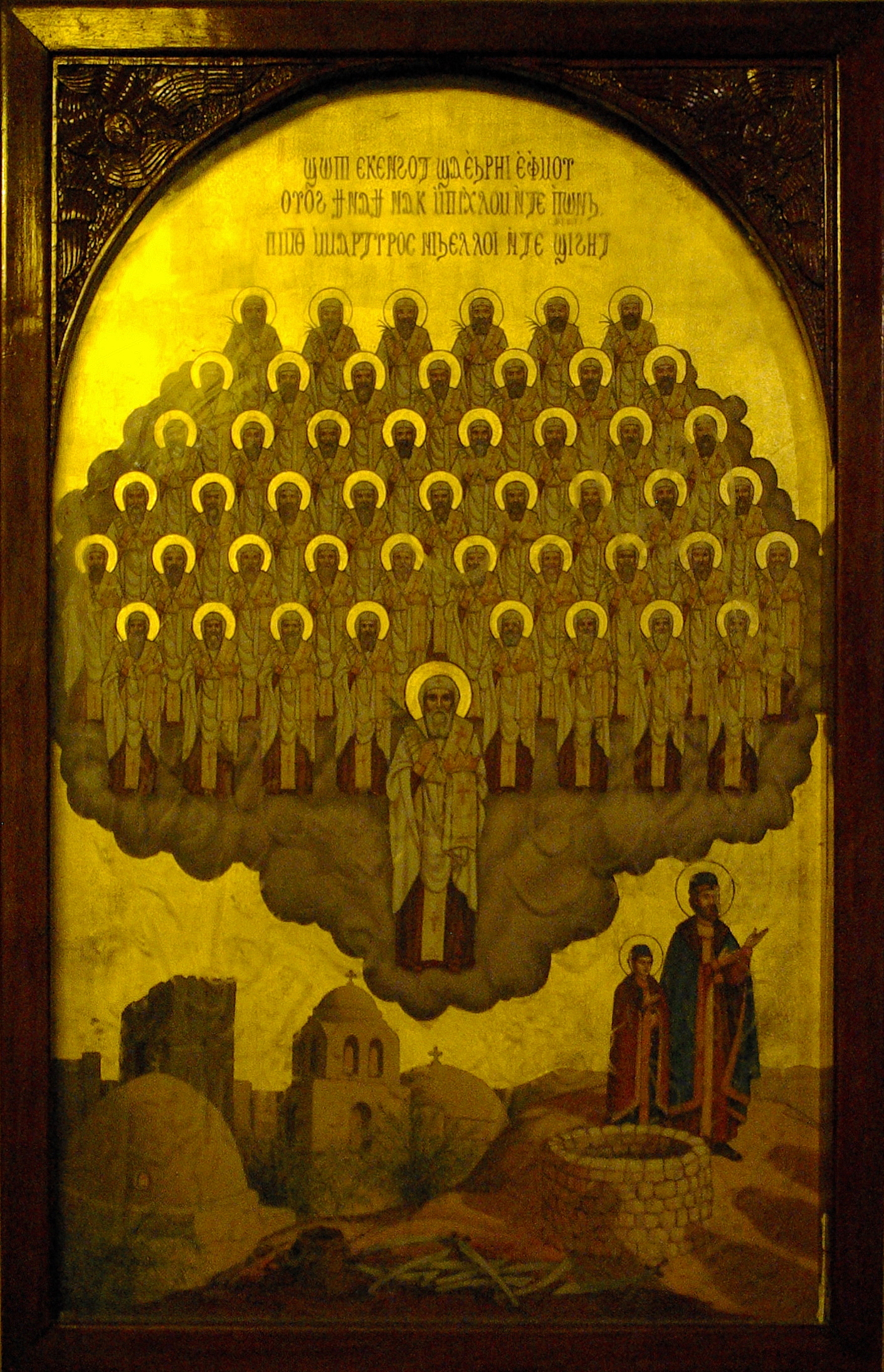
A Coptic icon of the Forty-Nine Martyrs of Scetis at the Monastery of Saint Macarius the Great in Wadi El Natrun, who were massacred by Berbers during a raid in 444

The main problem suffered by the church in the second and third centuries was their persecution by the Roman Empire. From the expulsion of Jews and Christians from Rome around 50 AD to the Edict of Milan in 313 AD, the Christians suffered various persecutions, the harshest of which were the Neronian persecution and the Diocletianic Persecution. Christian history refers to the persecutions of Nero, Domitian, Trajan, Marcus Aurelius, Septimius Severus, Maximinus, Decius, Valerian, Aurelian and Diocletian as the "Ten Great Persecutions".

Christian teachings conflicted with Roman beliefs regarding the deification and worship of Roman emperors, and Christians refused to serve in the Roman army and took Sabbath days off to perform religious rites. Roman authorities thus saw Christians as anti-state criminals, and Christianity as a subversive religion that threatened the safety and security of the empire. Therefore, they banned Christian gatherings and organised persecutions against Christians, which reached their height under Diocletian (r. 284–305). The Christians faced this persecution with strength and endurance, with thousands choosing to suffer torture and death over denying their faith in Christ. The Coptic Church began counting the years, the Era of the Martyrs, from the beginning of Diocletian's reign, and commemorates the martyrs on Nayrouz, which is the beginning of the year in the Coptic calendar.

The situation for Christians greatly improved after Emperor Constantine's Edict of Milan legalised Christianity in 313 AD, and Emperor Theodosius's Edict of Thessalonica made it the state church of the Empire in 380 AD.

From the 3rd century onwards, Egyptian Christianity fostered the Desert Fathers and thus originated a major and influential tradition of ascetic monasticism in the Christian Church overall.

=== The Byzantine Empire ===
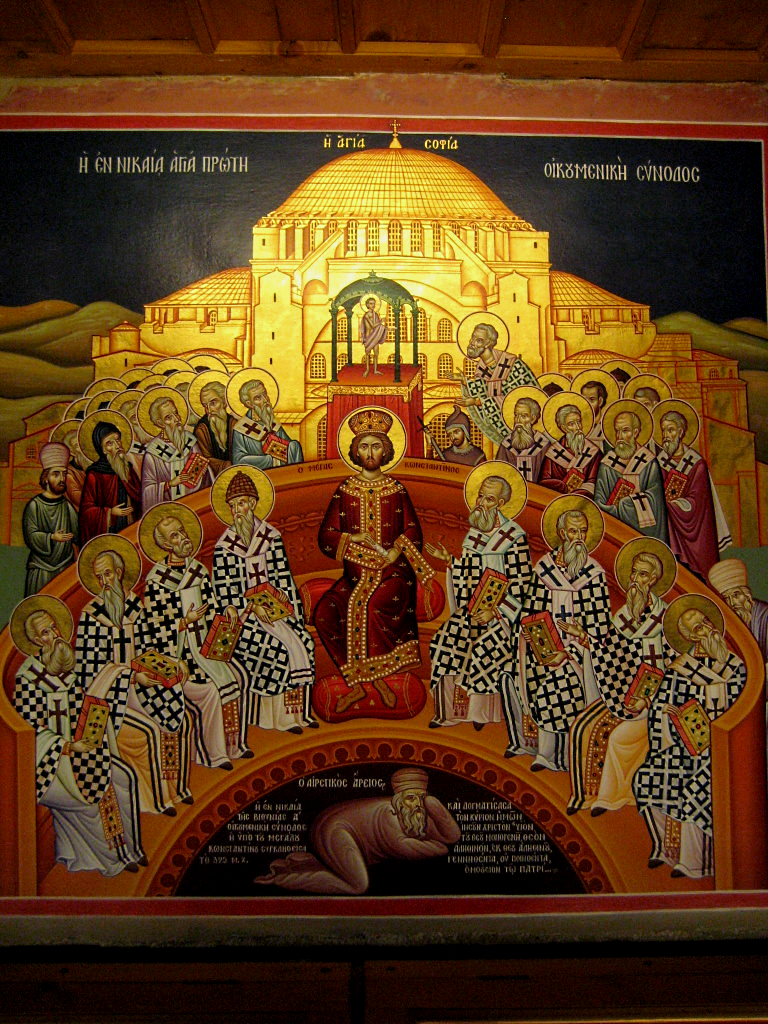
The First Council of Nicaea, with Arius depicted beneath the feet of emperor Constantine the Great and the bishops

In 318, only 5 years after the end of the Diocletianic Persecution, an Alexandrian priest named Arius claimed that Jesus Christ was not coeternal with God the Father, but was rather created before time. This view, called Arianism, was opposed by Pope Alexander and his then-deacon Athanasius, who would later succeed him as Pope. The resulting controversy led the Emperor Constantine to convene an ecumenical council, the First Council of Nicaea, which 318 bishops attended according to tradition. After two months of debating and searching the Bible, all but two of them agreed that Arius' view was heretical, and they had Arius excommunicated. To outline the correct Orthodox belief, they wrote the Nicene Creed, which affirms that Jesus is "true God", that he is "begotten, not made", and that he is "of one essence with the Father".

The conflict between Arians and the Orthodox Church continued after the Council of Nicea, and was so intense that Athanasius was exiled five times by four different Roman emperors during his 45-year-long pontificate (328-373), spending 17 of those years in exile. In Coptic literature, Athanasius is the first patriarch of Alexandria to use Coptic as well as Greek in his writings. Other heresies which arose later were addressed at the Council of Constantinople in 381 AD, which made additions to the Nicene Creed, including the section about the Holy Spirit.

In the early 5th century, the Archbishop of Constantinople Nestorius rejected the concept of the Hypostatic union, instead claiming that there are two distinct hypostases in the Incarnate Christ, the one Divine and the other human. As such, he refused the title Theotokos (God – Bearer), used for Saint Mary, instead using "Christotokos". Pope Cyril of Alexandria strongly opposed him and defended the use of the title Theotokos. Nestorius was deposed at the Council of Ephesus in 431 AD.

In 446, an aged monk from Constantinople called Eutyches began teaching that Christ only has one nature. In reaction to Nestorianism, he had adopted an extreme view in the opposite direction. Eutyches was condemned and exiled by a synod presided over by Flavian, Bishop of Constantinople, who also sent a full account to Leo, Pope of Rome. Eutyches appealed to Dioscorus, Pope of Alexandria, who, under the impression that Eutyches had repented, held his own synod annulling Flavian's ruling and absolving Eutyches. The Emperor Theodosius II convened a council, the Second Council of Ephesus, in which Dioscorus reinstated Eutyches and deposed Flavian, as well as Eusebius of Dorylaeum, Theoderet of Cyrrus, Ibas of Edessa, and Domnus II of Antioch. Flavian died shortly afterward, and Dioscorus was accused of killing him. Leo, who could not attend the council himself, wrote a letter called Leo's Tome explaining his views on the doctrinal issues involved, which Dioscorus considered Nestorian. After Emperor Theodosius died, the new emperor and empress Marcian and Pulcheria convened another council, the Council of Chalcedon, in 451. This council deposed Pope Dioscorus and had him exiled to Gangra. It also read Leo's Tome and declared it orthodox, despite its contradictions with Pope Cyril's teachings, specifically the third of his Twelve Anathemas.

The near-immediate result of the council was a major schism. The bishops who were uneasy with the language of Pope Leo's Tome repudiated the council, saying that the acceptance of two physes was tantamount to Nestorianism. Dioscorus of Alexandria advocated miaphysitism and had dominated the Council of Ephesus. Churches that rejected Chalcedon in favor of Ephesus broke off from the rest of the Eastern Church in a schism, the most significant among these being the Church of Alexandria, today known as the Coptic Orthodox Church. The rise of the "so-called" monophysitism in the East (as branded by the West) was led by the Copts of Egypt.

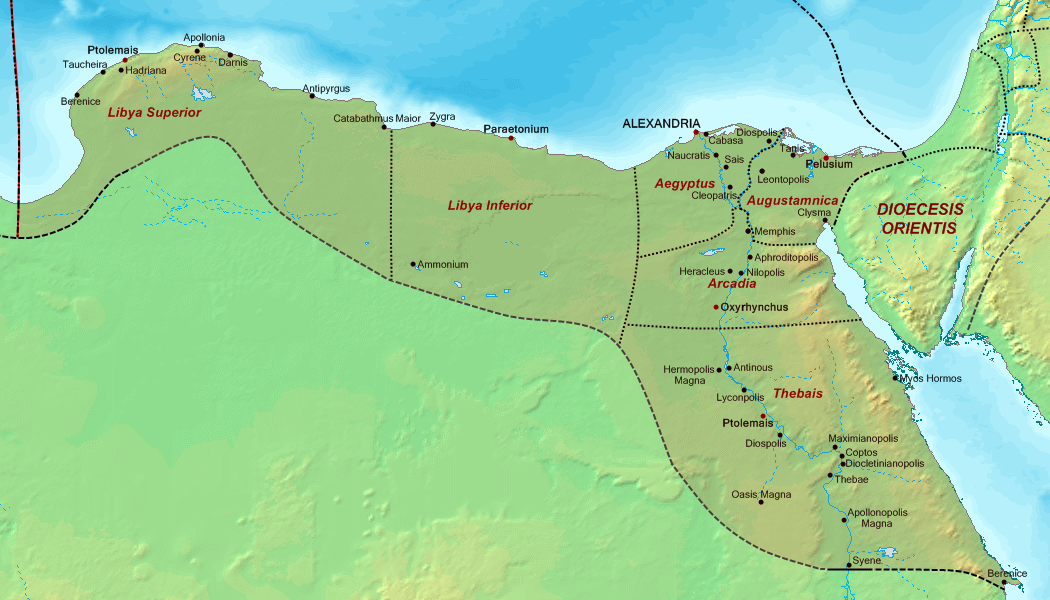
The Diocese of Egypt (c. 400 AD)

Most (but not all) of the emperors in this period were Chalcedonians. Some of them persecuted the non-Chalcedonian Church, while others attempted to resolve the schism. In 482, Emperor Zeno made an attempt to reconcile christological differences between the supporters and opponents of the Chalcedonian Definition by issuing an imperial decree known as the Henotikon, but those efforts were mainly politically motivated and ultimately proved to be unsuccessful in reaching a true and substantial reconciliation. In 518, the new Byzantine Emperor Justin I (who accepted Chalcedon), demanded that the entire Church in the Roman Empire accept the Council's decisions. Justin ordered the replacement of all non-Chalcedonian bishops, including the patriarchs of Antioch and Alexandria.

During the reign of emperor Justinian I (527–565), whose wife Theodora was non-Chalcedonian, new attempts were made towards reconciliation. One of the most prominent Oriental Orthodox theologians of that era was Severus of Antioch. In spite of several, imperially sponsored meetings between heads of Oriental Orthodox and Eastern Orthodox communities, no final agreement was reached. The most notable persecution of Copts during this period was by the staunch monothelitist Cyrus of Alexandria.

=== Under Muslim rule ===
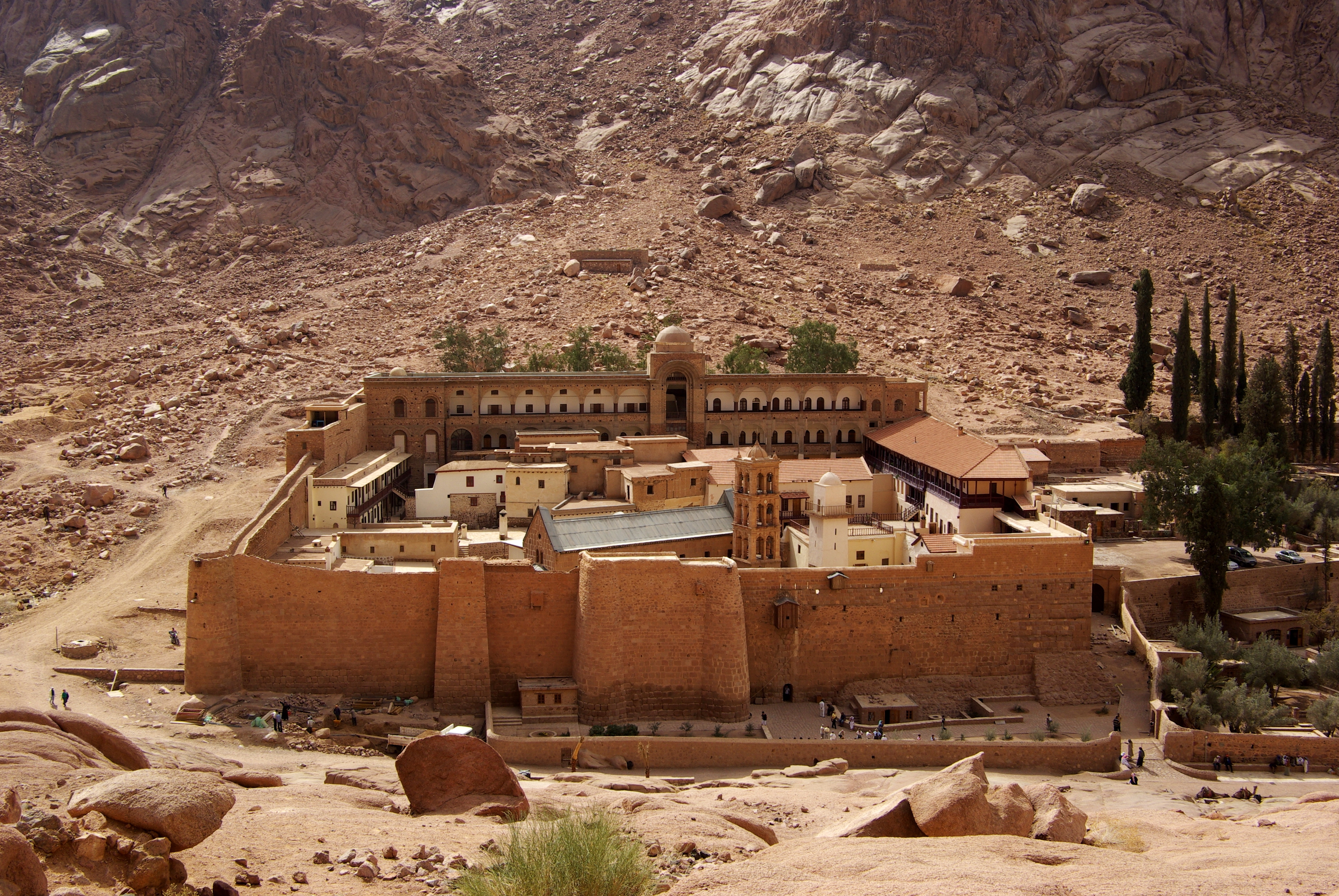
Saint Catherine's Monastery--the oldest Christian (Orthodox) monastery in Egypt.

Egypt as well as some other Asian and African Byzantine territories were conquered by Muslims in the 7th century. Under Muslim rule, the Copts were cut off from the mainstream of Christianity and were compelled to adhere to the Pact of Umar covenant. They were assigned to Dhimmi status. Under the rule of the Bahri Mamluks, many Christians were forcefully converted and persecuted across Egypt. Their position improved dramatically in the early 19th century under the rule of Muhammad Ali. He abolished the Jizya (a tax on non-Muslims) and allowed Copts to enroll in the army. Pope Cyril IV, 1854–61, reformed the church and encouraged broader Coptic participation in Egyptian affairs. Khedive Isma'il Pasha, in power 1863–79, further promoted the Copts. He appointed them judges to Egyptian courts and awarded them political rights and representation in government. They flourished in business affairs.

The first Anglican presence in Egypt was established in 1819 by missionaries from the Church Mission Society, who endeavored to distribute copies of the Gospels in Arabic. The first Anglican church in Egypt, called St. Mark's was consecrated on 17 December 1839, in Alexandria, followed by All Saint's Church, in Cairo, consecrated on 23 January 1876.

The Evangelical Presbyterian Church of Egypt, Synod of the Nile was founded by American missionaries from the United Presbyterian Church of North America, ministering among members of the Coptic Orthodox Church in 1854, the church would later become autonomous in 1926. By 1998, the Synod had more than 300 churches, a seminary and a "large system of church related secondary schools."

Some Copts participated in the Egyptian national movement for independence and occupied many influential positions. Two significant cultural achievements include the founding of the Coptic Museum in 1910 and the Higher Institute of Coptic Studies in 1954. Some prominent Coptic thinkers from this period are Salama Moussa, Louis Awad and Secretary-General of the Wafd Party Makram Ebeid.

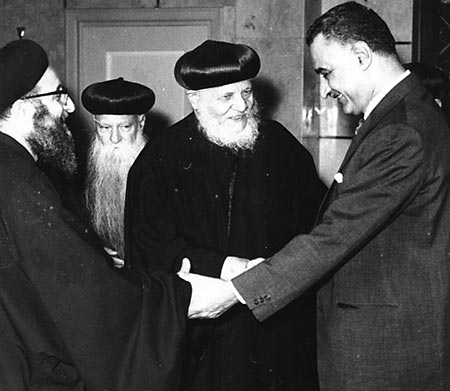
President Nasser welcomes a delegation of Coptic bishops (1965)

In 1952, Gamal Abdel Nasser led some army officers in a coup d'état against King Farouk, which overthrew the Kingdom of Egypt and established a republic. Nasser's mainstream policy was pan-Arab nationalism and socialism. The Copts were severely affected by Nasser's nationalization policies, though they represented about 10–20% of the population. In addition, Nasser's pan-Arab policies undermined the Copts' strong attachment to and sense of identity about their Egyptian pre-Arab, and certainly non-Arab identity which resulted in permits to construct churches to be delayed along with Christian religious courts to be closed.

By January 1976, the Diocese of Egypt had become part of the Episcopal / Anglican Province of Jerusalem and the Middle East, and in May 2020, the Episcopal / Anglican Province of Alexandria became the 41st Province of the Anglican Communion.

On 18 February 2013, the leaders of the five largest denominations in Egypt — the Coptic Orthodox Church, the Greek Orthodox Church, the Roman Catholic Church, the Protestant Church and the Anglican Church — formed the first Council of Churches in Egypt. In attendance were the patriarchs of the Coptic Orthodox Church, Tawadros II, the Greek Orthodox Church, Theodore II of Alexandria, and the Coptic Catholic Church, Ibrahim Isaac Sidrak.

== Persecution and discrimination ==
=== Historical ===
Egyptian Christians, particularly those who adhered to the Miaphysite doctrine that would come to define Coptic Orthodoxy, experienced prolonged periods of persecution from the third century onward. Under Roman rule, systematic repression began with the Edict of Decius and reached its height during the reign of Emperor Diocletian (r. 284–305), whose brutal campaigns against Christians resulted in mass executions. This era, memorialized in the Coptic calendar as the "Era of the Martyrs," became foundational to Coptic identity. Further hardship followed the Council of Chalcedon in 451 CE, whose Christological definition was rejected by the majority of Egyptian Christians. Their resistance to Chalcedonian doctrine prompted persecution by the Byzantine Empire, particularly under emperors Marcian and Leo I the Thracian. This culminated in intensified repression during the patriarchate of Cyrus of Alexandria, especially amid the Monothelite controversy, and continued until the Muslim conquest of Egypt.

Following the Muslim conquest of Egypt (639–641 CE), Christians were designated as dhimmi, a protected class under Islamic law permitted to practice their religion in exchange for paying the jizya tax and refraining from military service. While this arrangement initially afforded a degree of religious autonomy, over time discriminatory practices intensified, and social and economic pressures contributed to the gradual Islamization of Egypt’s population.

In the early 11th century, the Coptic Orthodox Church faced significant persecution under the sixth Fatimid Caliph, Al-Hakim bi-Amr Allah. During his reign, Al-Hakim is reported to have ordered the destruction of as many as 3,000 churches, and implemented measures that adversely affected religious minorities, including the prohibition of wine, which was essential to both Christian and Jewish religious rituals. In 1005, he imposed the ghiyār ("law of differentiation"), mandating that Christians and Jews wear distinctive clothing, including a black belt (zunnār or mintaq) and a black turban (ʿimāmah). In 1009, Al-Hakim ordered the destruction of the Church of the Holy Sepulchre in Jerusalem, one of the most sacred sites in Christianity.

=== Contemporary ===
A choir of Coptic Christian church servants

Christians in Egypt, primarily members of the Coptic Orthodox Church, constitute the country’s largest religious minority and have long faced legal, social, and institutional discrimination. Although the Egyptian constitution guarantees freedom of religion, in practice, Christians encounter unequal treatment. Converts to Islam face no legal obstacles, while Muslims seeking to convert to Christianity often face bureaucratic delays, denial of identity documents, or detention. A 2008 court ruling allowed some converts to revert to Christianity, but their official records still note prior conversions.

Church construction was historically restricted, requiring presidential approval even for minor repairs. While a 2005 reform devolved some authority to governors, major change came with the 2016 Church Construction Law, which has since led to the legalization of thousands of churches.

Copts have been the target of sectarian violence, most notably after the 2013 coup, when numerous churches and Christian institutions were attacked. Rights groups documented waves of incitement, arson, and mob violence, often met with inadequate state protection or legal recourse. Concerns also remain about the abduction and forced conversion of Coptic women and girls. However, according to Sebastian Elsässer, who holds a PhD from the Free University of Berlin, some activists tended to base their claims of persecution on highly charged but poorly substantiated evidence, and independent observers found accounts of the forced conversion of Christian girls to be largely fabricated or distorted.

Furthermore, recent years have shown signs of progress. Christians have reported greater freedom to construct and renovate churches, and new initiatives, such as interreligious reconciliation efforts and protective fatwas, have emerged. Egypt’s position on Open Doors’ World Watch List, which ranks the 50 countries where Christians face the most persecution, fell from 25th in 2013 to 42th by 2026, indicating a measurable decline in reported persecution. However, social discrimination and underrepresentation in public institutions continue to affect the community.

Since July 2025, Said Mansour Rezk Abdelrazek, a Christian convert from Islam, has been detained in an Egyptian prison on charges of "contempt" for Islam, inciting "public disorder", disseminating "false information", and joining a banned "terrorist" organization that Abdelrazek's lawyer says doesn't even exist. He's facing a maximum pentalty of 25 years in prison or even the death penalty. His wife denounced that Abdelrazek has been tortured in prison and she has asked for international help, particularly from the U.S. and the Netherlands.

On 3 January 2026, Coptic YouTuber Augustinos Samaan was sentenced to five years in prison with hard labor on charges of "contempt of religion and misuse of social media". Later in May, he appealed the sentence.

== Notable Egyptian Christians ==
- Albert Cossery (1913–2008), writer, of Syrian descent.
- Anoushka (born 1960), singer, of Armenian descent.
- Boutros Ghali (1846-1910), politician, Prime Minister of Egypt 1908-1910.
- Boutros Boutros-Ghali (1922-2016), diplomat, Secretary-General of the United Nations 1992-1996.
- Charlotte Wassef (1912-1988), beauty queen, Miss Universe 1935.
- Demis Roussos (1946-2015), musician, of Greek descent.
- Ester Fanous (1895-1990), activist and feminist.
- Henry Barakat (1914-1997), film director, of Levantine descent.
- Lina Attalah (born 1983), journalist and media figure.
- Magdi Yacoub (born 1935), physician, professor of cardiothoracic surgery at Imperial College London.
- Mena Massoud (born 1991), actor.
- Naguib Sawiris (born 1954), billionaire businessman, chair of Weather Investments.
- Nassef Sawiris (born 1961), billionaire businessman, owner of Orascom Construction.
- Nelly (born 1951), entertainer, of Armenian descent.
- Omar Sharif (1932-2015), actor.
- Rami Malek (born 1981), American actor, son of Coptic immigrants.
- Samih Sawiris (born 1957), billionaire businessman, chair of Orascom Development Holding.
- Vassula Rydén (1942–2024), author and mystic, of Greek descent.
- Youssef Wahba Pasha GCMG (1852–1934), politician, Prime Minister of Egypt 1919-1920.

Further notable Egyptian Christian people can be found under specific lists:

- List of Copts
- List of Egyptian Armenians

== See also ==
- Religion in Egypt
- Coptic Orthodox Church
- Catholic Church in Egypt
- Protestantism in Egypt
- List of Coptic Orthodox churches in Egypt
- Copts
- Christianity in Sohag Governorate

== Sources ==
- Brakke, David (2008). "The East: Egypt and Palestine". The Oxford Handbook of Early Christian Studies. Oxford: Oxford University Press. pp. 344–364. ISBN 978-0-19-927156-6. Archived from the original on 2 August 2023.
- Corbon, Jean (1998). "The Churches of the Middle East: Their Origins and Identity, from their Roots in the Past to their Openness to the Present". Christian Communities in the Arab Middle East: The Challenge of the Future. Oxford: Clarendon Press. pp. 92–110. ISBN 978-0-19-829388-0. Archived from the original on 2 August 2023.
- Dick, Iganatios (2004). Melkites: Greek Orthodox and Greek Catholics of the Patriarchates of Antioch, Alexandria and Jerusalem. Roslindale, MA: Sophia Press. Archived from the original on 8 June 2023.
- Grillmeier, Aloys (1975) [1965]. Christ in Christian Tradition: From the Apostolic Age to Chalcedon (451). Vol. 1 (2nd revised ed.). Atlanta: John Knox Press. ISBN 9780664223014. Archived from the original on 23 April 2023.
- Grillmeier, Aloys; Hainthaler, Theresia (1996). Christ in Christian Tradition: The Church of Alexandria with Nubia and Ethiopia after 451. Vol. 2/4. Louisville: Westminster John Knox Press. ISBN 9780664223007. Archived from the original on 23 April 2023.
- Meyendorff, John (1989). Imperial Unity and Christian Divisions: The Church 450–680 A.D. Crestwood, NY: St. Vladimir's Seminary Press. ISBN 9780881410563. Archived from the original on 12 January 2023.
- Ostrogorsky, George (1956). History of the Byzantine State. Oxford: Basil Blackwell. Archived from the original on 23 April 2023.
- Panchenko, Constantin A. (2021). Orthodoxy and Islam in the Middle East: The Seventh to the Sixteenth Centuries. Jordanville, NY: Holy Trinity Publications. ISBN 9781942699330. Archived from the original on 2 August 2023.
- Roussos, Sotiris (2010). "Eastern Orthodox Christianity in the Middle East". Eastern Christianity in the Modern Middle East. London-New York: Routledge. pp. 107–119. ISBN 9781135193713. Archived from the original on 2 August 2023.
