= Of Alexandria =

This article lists people, events and other subjects which are referred to as "of Alexandria".

== of Alexandria ==
- Ammonius of Alexandria (3rd century AD), a Greek philosopher from Alexandria and one of the founders of Neoplatonism.
- Appian of Alexandria (c. 95 – c. 165), a Roman historian
- Athanasius of Alexandria (c. 293 – 2 May 373), also given the titles Athanasius the Great, Pope Athanasius I of Alexandria, and Athanasius the Apostolic, was a Christian theologian, bishop of Alexandria, Church Father, and a noted Egyptian leader of the fourth century.
- Carpocrates of Alexandria, the founder of an early Gnostic sect from the first half of the second century.
- Catherine of Alexandria (c. 282 - c. 305), a Christian saint and martyr.
- Clement of Alexandria (c.150 - c. 215), a Christian theologian and the head of the noted Catechetical School of Alexandria
- Ctesibius of Alexandria (fl. 285–222 BC), a Greek inventor and mathematician in Alexandria, Ptolemaic Egypt.
- Cyril of Alexandria (c. 376 - 444), the Pope of Alexandria from 412 to 444.
- Cyrus of Alexandria (died about 641) a Melchite patriarch.
- Diophantus of Alexandria b. between 200 and 214 CE, d. between 284 and 298 CE), sometimes called "the father of algebra", an Alexandrian Greek mathematician.
- Euclid of Alexandria (fl 300BC), a Greek mathematician, often referred to as the "Father of Geometry".
- Saint Eulogius of Alexandria Greek Patriarch from 580 to 608.
- Eustochius of Alexandria
- Hero of Alexandria (c. 10–70 CE). an ancient Greek mathematician.
- Herophilos of Alexandria (335-280 BC), a Greek physician
- Hesychius of Alexandria, a grammarian who flourished probably in the 5th century CE.
- Hypatia of Alexandria (AD 350 and 370; died March 415), a Greek scholar.
- Isidore of Alexandria an Egyptian or Greek philosopher and one of the last of the Neoplatonists
- Menelaus of Alexandria (c. 70–140 CE), a Greek mathematician and astronomer.
- Nemesius of Alexandria (c. A.D. 390), a Christian philosopher, and the author of a treatise De Natura Hominis ("On Human Nature").
- Origen of Alexandria (185-254), an early Christian scholar and theologian, and one of the most distinguished writers of the early Christian Church.
- Pappus of Alexandria (c. 290 – c. 350), one of the last great Greek mathematicians of antiquity.
- Philo of Alexandria (20 BCE – 50 CE), an Hellenistic Jewish philosopher
- Ptolemy of Alexandria, a Greek mathematician, astronomer, geographer, astrologer in 2c AD.
- Saint Macarius of Alexandria (died 395), a monk in the Nitrian Desert.
- Theon of Alexandria (ca. 335 - ca. 405 AD), a Greek scholar and mathematician.
- Theophilus of Alexandria (died 412), Patriarch of Alexandria, Egypt from 385 to 412

== Popes ==
- List of Coptic Orthodox Popes of Alexandria
- Pope Abraham of Alexandria the 62nd Pope of the Coptic Orthodox Church from 975 to 978.
- Pope Alexander of Alexandria (died 17 April 326) was the nineteenth Patriarch of Alexandria from 313 to his death.
- Pope Anianus of Alexandria, the Patriarch of Alexandria from 68 to 82.
- Pope Demetrius of Alexandria Patriarch of Alexandria (189–232).
- Dionysius of Alexandria, the Pope of Alexandria from 248 to 265.
- Pope Dioscorus I of Alexandria was Patriarch of Alexandria from 444.
- Pope Heraclas of Alexandria, the thirteenth Pope of Alexandria between 232 and 248
- Pope Peter of Alexandria (d. 311)
- Pope Theonas of Alexandria, Pope of Alexandria between 282 and 300.
- Timothy I of Alexandria, Pope of Alexandria between 378 and 384

== Others ==
- Battle of Alexandria
  - Siege of Alexandria (47 BC) – fought between Roman forces.
  - Battle of Alexandria (30 BC) – fought between Roman forces .
  - Siege of Alexandria (619) – conducted by the Sassanid Empire against a Byzantine Empire.
  - Siege of Alexandria (641) – conducted by the Rashidun army against the Byzantine capital.
  - Battle of Alexandria (1799) – fought between French and Mamaluk forces.
  - Battle of Alexandria (1801) – fought between British and French forces.
  - Siege of Alexandria (1801) – fought between British and French forces.
  - Raid on Alexandria (1941) – an attack on British shipping by Italian special forces during WWII.
- Bombardment of Alexandria (1882)
- Catechetical School of Alexandria
- Church of Alexandria
- Eastern Orthodox Church of Alexandria
- Library of Alexandria
- Lighthouse of Alexandria
- Muscat of Alexandria, a white wine grape.
- Patriarch of Alexandria
- Pope of the Coptic Orthodox Church of Alexandria
  - List of Coptic Orthodox Popes of Alexandria
- Coptic Orthodox Church of Alexandria
- Greek Orthodox Church of Alexandria
