= Pope Achillas of Alexandria =

Patriarch of Alexandria from 312 to 313

Bishop Achillas the Great
- Patriarch of Alexandria
- Papacy began: 24 December 312
- Papacy ended: June 313
- Predecessor: Peter "Seal of the Martyrs"
- Successor: Alexander

Personal details
- Born: Alexandria, Egypt
- Died: June 313 Egypt
- Buried: Church of the Cave, Alexandria
- Denomination: Church of Alexandria
- Education: Catechetical School of Alexandria

Sainthood
- Feast day: 19 Paoni (Coptic Christianity)
- Venerated in: Oriental Orthodox Churches; Catholic Church; Eastern Orthodoxy

Achillas was the 18th Patriarch of Alexandria, reigning from 312 to 313.

He was born in Alexandria, Egypt, and was renowned for his knowledge and piety; this was why Pope Theonas had ordained him priest and appointed him head of the Catechetical School of Alexandria upon the departure of Pierius. He was apparently very highly thought of for his work in Greek philosophy and theological science, as Pope Athanasius later described him by the honorific "Achillas the Great".

As recommended by Pope Peter, he was enthroned patriarch in December (Kiahk) 312 AD, after the martyrdom of Peter during the Diocletianic Persecution. He yielded to the request of Arius, who had been condemned by Peter, to return to his former position as priest and preacher.

Achillas died six months later on 19 Paoni 313.

After his death, Arius nominated himself to become Bishop of Alexandria, but the clergy and the people chose Alexander instead.

== Sources ==
- "Achillas (311–313)". Official web site of the Greek Orthodox Patriarchate of Alexandria and All Africa. Archived from the original on 2011-08-12.

Titles of the Great Christian Church
Preceded by Peter I	Pope and Patriarch of Alexandria; 312—313	Succeeded by Alexander I
