= Pope Justus of Alexandria =

Head of the Coptic Church from 118 to 129

Saint Justus of Alexandria
- Patriarch of Alexandria
- See: Alexandria
- Papacy began: 118
- Papacy ended: 19 June 129
- Predecessor: Primus
- Successor: Eumenes

Personal details
- Born: Egypt
- Died: 19 June 129 Alexandria, Egypt
- Buried: Baucalis, Alexandria
- Denomination: Church of Alexandria
- Education: Catechetical School of Alexandria

Sainthood
- Feast day: 19 June (12 Paoni in the Coptic calendar)

Pope Justus was the sixth Pope and Patriarch of Alexandria.

Justus was an honorable and learned man before his ordination. He was baptized by Mark the Evangelist, along with his father, his mother and others. St. Mark also appointed him as the first Dean of the Catechetical School of Alexandria. Anianus, the second patriarch, ordained him a deacon, then a priest, and appointed him to preach and teach the people. He was chosen as patriarch to succeed Primus. He shepherded his people with the best of care for ten years. He died on the 12th of Paoni 129 AD, in the sixteenth year of the reign of Hadrian.

Titles of the Great Christian Church
Preceded by Primus	Patriarch of Alexandria; 118–129	Succeeded by Eumenes
