= Pope Primus of Alexandria =

Head of the Coptic Church from 106 to 118

- Pope and Patriarch of Alexandria
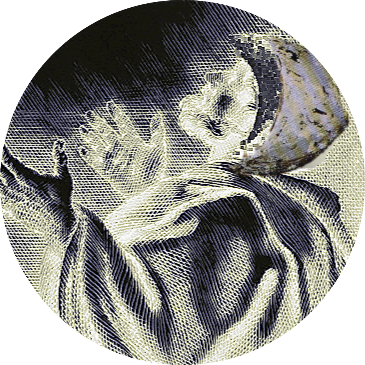
- Papacy began: 16 June 106
- Papacy ended: 9 August 118
- Predecessor: Kedron
- Successor: Justus

Orders
- Ordination: 43 AD. (Priesthood)

Personal details
- Born: Egypt
- Died: 9 August 118 Alexandria, Egypt
- Buried: Baucalis, Alexandria
- Denomination: Church of Alexandria

Pope Primus, also called Aprimos, was the fifth Pope and Patriarch of Alexandria.

He was baptized by Mark the Evangelist. He was one of the three who were ordained priests by Mark, along with Bishop Anianus, the Second Patriarch.

Primus was ascetic, pious, and filled with good deeds. He was appointed patriarch on the 22nd day of Paoni (June 16, 106 A.D.). During his reign, the church was in peace and tranquility. He is commemorated in the Coptic Synaxarion on the 3rd day of Mesra, in the fifth year of the reign of Hadrian.

Titles of the Great Christian Church
Preceded by Kedron	Pope and Patriarch of Alexandria; 106–118	Succeeded by Justus
