= Pope Maximus of Alexandria =

Head of the Coptic Church from 264 to 282

Pope Saint Maximus of Alexandria
- Pope and Patriarch of Alexandria
- Papacy began: 9 November 264
- Papacy ended: 22 April 282
- Predecessor: Dionysius
- Successor: Theonas

Personal details
- Born: Alexandria, Egypt
- Died: April 22, 282 Egypt
- Buried: Church of the Cave, Alexandria
- Denomination: Church of Alexandria

Sainthood
- Venerated in: Coptic Orthodoxy; Catholic Church

Pope Maximus of Alexandria, 15th Pope and Patriarch of Alexandria. He is commemorated in the Coptic Synaxarion on the 14th day of Baramudah (April 22), and by the Romans on Dec. 27.

Titles of the Great Christian Church
Preceded by Dionysius	Pope and Patriarch of Alexandria; 264—282	Succeeded by Theonas
