= Pope Avilius of Alexandria =

Head of the Coptic Church from 83 to 95 AD

Saint Avilius of Alexandria
- Patriarch of Alexandria
- Papacy began: 83 AD
- Papacy ended: 11 September 95 AD
- Predecessor: Anianus
- Successor: Cerdon

Orders
- Ordination: 43 AD (Priesthood)

Personal details
- Born: Egypt
- Died: 11 September 95 AD Alexandria, Egypt
- Buried: Baucalis, Alexandria
- Denomination: Church of Alexandria

Sainthood
- Feast day: 22 February (Eastern Orthodox); 29 March (Roman Catholic); 29 August (Roman Catholic); 1 Thout (Coptic)

Pope Avilius of Alexandria (also known as Abilius, Sabellius, Abylius, Abitius, Milius and Melyos) (? – 95 AD), was the third Patriarch of Alexandria.

== Overview ==
Upon the death of Anianus of Alexandria, the suffragan bishops and priests of the area converged with the laity in Alexandria and unanimously elected Avilius in the month of December (Kiahk), 83 AD, during the reign of the Roman Emperor Domitian.

Pope Avilius was known for his chastity, and was pious and caring towards the people of Christ. He continued to establish the people in faith and the Christians grew in number in Egypt and in the five western provinces, and Sudan. During his time serving, the Egyptian people began renouncing the worshiping of idols and practiced their Christianity together, in groups. Despite the religion of Egypt being Roman Paganism, his time as pope was a time of peace for the church.

While some historians claim that Emperor Domitian expelled Avilius from the episcopal throne, and installed another in his place, there is no written record of this. According to historical records, he remained in his position for twelve years, and died on the first of Thout (11 September), in the year 95. Avilius was buried next to the remains of St. Mark the Evangelist in the Church of Baucalis in Alexandria.

== Veneration ==
He is venerated as a saint in various churches. His feast day in the Coptic Church is on The Coptic New Year 1 Thout, which is September 11 in the Gregorian calendar, and on 29 August and 29 March in the Catholic Church, and February 22 in Eastern Orthodox Church.

Titles of the Great Christian Church
Preceded by Anianus	Patriarch of Alexandria; 83-95	Succeeded by Kedron
