= Pope Agrippinus of Alexandria =

Head of the Coptic Church from 167 to 178

Saint Agrippinus of Alexandria
- Pope and Patriarch of Alexandria
- Papacy began: 167
- Papacy ended: 12 February 178
- Predecessor: Celadion
- Successor: Julian

Personal details
- Born: Alexandria, Egypt
- Died: 12 February 178 Alexandria, Egypt
- Buried: Baucalis, Alexandria
- Denomination: Christian

Sainthood
- Feast day: 12 February (5 Amshir in the Coptic calendar)

Pope Agrippinus was the tenth Pope and Patriarch of Alexandria, serving during the reign of Marcus Aurelius.

When Pope Celadion died, Bishop Agrippinus was chosen Patriarch by the people and clergy of Alexandria in 167. According to Coptic tradition, Agrippinus did not own any silver or gold, except for what met his basic personal needs. Aggrippinus died in 178 after a reign of 12 years. He is commemorated on the 5th day of Meshir in the Coptic Synaxarium.

Titles of the Great Christian Church
Preceded by Celadion	Pope and Patriarch of Alexandria; 167–178	Succeeded by Julian
