= Orthodox Church of Alexandria =

Orthodox Church of Alexandria may refer to:

- Greek Orthodox Church of Alexandria, one of the autoencephalous churches of the Eastern Orthodox Church
- Coptic Orthodox Church, one of the churches that make up Oriental Orthodoxy

== See also ==
- Church of Alexandria
- Patriarch of Alexandria
