= Pope Demetrius I of Alexandria =

Head of the Coptic Church from c. 189 to c. 232

Saint Demetrius of Alexandria
- Pope and Patriarch of Alexandria
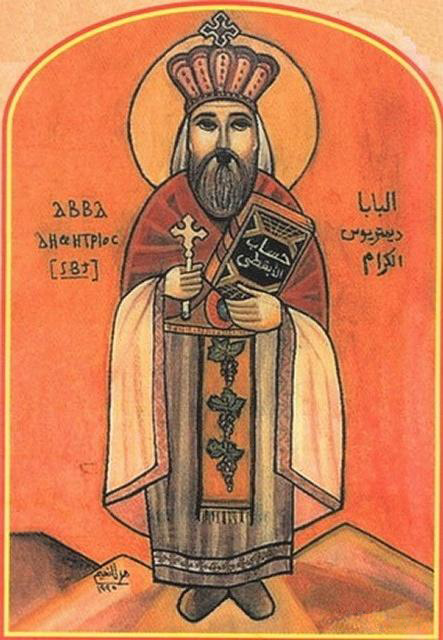
- Bishop Demetrius
- Archdiocese: Alexandria
- See: Alexandria
- Papacy began: early 189
- Papacy ended: 9 October c. 224-232
- Predecessor: St. Julian of Alexandria
- Successor: St. Heraclas of Alexandria

Personal details
- Born: c. 127 AD Alexandria, Egypt
- Died: 9 October c. 224-232 Alexandria, Egypt
- Buried: Baucalis, Alexandria
- Denomination: Church of Alexandria
- Residence: Saint Mark's Church

Sainthood
- Feast day: Coptic Church: 12 Ⲡⲁⲟⲡⲓ (Julian Calendar: 9 October); Catholic Church: 9 October
- Venerated in: Oriental Orthodox Church; Coptic Catholic Church; Roman Catholic Church

Papal styles of Pope Demetrius I
- Reference style: His Holiness
- Spoken style: Your Holiness
- Religious style: Pope and Patriarch
- Posthumous style: Saint

Demetrius I (died 22 October 232), 12th Bishop and Patriarch of Alexandria. Sextus Julius Africanus, who visited Alexandria in the Bishoprice of Demetrius, places his accession as eleventh bishop from Mark in the tenth year of Roman Emperor Commodus; Eusebius of Caesarea places it in the tenth year of Septimius Severus.

== Life ==
Demetrius was a farmer, who cohabited with his wife as celibates, for 47 years, until he was chosen Patriarch. According to the Coptic Synaxarium, a biographical collection of the Church's saints, the ailing Patriarch Julian had a vision informing him that his successor would visit him, with a cluster of grapes, while out of season at that time of year. The next day, a farmer named Demetrius arrived with a cluster of grapes for the Bishop, asking for his blessings, and was announced next as Bishop Demetrius I, the twelfth bishop of Alexandria.

Eusebius wrote a traditional list of bishops of Alexandria from Mark the Evangelist to Demetrius, but this list is apocryphal.

Bishop Demetrius was eager to establish a fixed calendar for church fasts and feast days. He established a liturgical calendar by which fast dates were determined. As bishop of the great metropolis, Demetrius was engaged in the controversy over the canonical calculation of Easter. He was the first to apply the calculation method for determining the dates of Easter. His edict was approved by the Nicene Council (325 AD). The Oriental Orthodox churches continue to follow Alexandria.

Jerome claimed that Demetrius sent Pantaenus on a mission to India, it is likely that Clement succeeded Pantaenus as head of the Catechetical School before the patriarchy of Demetrius. When Clement left Alexandria (c. 203), Demetrius appointed Origen, who was in his eighteenth year, as Clement's successor.

Demetrius supported Origen in the beginning of his career, it is said to have admired his scholarship. He dispatched Origen to Arabia, upon an invitation for his visit in letters to the prefect of Alexandria. When the Emperor Caracalla sacked Alexandria in 215 AD, Origen fled to Caesarea, where the Palestinean bishops requested him to give sermons. Demetrius was enraged and wrote to rebuke that his teaching was not canonical for him, as a layman. Bishops Alexander of Jerusalem and Theoctistus of Caesarea wrote in his defense and mentioned precedents for laymen to give sermons, but despite their efforts Demetrius recalled Origen.

In 230, Origen was asked to settle a dispute in Achaea which required his presence, so he set out by way of Palestine. Origen was then ordained priest at Caesarea. When Demetrius learned of this, he considered it an act of emancipation, which deteriorated their relationship. Demetrius convened a synod in 232 that banished Origen, then sent a condemnation of Origen's behavior to all the churches. It is evident, it was personal jealousy not merely non ordination, that have been alleged by Demetrius for such a reaction. Rome accepted the decision, but Caesarea, Phoenicia, Arabia, Achaea disputed it. From Caesarea Origen sent forth letters in his self defence, and attacked Demetrius.

Demetrius then passed Catechetical School under the charge of Heraclas, an assistant of Origen, who had long been his associate. This may have been Demetrius' final act as bishop. Demetrius governed the Church of Alexandria for forty-two years, and died at the age of 105. Demetrius is regarded as the second founder of the church of Alexandria and founder of the church in Egypt due to his work on the hierarchy of the church in the area.

== Works cited ==
- Mitchell, Margaret; Young, Frances, eds. (2006). The Cambridge History of Christianity: Origins to Constantine. Vol. 1. Cambridge University Press. ISBN 9780521812399.

Titles of the Great Christian Church
Preceded by Julian	Pope and Patriarch of Alexandria; 189–232	Succeeded by Heraclas
