= Pope Kedron of Alexandria =

Head of the Coptic Church from 96 to 106 AD

Saint Kedronos of Alexandria
- Patriarch of Alexandria
- Archdiocese: Alexandria
- See: Alexandria
- Papacy began: 5 September 96
- Papacy ended: 28 June 106
- Predecessor: Avilius
- Successor: Primus

Orders
- Ordination: 43 AD. (Priesthood)

Personal details
- Born: Egypt
- Died: 28 June 106 Alexandria, Egypt
- Buried: Baucalis, Alexandria
- Denomination: Church of Alexandria

Sainthood
- Feast day: 28 June (21 Paoni in the Coptic calendar)

Kedron of Alexandria, also called Kedronos, was the fourth Patriarch of Alexandria.

When the priest and Bishops who served in the country learned that the Bishop Avilius, Patriarch of Alexandria had died, they gathered in Alexandria to consult with the Christian people there, and elected Kedronos as successor. It was said that he was among those who had been baptized by Saint Mark, and he was enthroned Patriarch in Babab (October), in 96 AD, during the reign of the Emperor Nerva.

Kedron was arrested and martyred in the persecution under the Emperor Trajan. It was said that the reason for the arrest was that one of the Roman governors had said to him, "Why do you not have our gods partake with your God and continue to worship him?" So he answered, "Because we do not prostrate before any other." His martyrdom took place on the 21st of Paoni (28 June), in 106 AD.

Kedron was known as chaste and virtuous. He led the Church for eleven years, one month, and twelve days.

Titles of the Great Christian Church
Preceded by Avilius	Patriarch of Alexandria; 95–106	Succeeded by Primus
