= Pope Markianos of Alexandria =

Head of the Coptic Church from 141 to 152

Saint Markianos of Alexandria
- Patriarch of Alexandria
- Papacy began: 141
- Papacy ended: 1 January 152
- Predecessor: Eumenes
- Successor: Celadion

Personal details
- Born: Alexandria, Egypt
- Died: 1 January 152 Alexandria, Egypt
- Buried: Baucalis, Alexandria
- Denomination: Coptic Orthodox Christian
- Education: Catechetical School of Alexandria

Sainthood
- Feast day: 6 Tobi

Pope Markianos was the eighth Pope and Patriarch of Alexandria, reigning from 141 to 152.

Markianos was born in Alexandria, Egypt and he was the Dean of The Catechetical School of Alexandria, before being appointed Patriarch in the month of Hathor in the year 141 AD during the reign of the Emperor Antoninus Pius.

He died on the 6th of Tobi, in the year 152 AD.

Titles of the Great Christian Church
Preceded by Eumenes	Patriarch of Alexandria; 141–152	Succeeded by Celadion
