= Pope Celadion of Alexandria =

Head of the Coptic Church from 152 to 166

Saint Celadion of Alexandria
- Pope and Patriarch of Alexandria
- Papacy began: 16 January 152
- Papacy ended: 16 July 166
- Predecessor: Markianos
- Successor: Agrippinus

Personal details
- Born: Alexandria, Egypt
- Died: 16 July 166 Alexandria, Egypt
- Buried: Baucalis, Alexandria
- Denomination: Coptic Orthodox Christian

Sainthood
- Feast day: 16 July (9 Epip in the Coptic calendar)

Pope Celadion (Keladionus) was the ninth Pope and Patriarch of Alexandria. He reigned from the year 152 to 166 AD.

Celadion was born in Alexandria, Egypt. He was elected Patriarch in the year 152 AD during the reign of Antoninus Pius.

He reigned for fourteen years, six months, and three days, and died during the reign of Marcus Aurelius and Lucius Verus, on the 9th of Epip (16 July), in the year 166 AD.

Titles of the Great Christian Church
Preceded by Markianos	Pope and Patriarch of Alexandria; 152–166	Succeeded by Agrippinus
