= Pope Peter I =

Pope Peter I may refer to:

- Pope Peter, papal name sometimes referring to the Apostle Peter (c. 1 BC–AD 67)
- Pope Peter I of Alexandria (ruled in 300–311)
