= Pope Eumenes of Alexandria =

Head of the Coptic Church from 129 to 141

Saint Eumenes of Alexandria
- Patriarch of Alexandria
- Papacy began: 129
- Papacy ended: 19 October 141
- Predecessor: Justus
- Successor: Markianos

Personal details
- Born: Egypt
- Died: 19 October 141 Alexandria, Egypt
- Buried: Baucalis, Alexandria
- Denomination: Coptic Orthodox Christian
- Education: Catechetical School of Alexandria

Sainthood
- Feast day: 19 October (9 Babah in the Coptic calendar)

Pope Eumenes was the seventh Pope and Patriarch of Alexandria, reigning from 129 to 141.

Eumenes was one of the most respected Christians in Alexandria, Egypt. He was chosen in July (Abib) in 129 during the reign of Emperor Hadrian. He also took over from Pope Justus as the second Dean of the Catechetical School of Alexandria.

During his time he ordained several Bishops, and he sent them to preach in all the provinces of Egypt, Nubia and to Pentapolis and to spread the good news of the Salvation.

The persecution of the Christians increased during his time and many were martyred. After reigning for thirteen years, he died on the 9th of Babah (19 October) in 141 AD.

Titles of the Great Christian Church
Preceded by Justus	Patriarch of Alexandria; 129–141	Succeeded by Markianos
