= List of patriarchs of Alexandria =

The Patriarch of Alexandria (also known as the Bishop of Alexandria or Pope of Alexandria) is the highest-ranking bishop of Egypt. The Patriarchs trace back their lineage to Mark the Evangelist.

Following the Council of Chalcedon in 451, a schism occurred in Egypt, between those who accepted and those who rejected the decisions of the council. The former are known as Chalcedonians and the latter are known as miaphysites. Over the next several decades, these two parties competed on the See of Alexandria and frequently still recognized the same Patriarch. But after 536, they permanently established separate patriarchates, and have maintained separate lineages of Patriarchs. The miaphysites became the Coptic Church (part of Oriental Orthodoxy) and the Chalcedonians became the Greek Orthodox Church of Alexandria (part of the wider Eastern Orthodox Church).

Therefore, this list only contains those Patriarchs who served up until 536. For later Popes and Patriarchs, follow the links at the bottom of the following section.

== List of patriarchs (prior to 536) ==
1. Mark the Evangelist (43–68)
2. Anianus (68–85)
3. Avilius (85–98)
4. Kedron (98–109)
5. Primus (109–121)
6. Justus (121–131)
7. Eumenes (131–141)
8. Markianos (142–152)
9. Celadion (152–166)
10. Agrippinus (167–178)
11. Julian (178–189)
12. Demetrius I (189–232)
13. Heraclas (232–248)
14. Dionysius (248–264)
15. Maximus (265–282)
16. Theonas (282–300)
17. Peter I (300–311)
18. Achillas (312–313)
19. Alexander I (313–326), First Ecumenical Council occurred
20. Athanasius I (328–373) Served as a Deacon for the First Council; later became Pope of Alexandria
21. Pistos (336 or 338), an Arian appointee.
22. Gregory of Cappadocia (339–346), an Arian appointee.
23. Georgius (357-361), an Arian appointee.
24. Lucius of Alexandria (365, 375-378), an Arian appointee.
25. Peter II (373–380)
26. Timothy I (380–385), Second Ecumenical Council occurred
27. Theophilus I (385–412)
28. Cyril I (412–444), Third Ecumenical Council occurred.
29. Dioscorus I (444–451), Second Council of Ephesus occurred. Pope Dioscorus was later deposed by the Council of Chalcedon but still recognized by Miaphysites until his death in 454. Non-Chalcedonian
30. Proterius (451–457) Deposed by Coptic (Alexandrian) Synod under Timothy II Aelurus, Chalcedonian
31. Timothy II Aelurus (457–460), Non-Chalcedonian
32. Timothy III Salophakiolos (460–475), Chalcedonian but not recognized by Miaphysites who continued to recognise Timothy II Aelurus
33. Timothy II Aelurus (restored) (475–477), presided the Third Council of Ephesus, that condemned Chalcedon and Eutychian Monophysitism in favor of "Miaphysite" Monophysitism (without mentioning Eutyches by Name) Non-Chalcedonian
34. Peter III Mongus (477), Non-Chalcedonian chosen by the Miaphysite faction after the death of Timothy II, quickly deposed by imperial authority.
35. Timothy III Salophakiolos (restored) (477–481), Chalcedonian
  Peter III Mongus(477–489), Non-Chalcedonian
36. John I Talaia, (481–482), Chalcedonian but not recognized by Miaphysites who continued to recognise Peter III Mongus Deposed by Zeno for his refusal to sign the Henoticon
  Peter III Mongus (477–489), Non-Chalcedonian
37. Peter III Mongus (restored) (482–489), Non-Chalcedonian

Restored by Zeno, signed the Henoticon, rejected by the monophysite Acephali faction for it

1. Athanasius II Kelites (489–496), Non-Chalcedonian
2. John II (I) (496–505), Non-Chalcedonian
3. John III (II) (505–516), Non-Chalcedonian
4. Dioscorus II (516–517), Non-Chalcedonian
5. Timothy III (517–535), Non-Chalcedonian
6. Theodosius I (535–536), Non-Chalcedonian.

After 536, the Chalcedonians and Non-Chalcedonians (Miaphysites) recognised different patriarchs.

For the later succession of Miaphysite (Coptic) patriarchs and Greek (Chalcedonian) patriarchs, see:

- List of popes of the Coptic Orthodox Church.
- List of Greek Orthodox patriarchs of Alexandria.

== See also ==
- Patriarch of Alexandria

== Bibliography ==
- Eder, Walter; Renger, Johannes, eds. (2007). Chronologies of the Ancient World: Names, Dates and Dynasties. Brill.
