= Pope Alexander I of Alexandria =

Head of the Coptic Church from 312 to 328

Saint Alexander of Alexandria
- Patriarch of Alexandria
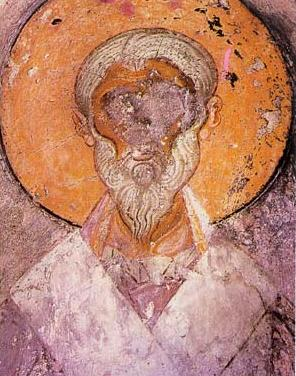
- Church: Great Church
- Archdiocese: Alexandria
- See: Alexandria
- Predecessor: Achillas
- Successor: Athanasius I

Personal details
- Died: 26 February or 17 April 326 or 328 Alexandria

Sainthood
- Feast day: 26 February, April 17 (Catholic Church); 29 May (Eastern Orthodox)
- Venerated in: Catholic Church; Oriental Orthodox Church; Eastern Orthodox Church
- Title as Saint: Pope of Alexandria & Patriarch of the See of St. Mark

Alexander I of Alexandria (Koine Greek: Ἀλέξανδρος, Aléxandros) was the 19th Patriarch of Alexandria.

During his patriarchate, he dealt with a number of issues facing the Church in that day. These included the dating of Easter, the actions of Meletius of Lycopolis, and the issue of greatest substance, Arianism. He was the leader of the opposition to Arianism at the First Council of Nicaea. He also mentored his successor, Athanasius of Alexandria, who would become an important Church Father and advocate of the Nicene position against the Arians. He is venerated as a saint in the Catholic and Orthodox Churches.

== Biography ==
Comparatively little is known about Alexander's early years. During his time as a priest, he experienced the bloody persecutions of Christians by Emperors Galerius and Maximinus Daia.

Alexander became patriarch on the passing of Achillas of Alexandria, whose own remarkably short reign was thought by some to have been brought about by his breaking the command of his own predecessor, Peter of Alexandria, to never readmit Arius into communion.

Alexander himself faced three primary challenges during his patriarch term. The first of these was a schismatic sect, led by Erescentius, which disputed the timing of Easter. Alexander found himself put in the position of writing a special treatise on the controversy, in which he cited earlier statements regarding the matter by Dionysius of Alexandria. Alexander's own efforts, while they did serve to quiet the dispute, were not enough to quiet the controversy themselves, although the First Council of Nicaea, held during his tenure, did resolve the matter.

=== Meletius of Lycopolis ===
His second major concern was the matter of Meletius of Lycopolis, who continued to slander Alexander, as he had earlier done to Achillas. Meletius went so far as to lodge a formal complaint with the court of the Emperor Constantine I, although no unusual attention was given it.

More important, however, was that Meletius had seemed to establish some form of working alliance with Arius. Meletius also consecrated bishops of his own, without his superior's consent. This controversy would continue unabated until the Council at Nicaea, where Alexander allowed Meletius to return to the church, effectively ending Meletius' alliance with Arius.

=== Arianism ===
The last, and most important, of the problems Alexander faced was the issue of Arius himself. Alexander's predecessor, Achillas, had not only allowed Arius to return to the church, but had given him the oldest church in Alexandria, a position which allowed him to exercise a great influence on the Christian community of Alexandria. In fact, Arius was even a contender for the post of patriarch of Alexandria at the death of Achillas.

The conflict between the two began in earnest when Alexander declared the unity of the Trinity in one of his sermons. Arius immediately responded by labeling Alexander's statement Sabellianism, which had already been rejected by that time. The controversy quickly escalated, and Arius developed ever increasing support for his position, winning over a number of deacons, and at least one presbyter, who started to ordain presbyters of his own. Arius continued to draw even more attention and support, to the point that Alexander found himself having to summon two separate assemblies of his priests and deacons to discuss the matter. Neither of these assemblies, though, reached any firm conclusions, or helped to limit the spread of Arius' beliefs.

Alexander then called a synod of the church of Alexandria and its neighboring province of Mareotis in 320, for the specific intention of deciding what action would be taken regarding this increasingly problematic matter. At the synod, thirty-six presbyters and forty-four deacons, including Athanasius of Alexandria, agreed to a condemnation of Arianism and signed a document to that effect. Arius remained successful in spreading his new belief elsewhere, particularly in Mareotis and Libya, where Arius convinced the bishop Secundus of Ptolemais and Thomas of Marmarica to join him. Arius' success in dividing the leaders of the church made the chance of a formal schism a very real one.

In 321, Alexander called a general council of the entire church of the nation. The council gathered no fewer than one hundred participants. At this council, Arius continued to argue his earlier position, that the Son could not be co-eternal with the father, and even went on to say that the Son was not similar to the Father in substance. This last statement was received with horror by the assembled council, who placed Arius under anathema until he recanted his positions.

Arius left for Palestine, where he received support from a number of bishops, who expressed their opinion of the matter to Alexander. One of these supporters, Eusebius of Nicomedia, had close connections with the imperial court in Byzantium, and helped to spread Arius' ideas further. The widespread growth of this movement, and the reaction to such from the established church, led to the emperor himself writing a letter to the involved parties calling for the return of unity to the church and an end to this protracted dispute about what he characterized as petty arguments over unintelligible minutiae.

Arius' followers in Alexandria began to engage in violence in defense of their beliefs, prompting Alexander to write an encyclical to all of his brother bishops in Christendom, in which he related the history of Arianism and his opinion of the flaws of the Arian system. In doing so, he was obliged to indicate to them the actions of Eusebius of Nicomedia, who had assembled a provincial council of the church of Bithynia to discuss Arius. This body reviewed the actions that Alexander and his predecessors had taken, and, based on their review, formally admitted Arius to the communion of the Syriac church. Other figures, including Paulinus of Tyrus, Eusebius of Caesarea, and Patrophilus of Scythopolis, also indicated their support of Arius, allowing his followers to assemble for the Divine Office as they had earlier done in Alexandria.

Arius is believed to have written his Thalia at around this time, which gathered even more support for his cause. This book, combined with Arius' other works and Alexander's opposing works, exacerbated the dispute between the supporters and opponents of Arius. In this atmosphere and on the advice of his deacon Athanasius, Alexander wrote in defense of his own position a confession of faith. He sent this tome to all the bishops of Christianity, asking them to endorse his position by placing their own signatures on the copies. He received about 250 signatures to his work, including about 100 from his own diocese, as well as 42 from Asia, 37 from Pamphylia, 32 from Lycia, 15 from Cappadocia, and various others. He also maintained individual correspondence with Alexander of Constantinople, protesting the violence of the Arians and promulgation of Arius's views on the influence of females, as well as with Pope Sylvester I, Macarius of Jerusalem, Asclepius of Gaza, Longinus of Ashkelon, Macarius of Ioannina, Zeno of Tyrus, and many others on the issues of Arianism.

The dispute over Arianism had become a serious problem, which threatened to damage the peace and unity of the church and of the empire. Constantine, now sole claimant to the throne after the execution of Licinius, wrote a letter "to Athanasius and Arius". Constantine wrote the letter from Nicomedia, so some have concluded that Eusebius of Nicomedia, the bishop of Nicomedia and a supporter of Arius, may have been involved in the composition of the letter. The letter was given to Hosius of Córdoba, a respected older bishop, to deliver to the disputants in Alexandria. In the letter, Constantine requested that Alexander and Arius end their dispute.

Shortly after receiving the message from Constantine, Alexander requested another general council of the diocese, which seems to have confirmed its agreement with the profession of faith Alexander had earlier circulated an agreement to the use of the theological term "consubstantial". It also reaffirmed the excommunication of Arius and the condemnation of the followers of Meletius, which, of course, angered the Arians of Alexandria even more. Arius himself formally complained to the emperor over his treatment by Alexander. In response, Constantine called for Arius to plead his case before an ecumenical council of the church, to be held at Nicaea in Bithynia on 14 June 325, the first such council ever called into existence.

=== First Council of Nicaea ===
Alexander came to the council with a party which included Potamon of Heraclea, Paphnutius of Thebes, and Alexander's deacon, Athanasius, who acted as his spokesman. Alexander was himself supposed to preside over the meeting, but felt that he could not serve as both presiding official and chief accuser. On that basis, he turned over the presidency to Hosius of Cordova. After lengthy discussion, the council issued a decision which, among other things, confirmed the anathema of Arius, authorized Alexander, at his urging, to allow Meletius to retain his episcopal title, but not be able to exercise any episcopal powers. Those Meletius had appointed could also retain their titles, but would only be elevated to the status of bishop on the death of one of the bishops consecrated by Alexander. It also gave Alexander the right to decide the timing of Easter on his own, asking him only to communicate his decision to Rome and the rest of Christendom. It also issued a statement that the Egyptian church would be allowed to retain its traditions regarding clerical celibacy. In this regard, Alexander followed the advice of Paphnutius of Thebes, who encouraged him to allow priests to be married after taking holy orders.

Five months after returning to Alexandria from Nicaea, Alexander died. One source places his death on the 22nd of Baramudah, or April 17. As he was dying, he is said by some to have named Athanasius, his deacon, as his successor.

== Writings ==
Several works attributed to Alexander have not survived. History mentions a collection of letters he wrote regarding the Arian controversy. Only two of these letters survive to this day. There is also an extant homily, De anima et corpore (On the soul and the body) which is attributed to Alexander in a Syriac version. The Coptic version however attributes the homily to Athanasius.

Another work, the Enconium of Peter the Alexandrian, is attributed to him. This book survives in five codices. The work can be reconstructed based on the extant fragments and a translation in the History of the Patriarchs. It contains the biblical allusions, traditions, and portrayal of the martyrdom of Peter. It has been said to be one of the best examples of the literary style of the time, based on its complex literary structure, the competency of its theology, and general literary style.

== Veneration ==
Alexander is venerated as a saint in the Coptic Orthodox Church of Alexandria, the Eastern Orthodox Church, and the Catholic Church.

== See also ==
- Pope Saint Alexander I of Alexandria, patron saint archive

== Notes ==
Titles of the Great Christian Church
Preceded by Achillas	Pope and Patriarch of Alexandria; 313–326 or 328	Succeeded by Athanasius
