= Pope Julian of Alexandria =

Head of the Coptic Church from 178 to 188

Saint Julian of Alexandria
- Pope and Patriarch of Alexandria
- Papacy began: 18 March 178
- Papacy ended: 17 March 188
- Predecessor: Agrippinus
- Successor: Demetrius

Personal details
- Born: Egypt
- Died: 17 March 188 Alexandria, Egypt
- Buried: Baucalis, Alexandria
- Denomination: Coptic Orthodox Christian
- Residence: Saint Mark's Church

Sainthood
- Feast day: 17 March (8 Paremhat in the Coptic calendar)

Pope Julian (Yulianus) of Alexandria (? - 17 March 188 AD) was the 11th Pope and Patriarch of Alexandria.

He had advanced studies in the Bible. Considered a good leader, Julian was enthroned as Patriarch on the 9th Paremhat or the 17th of March in 178 AD. A synod of bishops, together with the laity, in the city of Alexandria, Egypt, appointed him patriarch. He composed homilies and sermons on the saints. He resided in the Cathedral of Saint Mark, the historical seat for the Patriarch of Alexandria.

After a reign of ten years, Julian died on the 8th of Paremhat, or on the 12th of Babah. He is commemorated in the Coptic Synaxarion on the 8th day of Paremhat.

Titles of the Great Christian Church
Preceded by Agrippinus	Pope and Patriarch of Alexandria; 178–188	Succeeded by Demetrius I
