= School of Alexandria =

Christian seminary, 2nd-4th centuries

The Catechetical School of Alexandria was a school of Christian theologians and bishops and deacons in Alexandria. The teachers and students of the school (also known as the Didascalium) were influential in many of the early theological controversies of the Christian church. It was one of the two major centers of the study of biblical exegesis and theology during late antiquity, the other being the School of Antioch.

According to Jerome the Alexandrian school was founded by John Mark the Apostle. The earliest recorded dean was supposedly Athenagoras (176) who was then succeeded by Pantaenus (181); however, Eusebius argues that the school was led by Pantaenus and then Athenagoras. The third head of the school was former student Clement of Alexandria in 190.

Other notable theologians with a connection to the school include Origen, Gregory Thaumaturgus, Heraclas, Dionysius "the Great", and Didymus the Blind. Others, including Jerome and Basil, made trips to the school to interact with the scholars there. Continuity with the ancient school is claimed by the Coptic Theological Seminary, Cairo.

== Beginning ==
The Catechetical School of Alexandria is the oldest catechetical school in the world. Jerome records that the Christian School of Alexandria was founded by St. Mark himself and the first manager appointed by Saint Mark was Saint Justus, who later became the sixth bishop of Alexandria. There is another opinion that the school was founded mid-second century, around 190 AD.

Under the leadership of the scholar Pantaenus, the school of Alexandria became an important institution of religious learning, where students were taught by scholars such as Athenagoras, Clement, Didymus, and the great Origen, who was considered the father of theology and who was also active in the field of commentary and comparative Biblical studies. Many scholars, such as Jerome, visited the school of Alexandria to exchange ideas and to communicate directly with its scholars.

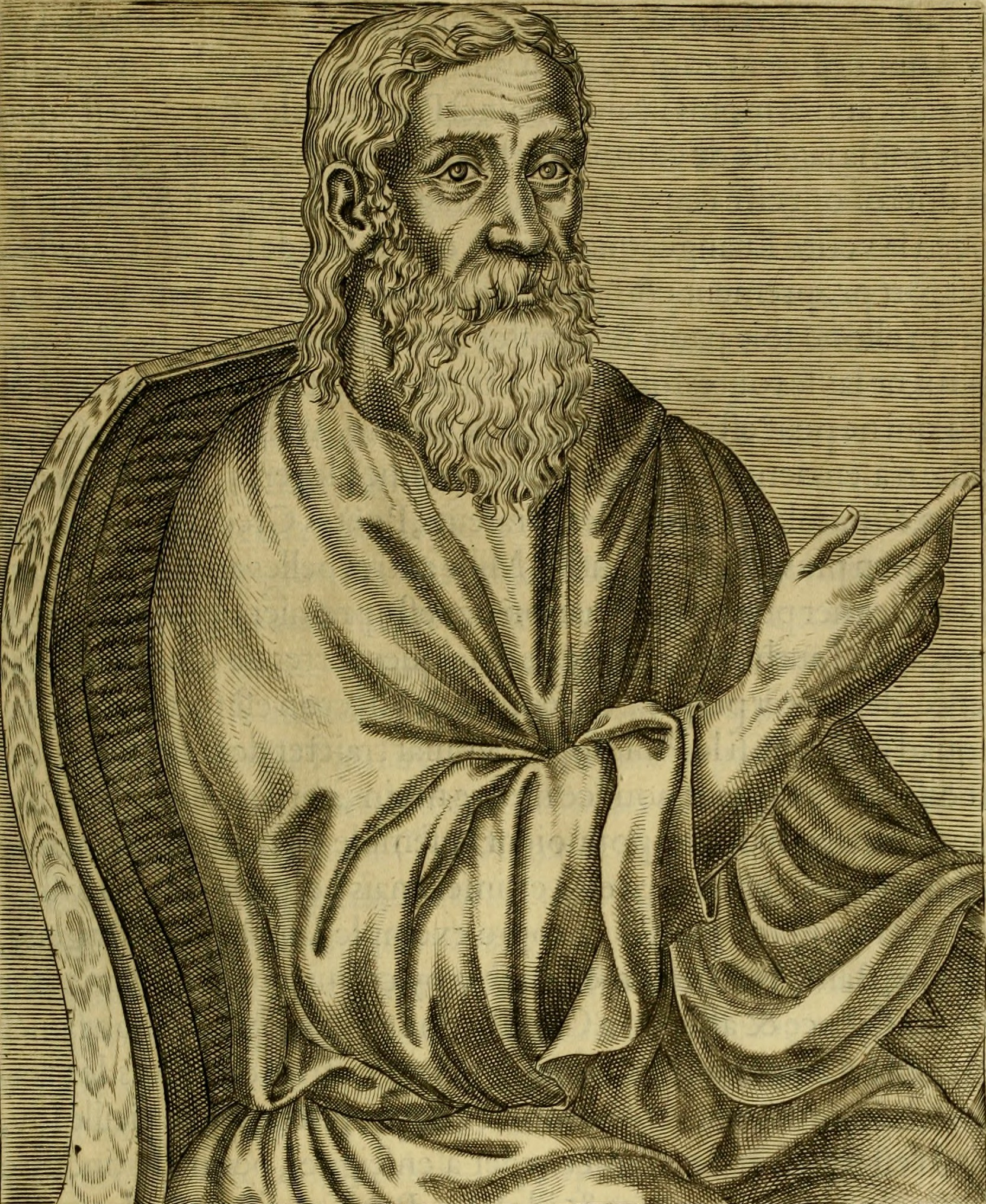
Clement of Alexandria (c. 150–211/216)

The scope of this school was not limited to theological subjects. Apart from subjects like theology, Christian philosophy and the Bible; science, mathematics and Greek and Roman literature, logic and the arts were also taught. The question-and-answer method of commentary began there, and, 15 centuries before Braille, blind students at the school were using wood-carving techniques to read and write.

== Alexandria before the Catechetical School ==
"For about two centuries before the birth of Christ, and the same period after it, Alexandria was the great seat of intellectual culture and home of Greek philosophy. It was the joining point between three continents, and became the battle-ground, where the religions of the East were brought face to face with the philosophical creeds of the West, and where both were represented by their ablest champions."

"The story of Alexandria begins with Alexander the Great. Having conquered Egypt, he tasked Ptolemy Lagus to building Alexandria. The streets were based on Aristotle's ideal urban plan; they were designed on a rectangular grid and oriented south-west to provide shelter from the north wind and take advantage of the westerly breeze. Next to the Serapeum stood the Daughter Library. It was open to the public and according to the poet Callimachus contained 42,800 books. At the heart of the classical city lay the Museion, the first public research institution, and the Great Library, said to contain 700,000 scrolls. The Museum and the Library were not open to the public but reserved for scholars who undertook research in philology, the mathematical sciences and astrology. Both institutions were famed for their accomplishments. The school of mathematics had been founded by Euclid in the fourth century BC. The first director of the Library, Eratosthenes, was the first person to calculate the circumference of the earth, coming within two per cent of modern measurements."

== The Catechetical School ==
"The School's purpose was to supply defenders of the Christian Faith. It did not attain a world-wide fame till Pantaenus became its teacher. He was a native of Sicily, and, before his conversion to Christianity, a Stoic philosopher. It is said that he was converted by one of the disciples of St Mark. He became head of the Catechetical School about 180. He immediately set about introducing those changes that contributed largely to its future celebrity. The union which he effected between theology and philosophy. Clement, the successor of Pantaenus viewed the union with suspicion."

The supporters of Pantaenus "looked on this philosophy as a 'Gift of God', a 'Work of Divine Providence,' which was intended to be for the Gentiles what the Law has been for the Jew, viz,. the means of their justification and a preparation for the Gospel. They held, that between revealed religion and philosophy, thus understood and explained, there can be no antagonism; but that, on the contrary, the latter can be made subservient to the interests of the former in various ways: (a) by training the mind to think and reason accurately, and thus prepare the mind for the higher study of theology. (b) by supplying proofs and illustrations of many truths common to the two sciences. (c) by unfolding and throwing into scientific shape the truths of Revelation.

This union was opposed by the 'Positive Teachers' of the Western Church, especially by Tertullian and St Cyprian.

Pantaenus' successor was Titus Flavius Clement, Clement of Alexandria. Clement was appointed in 192. His lectures were attended by large numbers of pagans. He commenced with those truths that could be demonstrated from philosophy, for the purpose of leading his hearers by degrees to embrace the Christian faith. He did not confine himself to oral instruction. He wrote numerous works for the benefit of those who could not attend his lectures.

In 202 he fled to Palestine because of the persecution of Septimius Severus. After four years he returned".

"The first great figures of the Church in Egypt were scholars rather than bishops, directors of the Catechetical School of Alexandria: Clement (160–215) and Origen (185–251). Both were versed in Greek philosophy and their lives' work was one of great integration: they transformed Christianity from a localised cult for the poorest class into a fully-fledged religion with a philosophy and a cosmology."

== Closure and modern activity ==
"The Council of Constantinople, convened in 381", a little while after the death of St. Athanasius of Alexandria, "had far-reaching effects for Egypt". After declaring the primacy of the Bishop of Rome at the expense of Alexandrian authority, riots destroyed the school. It was reopened in a different location in 1893, now known as the Coptic Theological Seminary.

== Origen's work ==
"Origen undertook this great work to vindicate the Septuagint version of the Bible. The original manuscript was preserved in Caesarea, where it was said to have been destroyed by the Arabs when the city was taken by them in 653. It was Origen, who is generally looked on as the father of biblical criticism, that gave the Catechetical School of Alexandria the high character it enjoyed for biblical studies. He was the first to draw a clear distinction between the different senses which Sacred Scripture can have, viz., the literal, the moral, and the mystical or allegorical."

== Chronological list of deans ==
1. Justus, (62–118)
2. Eumenius, (118–129)
3. Markianos, (129–152)
4. Pantaenus, (181–190)
5. Clement of Alexandria, (190–202)
6. Origen, (203-?)
7. Heraclas, (?–231)
8. Dionysius, (231–247)
9. Theognostus, (3rd century)
10. Pierius, (4th century)
11. Achillas, (4th century)
12. Peter, (4th century)
13. Serapion, (4th century)
14. Macaruis, (4th century)
15. Didymus the Blind, (340–391)
16. Rodon, (5th century)
17. Abbot of the Monastery of Saint Macarius the Great (5th century – 19th century)
18. Youssef Marcarius, (1893–1918)
19. Habib Girgis, (1918–1951)
20. Fr. Ibrahim Attia, (1951–1962)
21. Shenouda III, (1962–1987)
22. Bishop Gregory, (1987–present)

== Notable alumni ==
- Eumenes, 7th Pope of Alexandria
- Markianos, 8th Pope of Alexandria
- Julian, 11th Pope of Alexandria
- Athenagoras of Athens
- Pantaenus
- Clement of Alexandria
- Heraclas, 13th Pope of Alexandria
- Alexander, bishop of Jerusalem
- Origen
- Dionysius, 14th Pope of Alexandria
- Peter,17th Pope of Alexandria
- Achillas, 18th Pope of Alexandria
- Alexander, 19th Pope of Alexandria
- Athanasius, 20th Pope of Alexandria
- Timothy, 22nd Pope of Alexandria
- Cyril, 24th Pope of Alexandria
- Dioscorus, 25th Pope of Alexandria
- Gregory the Theologian, Patriarch of Constantinople
- Didymus the Blind
- Habib Girgis
- Shenouda III, 117th Pope of Alexandria

== See also ==
- Christian Universalism
- Coptic Orthodox Church
- List of prominent Copts
- Middle Platonism
- Catechetical School of Antioch – A school that was seen in opposition to it in early Christological debates
