= Pope Heraclas of Alexandria =

Head of the Coptic Church from 232 to 248

Saint Heraclas of Alexandria
- Pope and Patriarch of Alexandria
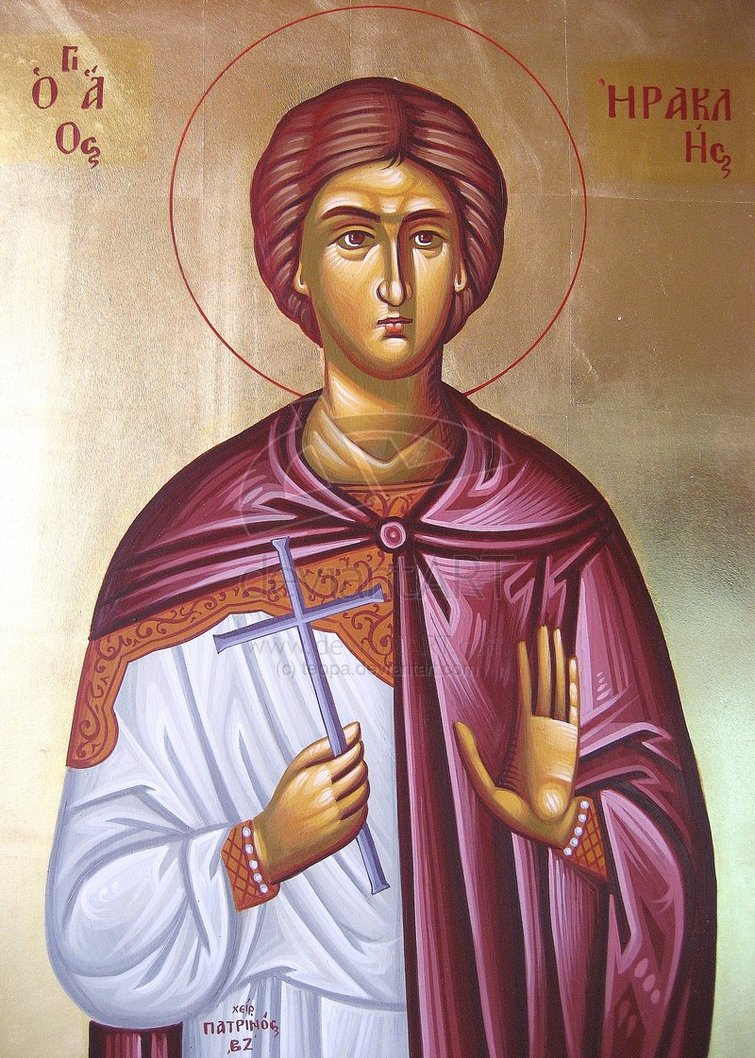
- Saint Heraclas (Theoclas)
- Papacy began: 232
- Papacy ended: 17 December 248
- Predecessor: Demetrius
- Successor: Dionysius

Personal details
- Born: Roman Egypt
- Died: December 17, 248 Roman Egypt
- Buried: Church of the Cave, Alexandria
- Denomination: Church of Alexandria

Sainthood
- Feast day: 17 December (8 Koiak in the Coptic calendar)

Pope Heraclas (Ancient Greek: Ἡρακλῆς) was the 13th Pope and Patriarch of Alexandria, reigning 232–248.

Pope Heraclas of Alexandria was born to pagan parents that were baptized as Christians after his birth. They taught him the Greek philosophy, then Christian doctrine. He also studied the four gospels and the epistles. Demetrius, 12th Patriarch of Alexandria, ordained him deacon, then a priest over the church of Alexandria. He was successful in the ministry, and was faithful in all that was entrusted to him. He followed Origen as head of the Catechetical School of Alexandria.

When Demetrius died, Heraclas was chosen as Patriarch. He converted many pagans and baptized them. He devoted his efforts to teaching, preaching and instructing. He assigned to St. Dionysius the work of judging between the believers, and taking care of their affairs. Pope Heraclas sat on the throne of St. Mark for 16 years until his death.

He was the first Patriarch of Alexandria to be referred to as "Pope" (in Greek, Papás), a term, originally a form of address meaning 'Father', that was used by several bishops. The first known record of this designation being assigned to Heraclas is, per Eusebius in his Eccelesiastical History (Book 7, Chapter 7.1 & 7.4), in a letter written by his successor, Dionysius the Great (248-264), the Patriarch of Alexandria, Dionysius, to Philemon:

τοῦτον ἐγὼ τὸν κανόνα καὶ τὸν τύπον παρὰ τοῦ μακαρίου πάπα ἡμῶν Ἡρακλᾶ παρέλαβον.
[I received this rule and ordinance from our blessed Pope, Heraclas.]

Titles of the Great Christian Church
Preceded by Demetrius I	Pope and Patriarch of Alexandria; 232—248	Succeeded by Dionysius
