= Dionysius of Alexandria =

Head of the Church in Alexandria from 248 to 264

Saint Dionysius the Great
- Pope and Patriarch of Alexandria
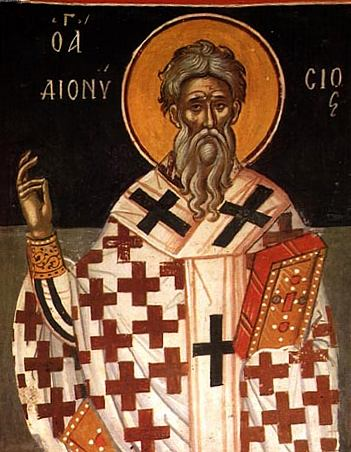
- Pope Dionysius the Great
- Archdiocese: Alexandria
- See: Alexandria
- Papacy began: 28 December 248
- Papacy ended: 22 March 264
- Predecessor: Heraclas
- Successor: Maximus

Personal details
- Born: C. 190 CE Alexandria, Roman Egypt
- Died: 22 March 264 Egypt
- Buried: Church of the Cave, Alexandria
- Education: Catechetical School of Alexandria

Sainthood
- Feast day: 13 Paremhat (Coptic Christianity); 8 April
- Venerated in: Catholicism; Eastern Orthodoxy; Oriental Orthodoxy

Dionysius the Great (Ancient Greek: Διονύσιος Ἀλεξανδρείας) was the 14th Pope and Patriarch of Alexandria from 28 December 248 until his death on 22 March 264. Most information known about him comes from a large corpus of correspondence. Only one complete letter survives; the remaining letters are excerpted in the works of Eusebius.

Called "the Great" by Eusebius, Basil of Caesarea and others, he was characterized by the Catholic Encyclopedia as "undoubtedly, after St. Cyprian, the most eminent bishop of the third century... like St. Cyprian, less a great theologian than a great administrator."

== Early life ==
Dionysius was born to a wealthy polytheistic family around 190. He spent much time reading books and carefully studying the traditions of polytheists. He converted to Christianity at a relatively young age. Dionysius converted to Christianity when he had a vision from God, in which he was commanded to study and refute the heresies facing the early Christians. After his conversion, he joined the Catechetical School of Alexandria and was a student of Origen and Pope Heraclas. He eventually became leader of the school and presbyter of the church, succeeding Pope Heraclas in 231. In 248, Dionysius succeeded Pope Heraclas, becoming Pope of the church of Alexandria and Patriarch of the See of St. Mark.

== Life as Pope of Alexandria ==
Dionysius was a more able administrator than theologian. Information on his work as Bishop of Alexandria is found in Dionysius' correspondence with other bishops and clergymen of the third century Catholic Church. Dionysius’ correspondences included interpretations on the Gospel of Luke, the Gospel of John and the Book of Revelation.

During 249, a major persecution was carried out in Alexandria by a polytheist mob, and hundreds of Christians were assaulted, stoned, burned or cut down on account of their refusal to deny their faith. Dionysius managed to survive that persecution and subsequent civil war. In January 250, the new emperor Decius issued a decree of legal persecution. Out of fear, many Christians denied their faith by offering a token polytheist sacrifice, and others attempted to obtain false documents affirming their sacrifice. Those who refused to sacrifice faced public ridicule and shame and, if found by the authorities, torture and execution. Many fled from the city into the desert, where most succumbed to exposure, hunger, thirst, or attacks by bandits or wild animals.

The prefect Aurelius Appius Sabinus pursued Dionysius himself. Sabinus sent an assassin to murder him on sight. Dionysius spent three days in hiding before departing with his servants and other loyal brethren on the fourth night of the Decian decree. After a brush with a group of soldiers, he managed to escape with two of his followers and set up a residence in the Libyan Desert until the end of the persecution the following year.

He supported Pope Cornelius in the controversy of 251, arising when Novatian, a learned presbyter of the Church at Rome, set up a schismatic church with a rigorist position against communing Christians who had apostatized during the persecution. In opposition to Novatian's teaching, Dionysius ordered that the Eucharist should be refused to no one who asked it at the hour of death, even those who had previously lapsed.

In 252, the Plague of Cyprian broke out in Alexandria, and Dionysius and other clergy assisted the sick and dying.

Christian persecutions subsided somewhat under Trebonianus Gallus but were renewed under his successor Valerian. Dionysius was imprisoned and then exiled under Valerian. When Gallienus took over the empire, he released all the believers who were in prison and brought back those in exile. Gallienus wrote a letter to Dionysius and other bishops, ensuring their safety and ability to reopen their churches.

During the debate between Pope Stephen and Cyprian, Dionysius supported the position of Stephen but supported the autonomy of the African churches.

== Legacy ==
Basil of Caesarea wrote to Pope Damasus I about aid sent, by Dionysius, to the church at Caesarea. That correspondence is cited by Pope Pius IX in his encyclical Praedecessores Nostros (On Aid For Ireland) of 25 March 1847.

English writer John Milton, in his 1644 tract Areopagitica, discusses the letter of Dionysius to Philemon, in which Dionysius admits to reading heretical texts in order to learn how to refute them and narrates a divine vision telling him, "Read any books what ever come to thy hands, for thou art sufficient both to judge aright, and to examine each matter."

Titles of the Great Christian Church
| Preceded by Heraclas | Pope and Patriarch of Alexandria; 248—264 | Succeeded by Maximus |
