= Pope Anianus of Alexandria =

Head of the Coptic Church from c. 61 to 86 CE

Saint Anianus of Alexandria
- Patriarch of Alexandria
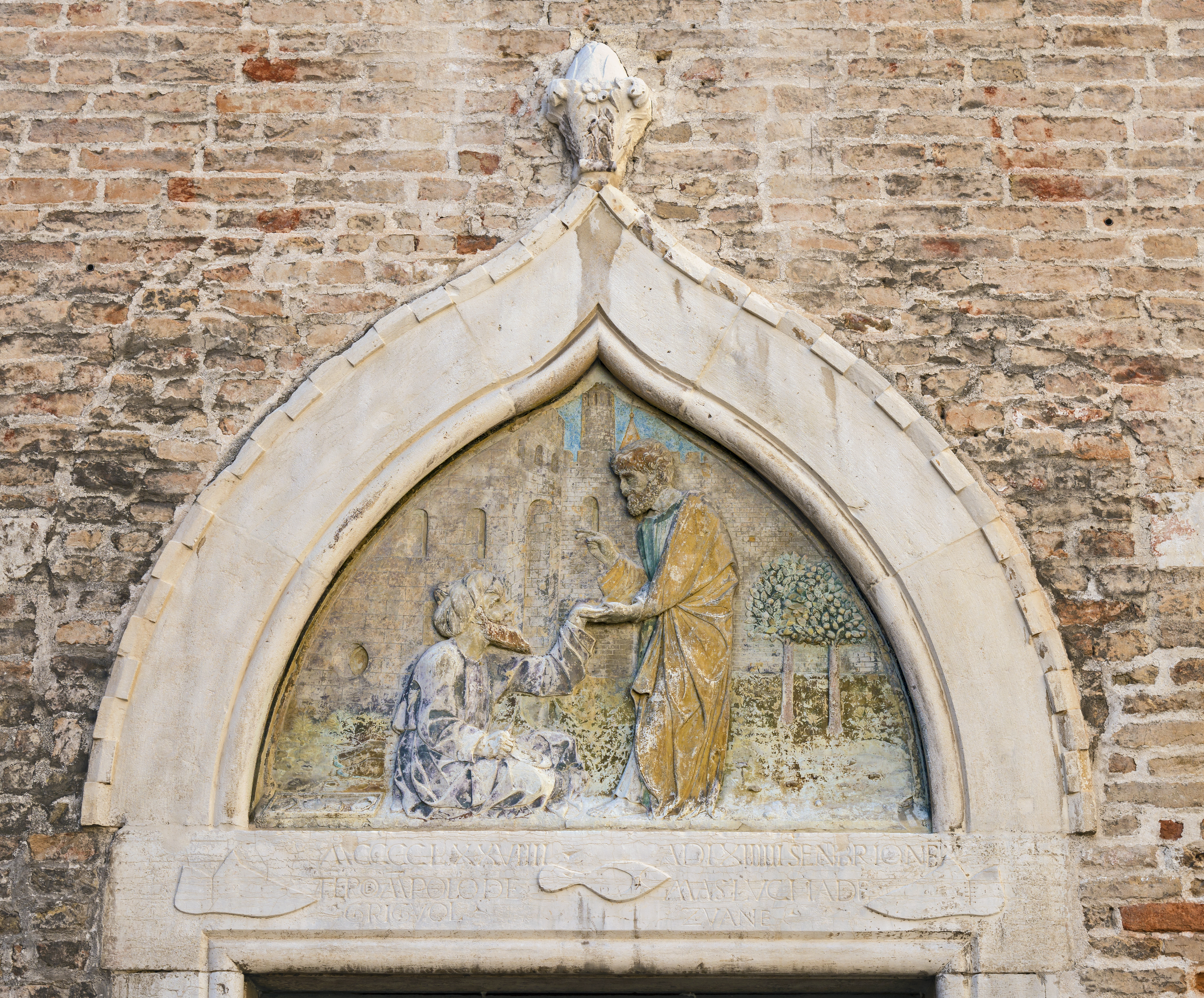
- Relief of St. Mark and Anianus by Pietro Lombardo, 1478
- Papacy began: c. 61
- Papacy ended: 20 Hathor 86
- Predecessor: Mark the Evangelist
- Successor: Avilius

Orders
- Ordination: 62 AD (Bishop of Alexandria)

Personal details
- Born: Anianus Alexandria, Province of Egypt, Roman Empire
- Died: 20 Hathor 86 Alexandria, Province of Egypt, Roman Empire
- Buried: Baucalis, Alexandria
- Denomination: Church of Alexandria
- Residence: Saint Mark's Church

Sainthood
- Feast day: 20 Hathor (Coptic Christianity); 25 April (Chalcedonian)
- Venerated in: Eastern Christianity and Western Christianity
- Patronage: Cobblers

Pope Anianus (Greek: Ανιανός, transliterated: Anianós) was the second Patriarch of Alexandria. He was ordained by Saint Mark the Evangelist, and was also the first convert Mark won to Christianity in the region.

== Connection with Saint Mark ==
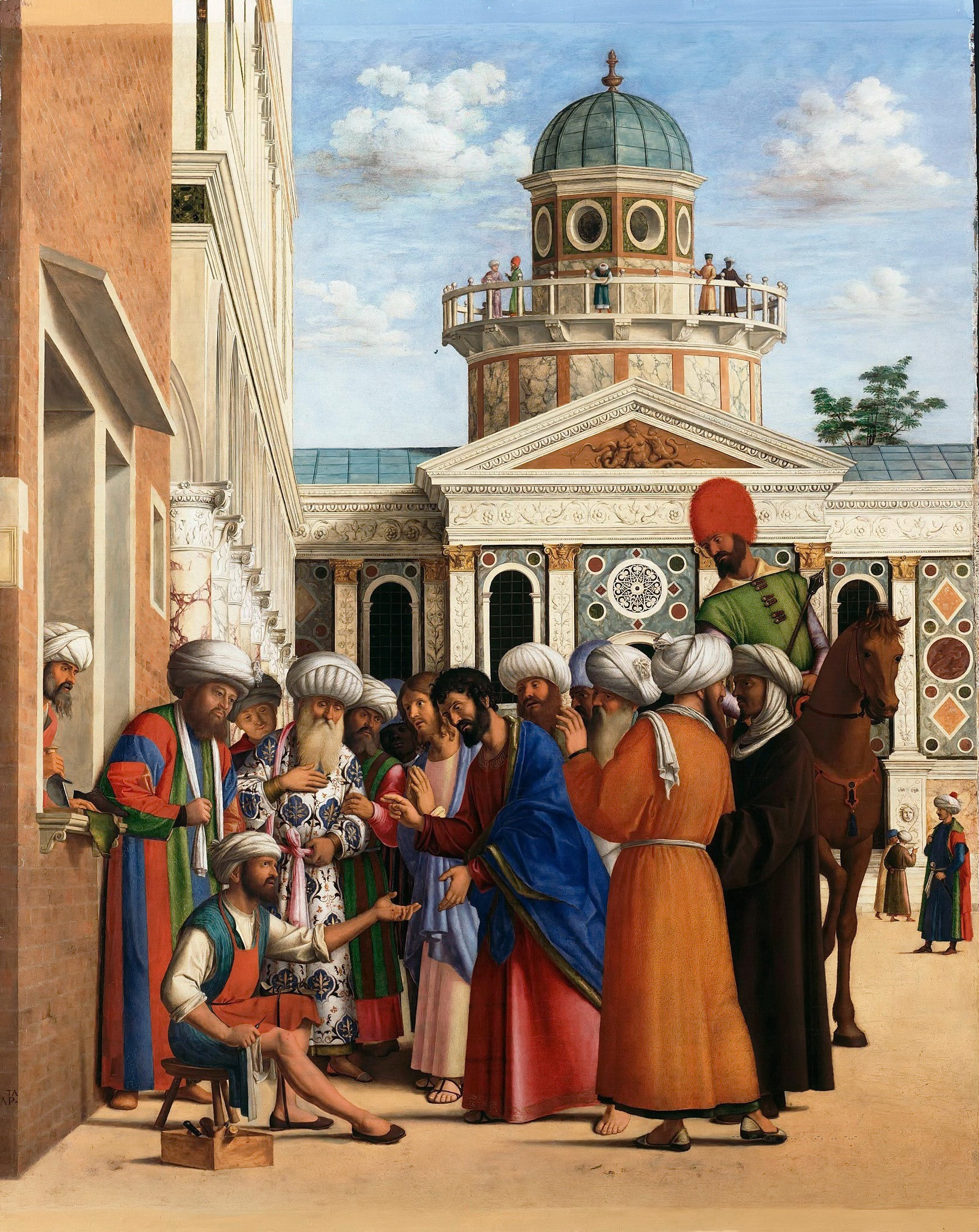
The Healing of Anianus by Cima da Conegliano

As St. Mark was entering Rakotis, a suburb of Alexandria, after his trip from Cyrene to the Pentapolis, the strap of his sandal fell off. He found a cobbler, St. Anianus, to repair it. While he was working on the sandal, the awl slipped in Anianus' hand, piercing it. Anianus cried '"Heis ho Theos" ("God is one") in response to the pain. Mark took the opportunity to say the Gospel of Christianity to him, at the same time reportedly miraculously healing Anianus of his wound.

How it was that Anianus was a monotheist in Alexandria is a matter of conjecture. Some have suggested that he was himself a Jew, or perhaps a pagan native who had come under the influence of the wealthy Jewish community, and learned his monotheistic beliefs there. Others have held that Anianus was a noble, although this does seem to be contrary to the documents available.

In any event, Mark was invited to Anianus's house, where he taught Anianus' family the Gospel and baptized them all. A large number of natives of the area were quickly converted by Mark and his followers, causing those citizens who did not convert to feel obliged to defend their local gods against the new faith.

== Ordination of Anianus ==
Mark, the outsider, decided it might be best if he were to leave the area for a while. He ordained Anianus to be bishop in his absence. He also ordained three presbyters and seven deacons at the same time, charging the group of them with watching over the church of the area in his absence.

Mark was gone for a period of two years, during which time he is said to have gone to Rome, Aquileia, and the Pentapolis, preaching, performing miracles, and winning converts to Christianity at each location. On Mark's return, he found that the church in Alexandria had grown significantly, and that they were able to build a church for themselves at Bucolia on the shore of the eastern harbor of Alexandria, also known as the Portus Magnus of the Ptolemaic dynasty.

Following the martyrdom of Mark on the 30th day of Baramudah, Anianus became the patriarch of the church in Alexandria. He would remain in that capacity for over seventeen and one-half years. During that time, the number of Christians in the area grew significantly, and Anianus ordained new priests and deacons for the growing church. The extent of the evangelization they performed is unknown, although it has been thought by some that it was done at least somewhat covertly, given the hostility the pagan population demonstrated to the new faith. Anianus died in bed, and was buried next to Mark at the church in Baucalis.

== Dispute ==
It is a matter of some dispute whether Anianus was the first or second Patriarch of Alexandria. The Catholic Church and some others hold that Anianus was the first patriarch. The Coptic Orthodox Church of Alexandria holds that Mark was the first patriarch of Alexandria, making Anianus second.

== Veneration ==
He is regarded as a saint, with a feast day of 20 Hathor in the Coptic Orthodox Church and 25 April in the Catholic Church and Eastern Orthodox Church.

== Church Dedications ==
The church of St. Anianus in Monroe Township, NJ is the first Coptic Orthodox Church in the world dedicated in the name of St. Anianus.

Titles of the Great Christian Church
| Preceded by Mark the Evangelist | Patriarch of Alexandria; 61-83 | Succeeded by Avilius |
