= Battle of Alexandria =

Battle of Alexandria, Raid on Alexandria, or Siege of Alexandria may refer to one of these military operations fought in or near the city of Alexandria, Egypt:

- Siege of Alexandria (169 BC), during the Syrian Wars
- Siege of Alexandria (47 BC), during Caesar's Civil War
- Battle of Alexandria (30 BC), fought between Roman forces during the Final War of the Roman Republic
- Siege of Alexandria (297–298), during a rebellion in Roman Egypt
- Siege of Alexandria (619), conducted by the Sassanid Empire against a Byzantine Empire garrison between 618 and 620 during the Sassanid conquest of Egypt
- Siege of Alexandria (641), conducted by the Rashidun army against the Byzantine capital during the Muslim Conquest of Egypt
- Siege of Alexandria (1167), Crusader attack on Saladin
- Siege of Alexandria (1174), Norman Sicilian attack
- Alexandrian Crusade (1365)
- Capture of Alexandria (1798), fought between French and Mamluk forces during the Napoleonic campaign in Egypt
- Battle of Alexandria (1801), 21 March, a major battle fought between British and French forces during the French Revolutionary War
- Siege of Alexandria (1801), 17 August – 2 September, the subsequent British siege of the city and French surrender
- Greek raid on Alexandria (1825), a raid on Alexandria harbour during the Greek War of Independence
- Bombardment of Alexandria (1881), British naval bombardment of the city
- Raid on Alexandria (1941), an attack on British shipping by Italian special forces during the Second World War
- The Battle of Alexandria (painting), the painting by Philip James de Loutherbourg
