= Pope Theonas of Alexandria =

Head of the Coptic Church from 282 to 300

Saint Theonas of Alexandria
- Pope and Patriarch of Alexandria
- Papacy began: 282
- Papacy ended: 300
- Predecessor: Maximus
- Successor: Peter "Seal of the Martyrs"

Personal details
- Born: Egypt
- Died: 23 August or 28 December 300 Egypt
- Buried: Church of the Cave, Alexandria

Sainthood
- Feast day: 10 January (2 Toba in the Coptic calendar), 28 December and 23 August in the Roman calendar

Pope Theonas of Alexandria was the 16th Pope and Patriarch of Alexandria, reigning from 282 to 300.

== Life ==
Theonas was a scholar who built a church in Alexandria, Egypt dedicated to the name of the Virgin St. Mary, the Theotokos.

Until his time, the faithful were praying and performing their services in homes and in caves for fear of the unbelievers. Pope Theonas dealt with them wisely and gently to achieve what he wanted to do. He converted many of them to believe in the Lord Christ and baptized them.

He baptized Peter, who succeeded him on the apostolic throne of St. Mark as the 17th Pope. It was said that he ordained Peter as a reader at the age of five, then he promoted him to be a deacon at the age of twelve, then as a priest at sixteen.

At the time of this patriarch, a man by the name of Sabellius appeared in Alexandria who was teaching that the Father, the Son, and the Holy Spirit are one person. Theonas excommunicated him.

His feast day is 2 Toba.

== Butler's account ==
The hagiographer Alban Butler (1710–1773) wrote in his Lives of the Fathers, Martyrs, and Other Principal Saints under August 23,

St. Theonas, Bishop of Alexandria, Confessor

HE succeeded St. Maximus in that patriarchal chair in 282, and held it almost nineteen years, being himself, by the shining light of his sanctity and learning, the greatest ornament of that church at a time when it was in both respects most flourishing. St. Pierius was then priest and catechist in that church, and supported the high reputation of its school, so as to be styled himself the young Origen. Among the many works which Pierius left, nothing but some few fragments have reached us. Photius tells us, that in a book which he wrote upon St. Luke's gospel, he proved that the disrespect which is shown to images falls back upon that which they represent. St. Theonas himself wrote a useful letter of instruction, how the Christians who lived in the emperor's court ought to behave; it was addressed to Lucian, first chamberlain to the Emperor Dioclesian. St. Theonas died in 300, and was succeeded by St. Peter. St. Alexander built in that city a church dedicated to God, under the patronage of St. Theonas. See St. Jerom, Eusebius, Cave, Hist. Liter., p. 172. Ceillier, t. 3. Du Pin, Bibl. p. 156.

== Sources ==
- Butler, Alban (1866), "August 23", The Lives of the Saints, vol. VIII: August This article incorporates text from this source, which is in the public domain.

Titles of the Great Christian Church
Preceded by Maximus	Pope and Patriarch of Alexandria; 282—300	Succeeded by Peter I
