= Peter I of Alexandria =

Head of the Coptic Church from 300 to 311

Saint Pope Peter of Alexandria
- Seal of the Martyrs
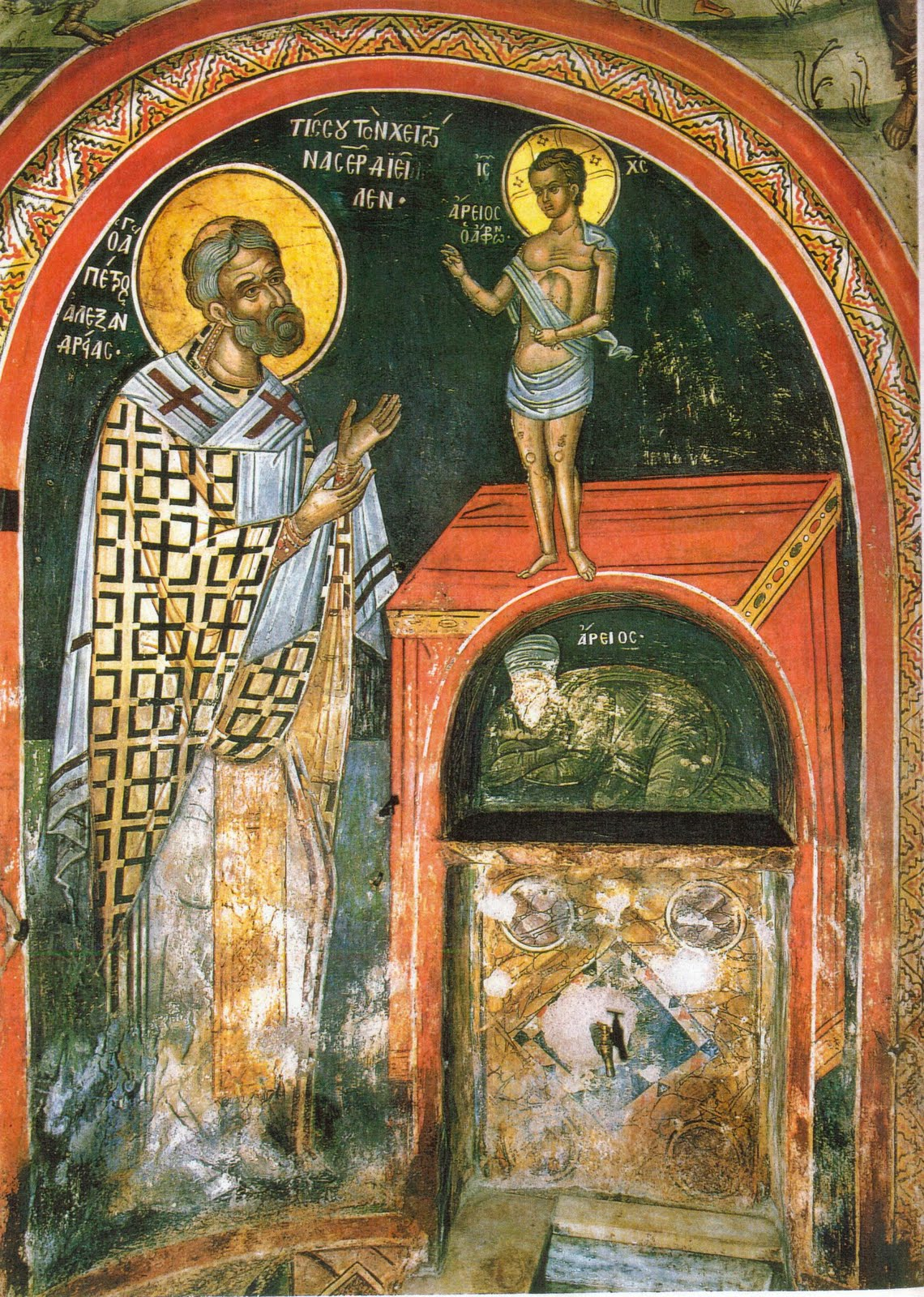
- Vision of Peter of Alexandria (Dionysiou Monastery)
- Church: Church of Alexandria
- Archdiocese: Alexandria
- See: Alexandria
- Predecessor: Theonas of Alexandria
- Successor: Achillas of Alexandria

Personal details
- Born: 3rd century Alexandria, Egypt
- Died: 25 November 311 Alexandria, Egypt

Sainthood
- Feast day: 25 November; 29 Hathor (Coptic church)
- Venerated in: Catholic Church; Eastern Orthodox Church; Oriental Orthodoxy (Coptic Orthodox Church)
- Title as Saint: Hieromartyr, “the Seal of the Martyrs“
- Attributes: Vested as a bishop, holding a Gospel Book

Pope Peter I of Alexandria (Greek: Πέτρος Α΄ Αλεξανδρείας, Coptic: Ⲡⲁⲡⲁ Ⲁⲃⲃⲁ ⲡⲉⲧⲣⲟⲥ ⲁ̅, ⲡⲓⲁⲅⲓⲟⲥ ⲡⲉⲧⲣⲟⲥ ⲓⲉⲣⲟⲙⲁⲣⲧⲩⲣⲟⲥ ⲡⲓⲁⲣⲭⲏⲉⲣⲉⲩⲥ) was the 17th Pope and Patriarch of Alexandria from 300 to 311. He is revered as a saint by the Coptic Orthodox Church, the Eastern Orthodox Church, and the Catholic Church.

== Life ==
Peter was born and raised in Alexandria. The Coptic Orthodox Church believes that Peter was given by his parents to Theonas to be brought up as a priest, similarly to the story of Samuel in the Old Testament. He rose through the ranks of holy orders, first becoming a reader, then a deacon, then a priest. Highly educated, Peter became head of the school of Alexandria.

In early 300, while on his death bed, Theonas advised the church leaders to choose Peter as his successor, which they did. Peter's time as bishop included the Diocletianic Persecution, which began in 303, and continued intermittently over the next ten years. Forced into exile from the city during the anti-Christian persecutions, Peter traveled through many lands, encouraging his flock by letter, before returning to his city to guide the Alexandrian Church personally during this period. He secretly visited those imprisoned, assisted widows and orphans, and conducted clandestine services.

Accounts of Peter's position during the persecution vary, but one states that he was imprisoned for a time with bishop Meletius of Lycopolis and they fell into an argument over the treatment of Christians who had either offered pagan sacrifice or surrendered scriptures to the authorities to save their lives during the persecution. Peter urged leniency while Meletius held firmly that the lapsed had abandoned their faith and needed to be rebaptised. Their argument became heated, and was ended when Peter hung a curtain between him and Meletius. One of Meletius' followers was a priest named Arius (modern scholarship differs on whether this was the same Arius as became involved with the Arian controversy a few years later). According to Severus of Ashmumeen, Arius tried in vain to receive absolution from the Patriarch before Peter was executed, and before dying Peter anathematized Arius as a heretic and excommunicated him.

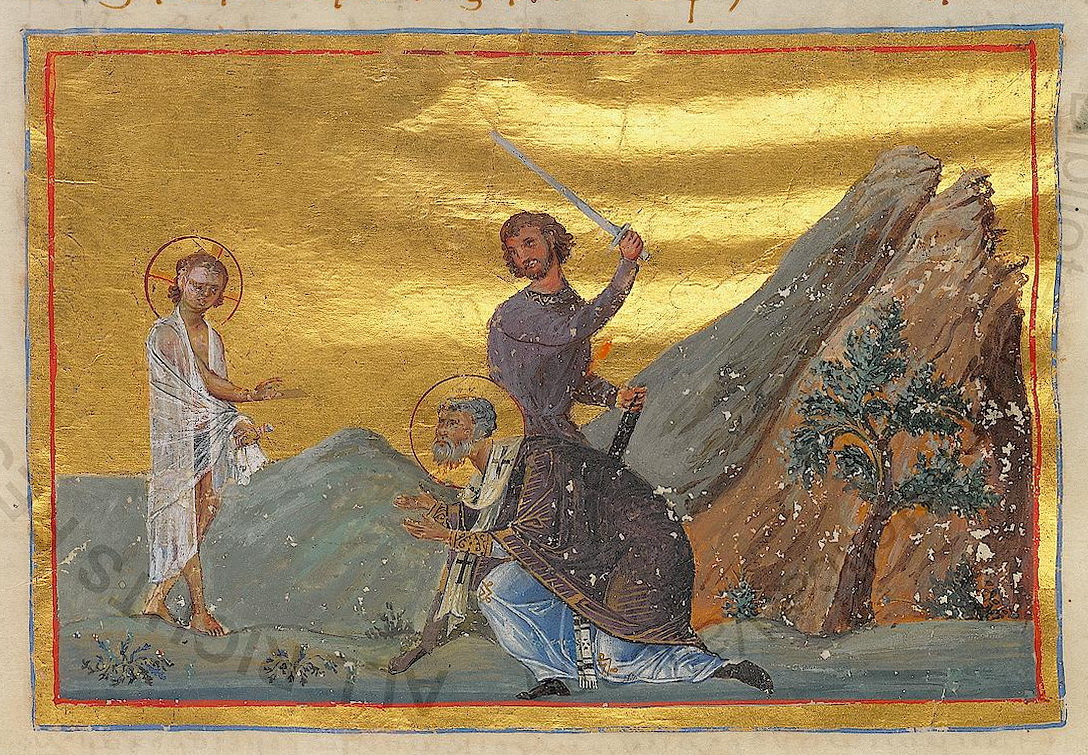
The execution of the patriarch Peter of Alexandria under the emperor Maximinus Daia, depicted in the Menologion of Basil II, an illuminated manuscript prepared for the emperor Basil II in c. 1000.

== Martyrdom ==
The tenth-century historian Severus of Ashmumeen gives us an account of how during the Diocletianic Persecution the Patriarch was seized and thrown in prison. When the emperor was informed about this, he ordered Peter to be beheaded. This was hindered by a large number of Christians who gathered at the prison willing to die for their Patriarch. The soldiers delayed the execution because they neither wanted to massacre the crowd nor create a riot.

The Patriarch, fearing for the life of his people, advised the soldiers with a plan to smuggle him out of jail by breaking a hole in a certain wall which he would point out. He could then be smuggled out and receive his sentence.

Severus of Ashmumeen describes the moment when the Patriarch was martyred:

And he took off his omophorion, and bared his neck, which was pure before the Lord, and said to them: «Do as you have been commanded». But the soldiers feared that trouble would befall them because of him. So they looked one at another, and not one of them dared to cut off his head, because of the dread which had fallen upon them. Then they took counsel together and said: «To him that cuts off his head each one of us will give five denarii». Now they were six persons; and one of them had some money; so he took out five and twenty denarii from among the coins and said : «He that will go up to him, and cut off his head, shall receive this money from me and from the four others». So one of the men went forward, and summoned up his courage, and cut off the head of the holy martyr and patriarch Peter; that day being the 29th of Hatur.

Hatur is a month in the Coptic calendar, corresponding roughly to November. Saint Peter's martyrdom occurred in the year AD 311.

== Feast day ==
Traditionally, in Christianity, the day of a saint's death is the day on which his feast day is celebrated. 29 Hatur corresponds to 25 November in the Julian calendar (to 26 November if the following Julian year is a leap year). Thus 29 Hatur corresponds at present to the Gregorian Calendar 8 December or 9 December (see Old Style and New Style dates).

== See also ==
- Baucalis

== Notes ==
Titles of the Great Christian Church
Preceded by Theonas	Pope and Patriarch of Alexandria; 300—311	Succeeded by Achillas
