= Pantaenus =

Greek Christian theologian (died c. 200)

Saint Pantaenus the Philosopher
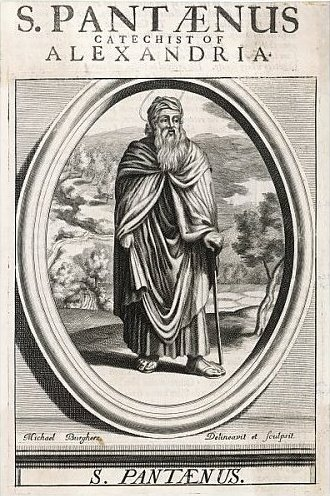

Missionary, Philosopher
- Born: 2nd century AD; Sicily
- Died: c. 200; Alexandria, Egypt
- Venerated in: Roman Catholic Church; Oriental Orthodox Church; Eastern Orthodox Church
- Canonized: Pre-Congregation
- Feast: July 7
- Attributes: lecturing from a pulpit

Philosophical work
- Era: Ancient philosophy
- Region: Western philosophy
- School: Stoicism
- Institutions: Catechetical School of Alexandria
- Main interests: Christian theology

Pantaenus the Philosopher (Greek: Πάνταινος; died c. 200) was a Sicilian theologian and a significant figure in the Catechetical School of Alexandria from around AD 180. This school was the earliest catechetical school, and became influential in the development of Christian theology.

== Biography ==
=== Stoic philosopher ===
Pantaenus was a Stoic philosopher teaching in Alexandria. He was a native of Sicily.

=== Convert to Christianity ===
He converted to the Christian faith, and sought to reconcile his new faith with Greek philosophy. His most famous student, Clement, who was his successor as head of the Catechetical School, described Pantaenus as "the Sicilian bee". Although no writings by Pantaenus are extant, his legacy is known by the influence of the Catecheticaar in the early debates on the interpretation of the Bible, the Trinity, and Christology. He was the main supporter of Serapion of Antioch for acting against the influence of Gnosticism.

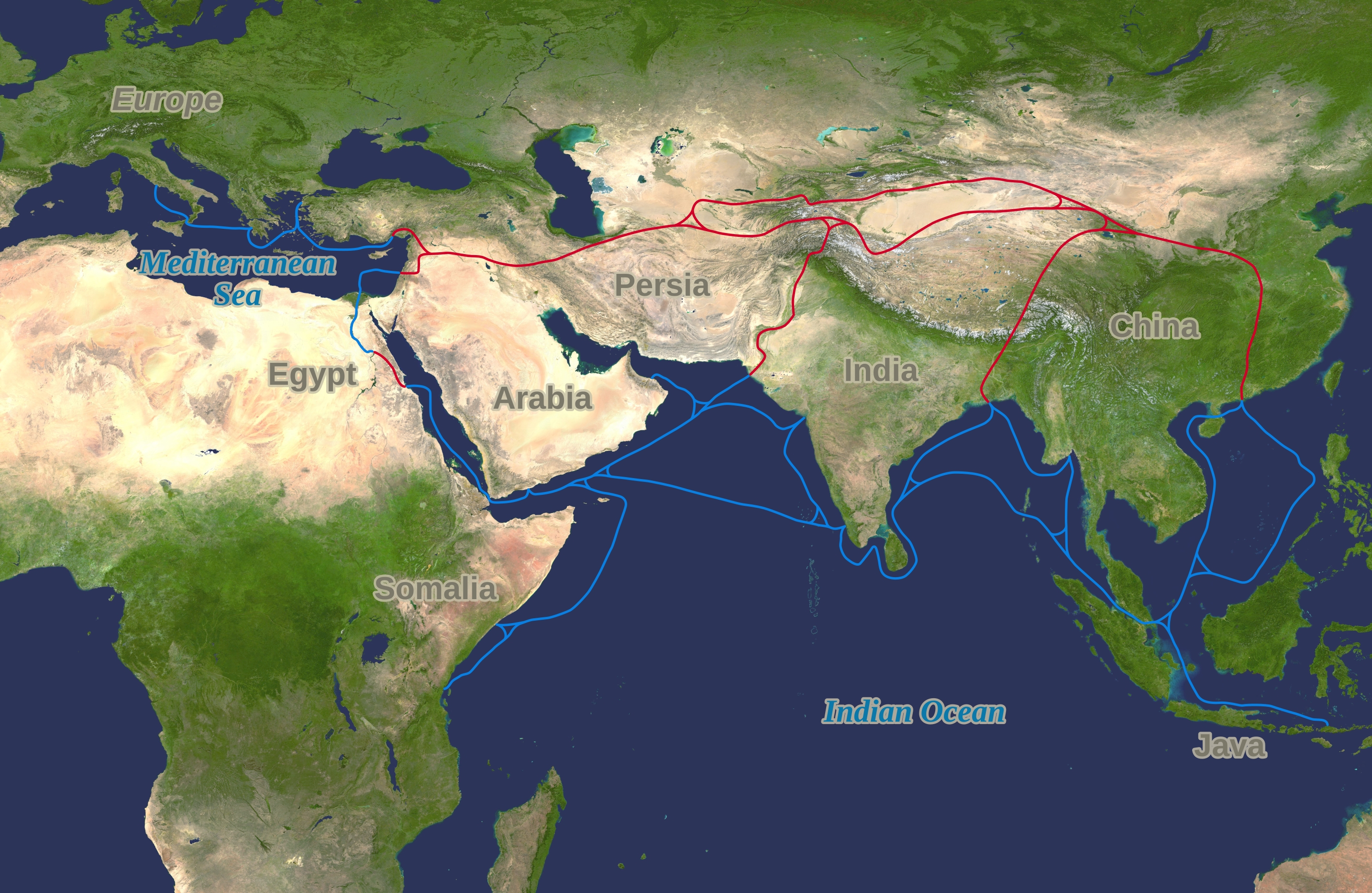
Silk Road map showing ancient trade routes

In addition to his work as a teacher, Eusebius of Caesarea reports that Pantaenus was for a time a missionary, traveling as far as India where, according to Eusebius, he found Christian communities using the Gospel of Matthew written in "Hebrew letters", supposedly left them by the Apostle Bartholomew (and which might have been the Gospel of the Hebrews). However, some writers have suggested that having difficulty with the language of Saint Thomas Christians, Pantaenus misinterpreted their reference to Mar Thoma (the Aramaic term meaning Saint Thomas), who is currently credited with bringing Christianity to India in the 1st century by the Syrian Churches, as Bar Tolmai (the Hebrew name of Bartholomew). The ancient seaport Muziris on the Malabar Coast (modern-day Kerala in India) was frequented by the Egyptians in the early centuries AD.

Jerome (c. 347 – 30 September 420), apparently relying entirely on Eusebius' evidence from Historia Ecclesiastica, wrote that Pantaenus visited India, “to preach Christ to the Brahmans and philosophers there.” It is unlikely that Jerome has any information about Pantaenus' mission to India that is independent of Eusebius. On the other hand, his claim that "many" of Pantaenus' Biblical commentaries were still extant is probably based on Jerome's own knowledge.

His feast day as July 7.

The Coptic synaxarium mentions "Pantaenus and Clement" in its entry regarding the return of the relics of Mark the Apostle by Pope Paul VI of Rome on 15 Paoni but does not assign Pantaenus any specific feast date.

== 19th century and modern study on Pantaenus ==
The Universalist Church of America historian J. W. Hanson, and Catholic patristic scholar Illaria Ramelli argued that Pantaenus taught universalism to Clement of Alexandria and Origen. However, scholar Andrew C. Itter argues that Clement of Alexandria's supposed "universalism" had tension between salvation and free will, and that he may have not embraced a strict apokatastasis, which puts the claim of J. W. Hanson and Illaria Ramelli at question.
