= Baucalis =

Baucalis, also called Boukolou, and Baukalis, is a section in Alexandria, Egypt where St. Mark was reported to have been martyred, along with the historic location of his martyrium. It is also where Arius (Greek: Ἄρειος, AD 250 or 256–336) was a Christian presbyter and priest. It is now part of the modern Mahatet El Raml district

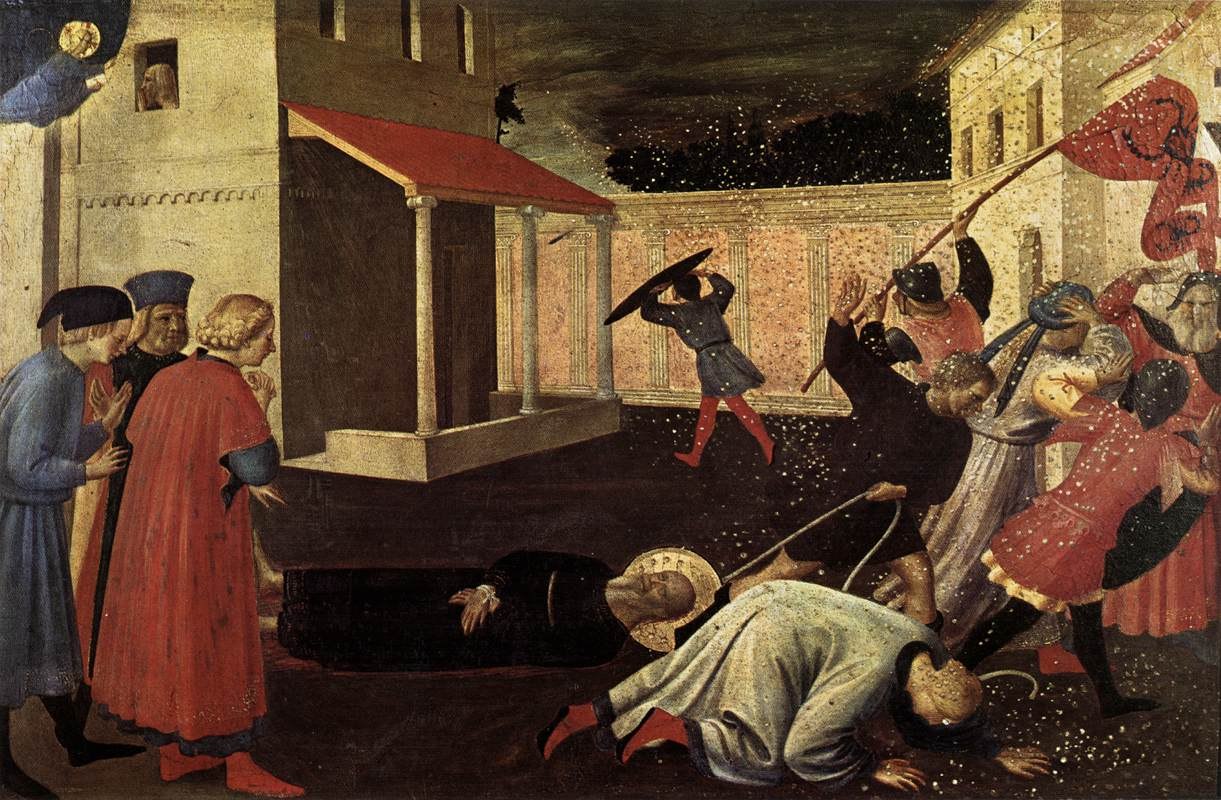
The Martyrdom of St. Mark by Fra Angelico

Coptic Church tradition holds that the city of Alexandria was evangelized for the first time by St. Mark. The first Christians there built a church for Mark at Baucalis. According to tradition, St. Mark was attacked by a crowd of pagans on Easter Sunday 68 AD in the Church at Baucalis, dragged through the streets and martyred. His followers were able to save his body and place it in a tomb under the altar of the church. The Acts of St. Mark report that the church of Baucalis was "built in the area beside the sea under the crags called 'Boukolou'." There is some indication that the church was built on the site of an earlier shrine to Serapis.

Coptic tradition also tells that his body was still at Baucalis as late as 311 AD, when Pope Peter of Alexandria was martyred at the same site. According to the Martyrdom of St. Peter (Acta or Passio Sancti Petri), the tribunes who would later have him beheaded allowed him to first visit the tomb of St. Mark at "the place called Boukolou." He prayed to St. Mark for his intercession, that he might be martyred joyously. After exiting the tomb, the tribunes beheaded him in an area just south of Mark's martyrium.

Later, Patriarchs of Alexandria were elected at the Church of Baucalis, as the oldest church in the city. The original church of Baucalis was abandoned around the fifth century, and its exact historic location is unknown. Some speculation centers on the area around the current location of the 1920s era College of St. Mark.

Arius, son of Ammonius, was a popular priest appointed presbyter for the district of Baucalis in 313. After his condemnation in 321, Arius withdrew to Palestine with the support of Eusebius of Caesarea.
