= Church of Alexandria =

Christian church in Egypt

The Church of Alexandria in Egypt was the Christian church headed by the patriarch of Alexandria. It was one of the five sees of the pentarchy, alongside Rome, Antioch, Constantinople and Jerusalem.

Tradition holds that Saint Mark the Evangelist founded the Church of Alexandria c. 49 AD. Alexandrian Christianity greatly influenced the early Church in much of Africa. Alexandria claims jurisdiction over all Christians on the African continent.

Today, three churches claim to be direct heirs of the original Church of Alexandria:

- The Coptic Orthodox Church (Coptic Orthodox Patriarchate of Alexandria), an Oriental Orthodox church
- The Greek Orthodox Church of Alexandria (Patriarchate of Alexandria and All Africa), part of the wider Eastern Orthodox Church
- The Coptic Catholic Church, one of 23 Eastern Catholic churches in full communion with the Catholic Church led by the Bishop of Rome

Formerly the Latin Patriarchate of Alexandria also did so.
