= Patriarch of Alexandria =

Archbishop of Alexandria, Egypt; includes the designation "pope"

Christian

Information
- First holder: Saint Mark
- Denomination: Catholic, Oriental Orthodox, Eastern Orthodox,
- Sui iuris church: Coptic Orthodox, Coptic Catholic, Melkite, Greek Orthodox
- Rite: Coptic Rite, Byzantine Rite
- Established: 42 (founded); 381 (granted title of patriarch)

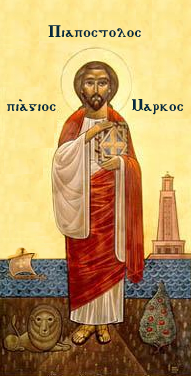
Coptic icon of Saint Mark the Evangelist, the apostolic founder of the Church of Alexandria, and the first Primate of Alexandria

The Patriarch of Alexandria is the archbishop of Alexandria, Egypt. Historically, this office has included the designation "pope" (etymologically "Father", like "Abbot").

The Alexandrian episcopate was revered as one of the three major episcopal sees (along with Rome and Antioch) before Constantinople and Jerusalem were granted similar status (in 381 and 451, respectively). Alexandria was elevated to de facto archiepiscopal status by the Councils of Alexandria, and this status was ratified by Canon Six of the First Council of Nicaea, which stipulated that all the Egyptian episcopal provinces were subject to the metropolitan see of Alexandria. In the sixth century, these five archbishops were formally granted the title of "patriarch" and were subsequently known as the Pentarchy.

Due to several schisms within Christianity, the title of the Patriarch of Alexandria is currently claimed by different churches (two of which are part of the Catholic Church) and held respectively by four persons: the Coptic Orthodox Patriarch of Alexandria, the Coptic Catholic Patriarchate of Alexandria, the Melkite Patriarch of Antioch, Alexandria, Jerusalem, and all the East, and the Greek Orthodox Patriarch of Alexandria. Each of the respective churches consider their patriarch as the successor to the original early bishops of Alexandria. The title was also previously held by the Latin Patriarch of Alexandria. The vast majority of the population of Christians within Alexandria and Egypt, as well as almost all of the Egyptian monastic communities, are part of the Coptic Orthodox Patriarchate of Alexandria.

== History ==
According to church tradition, the patriarchate was founded in 42 AD by Mark the Evangelist. It was the centre from which Christianity spread throughout all Egypt. Within its jurisdiction, during its most flourishing period, were included about 108 bishops; its territory embraced the six provinces of Libya Superior, Libya Inferior, the Thebaid, Egypt, Heptanomis, and Augustamnica. In the beginning the successor of St. Mark was the only metropolitan bishop, and he governed ecclesiastically the entire territory. As the Christians multiplied, and other metropolitan sees were created, he became known the arch-metropolitan. The title of patriarch did not come into use until the fifth century.

Up to the time of the First Council of Constantinople (381) the Patriarch of Alexandria ranked next to the Bishop of Rome. By the third canon of this council, afterwards confirmed by the twenty-eighth canon of the Council of Chalcedon (451), the Patriarch of Constantinople, supported by imperial authority and by a variety of concurring advantages, was given the right of precedency over the Patriarch of Alexandria. But neither Rome nor Alexandria recognized the claim until many years later. During the first two centuries of the Church little is known of the ecclesiastical history of its chief see, beyond a barren list of the names of its patriarchs, handed down chiefly through the church historian Eusebius.

All denominations acknowledge the succession of church leaders until the time of the Second Council of Ephesus of 449 and the Council of Chalcedon in 451, which gave rise to the non-Chalcedonian Coptic Orthodox Church of Alexandria and the Chalcedonian Greek Orthodox Church of Alexandria.

== Pope ==
This office has historically held the title of Pope—Πάπας (Pápas), which means "Father" in Greek and Coptic—since Pope Heraclas of Alexandria, the 13th Alexandrine Bishop (227–248), was the first to associate "Pope" with the title of the Bishop of Alexandria.

The word pope derives from the Greek: πάππας "father". In the early centuries of Christianity, this title was applied informally (especially in the east) to all bishops and other senior clergy. In the west it began to be used particularly for the Bishop of Rome (rather than for bishops in general) in the sixth century; in 1075, Pope Gregory VII issued a declaration widely interpreted as stating this by-then-established convention. By the sixth century, this was also the normal practice in the imperial chancery of Constantinople.

The earliest record of this title was regarding Pope Heraclas of Alexandria (227–240) in a letter written by his successor, Pope Dionysius of Alexandria, to Philemon (a Roman presbyter): "τοῦτον ἐγὼ τὸν κανόνα καὶ τὸν τύπον παρὰ τοῦ μακαρίου πάπα ἡμῶν Ἡρακλᾶ παρέλαβον." This is translated, "I received this rule and ordinance from our blessed father/pope, Heraclas." According to the Oxford English Dictionary, the earliest recorded use of "pope" in English is in an Old English translation (c. 950) of Bede's Ecclesiastical History of the English People, "Þa wæs in þa tid Uitalius papa þæs apostolican seðles aldorbiscop." In modern English, "At that time, Pope Vitalian was chief bishop of the apostolic see."

== Claimants to the title ==
=== Coptic Orthodox Church of Alexandria ===
The Pope of Alexandria and Patriarch of all Africa in the Holy See of St. Mark the Apostle leads the Coptic Orthodox Church of Alexandria, but has resided in Cairo since Christodoulos moved the residence in the mid-eleventh century. His full titles are Pope and Archbishop of the Great City of Alexandria and Patriarch of all Africa, the Holy Orthodox and Apostolic See of Saint Mark the Evangelist (Egypt, Libya, Nubia, Sudan, Ethiopia, Eritrea and all Africa) and Successor of St. Mark the Evangelist, Holy Apostle and Martyr, on the Holy Apostolic Throne of the Great City of Alexandria.

=== Eastern Catholic Churches ===
The Patriarch of Alexandria of the Copts leads the Coptic Catholic Church in communion with the Holy See.

The Patriarch of Antioch of the Greek-Melkites, who leads the Melkite Greek Catholic Church in communion with the Holy See, also has the titles of Titular Patriarch of Alexandria of the Greek-Melkites and Titular Patriarch of Jerusalem of the Greek-Melkites.

=== Latin Church ===
The Latin Patriarch of Alexandria was head of the titular Patriarchal See of Alexandria of the Catholic Church, established by Pope Innocent III. The title was last held by Luca Ermenegildo Pasetto until his death in 1954; it remained vacant until its abolition as a Latin Church see in 1964.

=== Greek Orthodox Church of Alexandria ===
The Greek Orthodox Patriarch of Alexandria and all Africa leads the Greek Orthodox Church of Alexandria. His full title is "His Divine Beatitude the Pope and Patriarch of the Great City of Alexandria, Libya, Pentapolis, Ethiopia, All Egypt and All Africa, Father of Fathers, Pastor of Pastors, Prelate of Prelates, the Thirteenth of the Apostles and Judge of the Universe".

== See also ==
- Baucalis
- List of patriarchs of Alexandria
- Pentarchy
- Primate of Africa

== Sources ==
- Grillmeier, Aloys; Hainthaler, Theresia (1996). Christ in Christian Tradition: The Church of Alexandria with Nubia and Ethiopia after 451. Vol. 2/4. Louisville: Westminster John Knox Press. ISBN 9780664223007.
