= Early bishops of Jerusalem =

This is a list of the bishops of Jerusalem before the Council of Chalcedon (451), which provoked a schism.

== Jewish bishops of Jerusalem ==
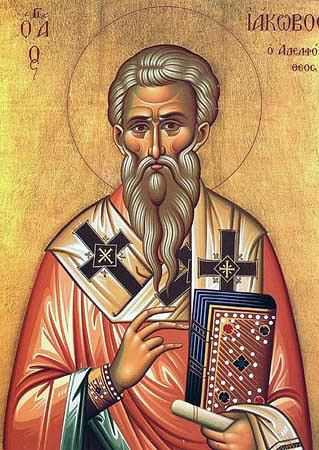
James the Just, whose judgment was adopted in the Apostolic Decree of Acts 15:19–29, "...we should write to them [Gentiles] to abstain only from things polluted by idols and from fornication and from whatever has been strangled and from blood..." (NRSV)

The early Christian community of Jerusalem was led by a Council of Elders, and considered itself part of the wider Jewish community. This collegiate system of government in Jerusalem is seen in Acts 11:30 and 15:22.

Eusebius provides the names of an unbroken succession of thirty-six Bishops of Jerusalem up to the year 324. The first fifteen of these bishops were of Jewish origin (from James the Just through Judas). Eusebius wrote that the bishops were Hebrew until Hadrian suppressed the Bar Kokhba revolt. After this the bishops were gentiles.

"But since the bishops of the circumcision ceased at this time [after Bar Kokhba's revolt], it is proper to give here a list of their names from the beginning. The first, then, was James, the so-called brother of the Lord; the second, Symeon; the third, Justus; the fourth, Zacchaeus; the fifth, Tobias; the sixth, Benjamin; the seventh, John; the eighth, Matthias; the ninth, Philip; the tenth, Seneca; the eleventh, Justus; the twelfth, Levi; the thirteenth, Ephres; the fourteenth, Joseph; and finally, the fifteenth, Judas. These are the bishops of Jerusalem that lived between the age of the apostles and the time referred to, all of them belonging to the circumcision."

1. James the Just (until 62)
2. Simeon I (62–107)
3. Justus I (107–113)
4. Zaccheus (113–116)
5. Tobias (116–116)
6. Benjamin I (116–117)
7. John I (117–119)
8. Matthias I (119–120)
9. Philip (120–124)
10. Senecas (124–1??)
11. Justus II (1??–1??)
12. Levis (1??–1??)
13. Ephram (1??–1??)
14. Joseph I (1??–1??)
15. Judas (1??–135)

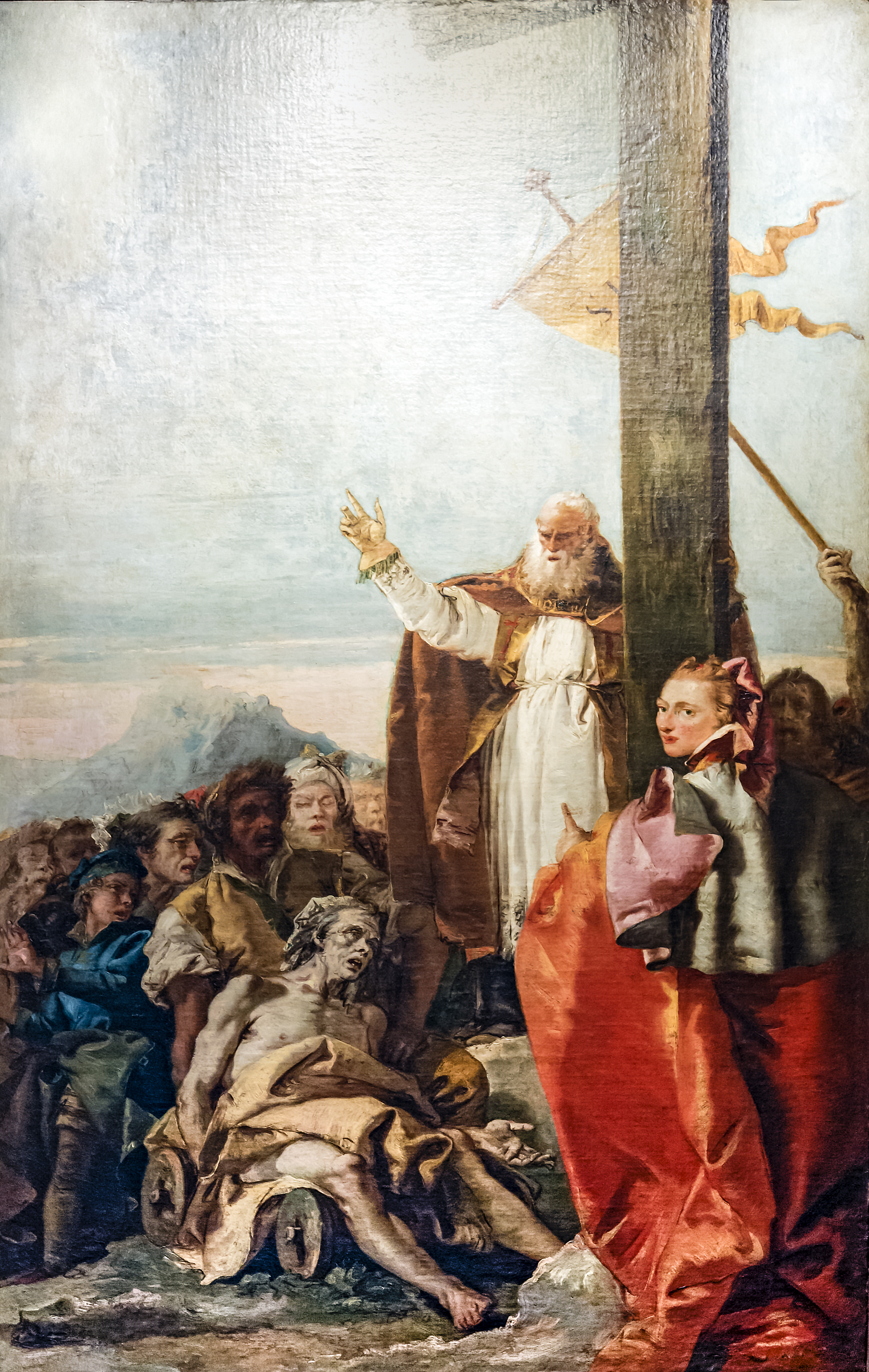
Macarius of Jerusalem

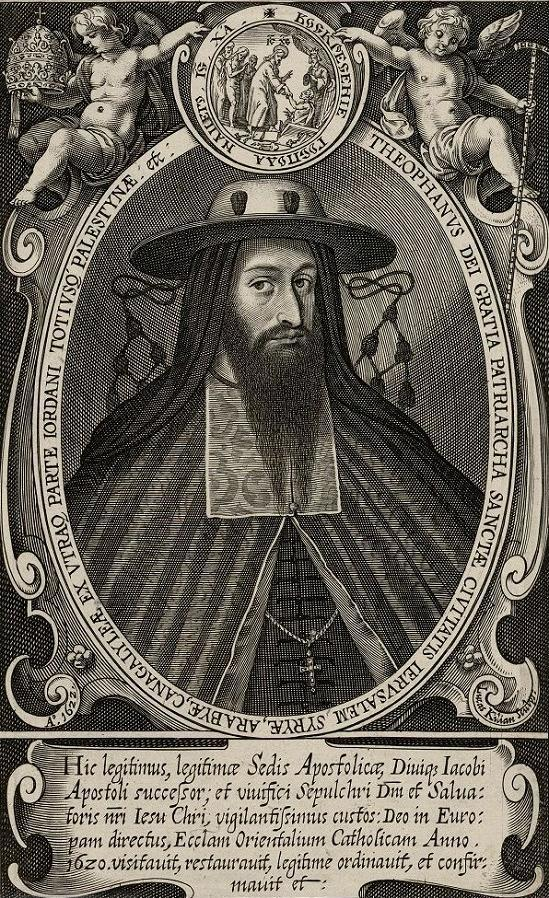
Theophanes III

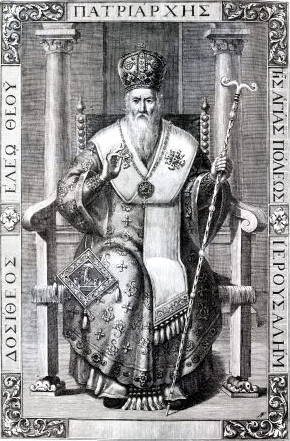
Dositheos II of Jerusalem

== Bishops of Aelia Capitolina ==
As a result of the Bar Kokhba revolt in 135, Hadrian was determined to erase Judaism from Iudaea Province. The province was renamed Syria Palaestina. Jerusalem was left in total ruin, and a new city built nearby called Aelia Capitolina. These Gentile bishops (Jews were excluded from the city except for the day of Tisha B'Av), were appointed under the authority of the Metropolitans of Caesarea. Until the setting up of the Patriarchates in 325, Metropolitan was the highest episcopal rank in the Christian church.

1. Marcus (135–???)
2. Cassianus (???–???)
3. Poplius (???–???)
4. Maximus I (???–???)
5. Julian I (???–???)
6. Gaius I (???–???)
7. Symmachus (???)
8. Gaius II (???–162)
9. Julian II (162–???)
10. Capion (???–???)
11. Maximus II (???–???)
12. Antoninus (???–???)
13. Valens (???–???)
14. Dolichianus (???–185)
15. Narcissus (185–???)
16. Dius (???–???)
17. Germanion (???–???)
18. Gordius (???–211)
  Narcissus (restored) (???–231)
19. Alexander (231–249)
20. Mazabanis (249–260)
21. Imeneus (260–276)
22. Zamudas (276–283)
23. Ermon (283–314)
24. Macarius I (314–333), since 325 Bishop of Jerusalem

== Bishops of Jerusalem ==
Jerusalem received special recognition in Canon VII of the First Council of Nicaea in 325, without yet becoming a metropolitan see. Also, the council for the first time established the Patriarchates. The Bishops of Jerusalem were appointed by the Patriarchs of Antioch.

- Macarius I (325–333)
- Maximus III (333–348)
- Cyril I (350–386)
- John II (386–417)
- Praulius (417–422)
- Juvenal (422–458), since 451 Patriarch

In 451 or 452, the anti-Chalcedonian clergy elected a rival bishop, Theodosius, who was forced into exile in 453. For the rival episcopal successions after this date:

- Greek Orthodox Patriarchs of Jerusalem
- Syriac Orthodox Bishops of Jerusalem
- Latin Patriarchs of Jerusalem

== Works cited ==
- Mitchell, Margaret; Young, Frances, eds. (2006). The Cambridge History of Christianity: Origins to Constantine. Vol. 1. Cambridge University Press. ISBN 9780521812399.
