= Catholic Church in Israel =

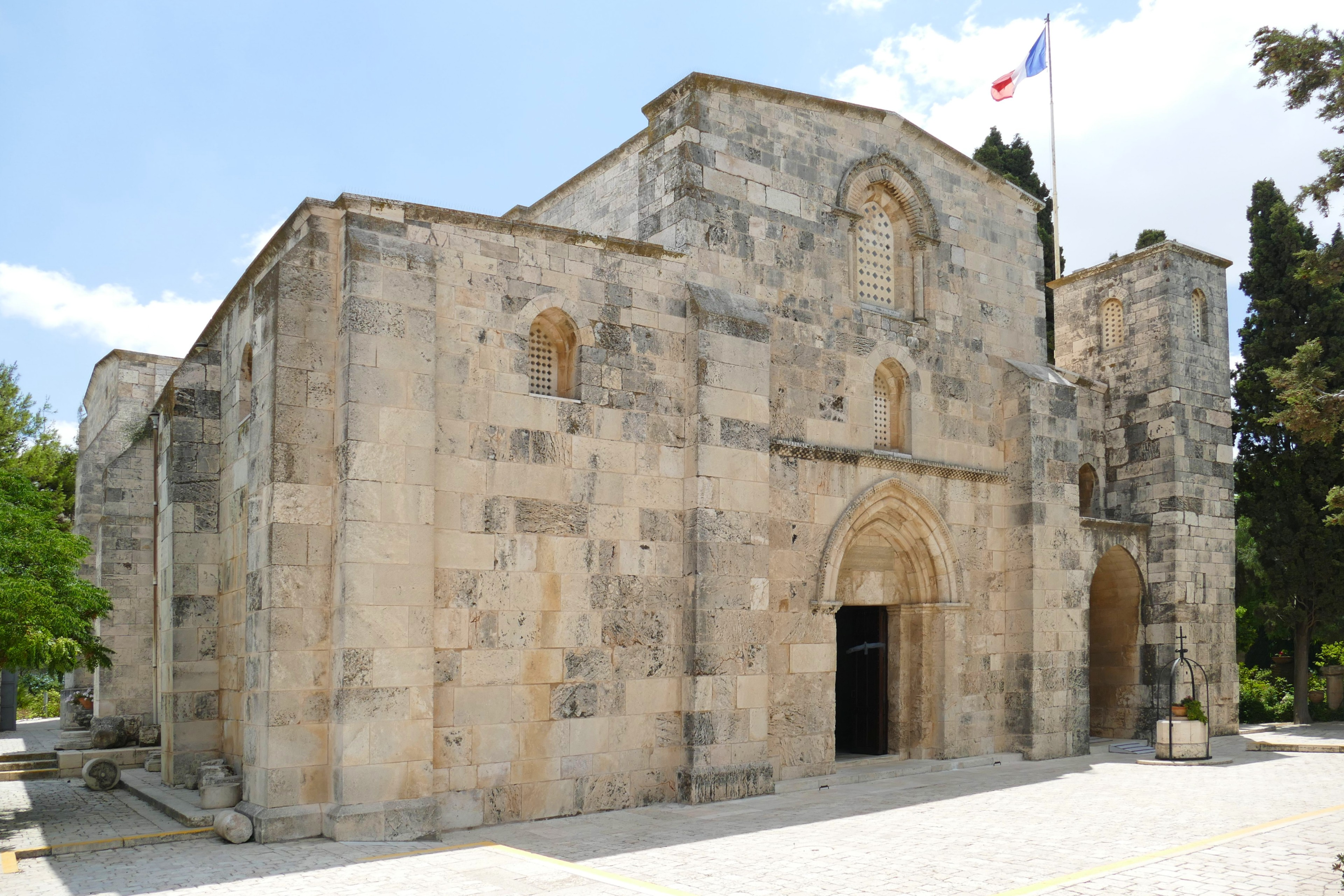
Church of Saint Anne, Jerusalem

The Catholic Church in Israel (Hebrew: הכנסייה הקתולית; Arabic: الكنيسة الكاثوليكية في إسرائيل; Latin: Catholicae Ecclesiae in Israel) is part of the worldwide Catholic Church, in full communion with the Holy See in Rome.

A number of institutions and organizations serve the Catholic community. The Melkite Church serves the largest number of Catholics. The Latin Patriarchate of Jerusalem is the main Roman Catholic institution in Israel, and it is responsible for the pastoral care of Roman Catholics in Israel, Palestine, and Jordan. The patriarchate has a number of parishes, schools, and hospitals in the region, and it also operates the Terra Sancta Museum in Jerusalem, which showcases the history and culture of the Holy Land.

The Franciscan Custody of the Holy Land is a Catholic religious order that is responsible for the care of the holy shrines in the Holy Land, such as the Church of the Holy Sepulchre in Jerusalem and the Church of the Nativity in Bethlehem. The Salesian Mission is another Catholic religious order that operates in Israel, particularly in the area of education and youth ministry.

In addition to these institutions, there are a number of Catholic organizations and charities that operate in Israel, such as the Catholic Near East Welfare Association, which provides humanitarian assistance to Christians and other minority communities in the Middle East, and the Catholic Relief Services, which works on issues such as poverty, education and health.

== Overview ==
At the start of the 21st century there were approximately 200,000 Christians in Israel and the Palestinian territories, representing about 1.5% of the total population. The largest Catholic Churches included 64,400 Greek Melkite Catholics, 32,200 Latin Catholics, and 11,270 Maronite Catholics. By 2020, Catholics made up 1.27% of the population, although some estimates were more than twice that.

Jurisdictions of seven of the Catholic Churches overlap in Israel: the Armenian, Chaldean, Greek Melkite, Latin (Roman), Maronite, and Syriac. The Coptic Catholic patriarchate also has representation in Israel and the Palestinian territories, as does the Franciscan Custody of the Holy Land, the Territorial Prelature of the Notre Dame Center of Jerusalem, and the Personal prelature of Opus Dei, with jurisdictional presence. The Holy See is represented by the Apostolic Nuncio to Israel and the Apostolic Delegate in Jerusalem for Palestine.

About 85% of the Catholics in Israel and the Palestinian territories are Arabic-speaking. In addition to a handful of chaplaincies for expatriate clergy, pilgrims, and workers, there is also a vicariate within the Latin Patriarchate ministering to Hebrew Catholics, i.e., converts to Catholicism of Jewish descent, or Hebrew-speaking Catholics born to immigrant workers, often from the Philippines.

== Local jurisdictions ==
=== Dioceses ===
- Latin Patriarchate of Jerusalem
- Melkite Greek Catholic Patriarchal Dependent Territory of Jerusalem
- Melkite Greek Catholic Eparchy of Akka
- Maronite Catholic Archeparchy of Haifa and the Holy Land
- Maronite Catholic Patriarchal Exarchate of Jerusalem and Palestine
- Armenian Catholic Patriarchal Exarchate of Jerusalem and Amman
- Syriac Catholic Patriarchal Exarchate of Jerusalem
- See also: Chaldean Catholic Territory Dependent on the Patriarch of Jerusalem

=== Particular jurisdictions ===
- The Franciscan Custody of the Holy Land has care of most of the Christian holy sites and shrines under the jurisdiction of the Catholic Church.
- The Territorial Prelature of the Notre Dame Center of Jerusalem is considered an Ecumenical Holy Place and pilgrim hostel, under the direct jurisdiction of the Holy See, but in the care of the Legion of Christ since November 2004.
- The Personal prelature of Opus Dei has a small regional vicariate in Jerusalem. Its members are under the jurisdiction of the prelature, though no territory is.

=== Parishes and communities ===
There are currently 103 Catholic parishes in Israel:

- 43 Latin
- 43 Greek Melkite
- 14 Maronite
- 2 Syrian
- 1 Armenian

There are additionally 8 language chaplaincies and 7 ethnic pastoral centers within the Latin Patriarchate:

- 4 Hebrew-speaking
- 2 German-speaking
- 1 English-speaking
- 1 French-speaking
- 2 Russian communities
- 1 African community
- 1 Polish community
- 1 Romanian community

== Representatives of the Holy See ==
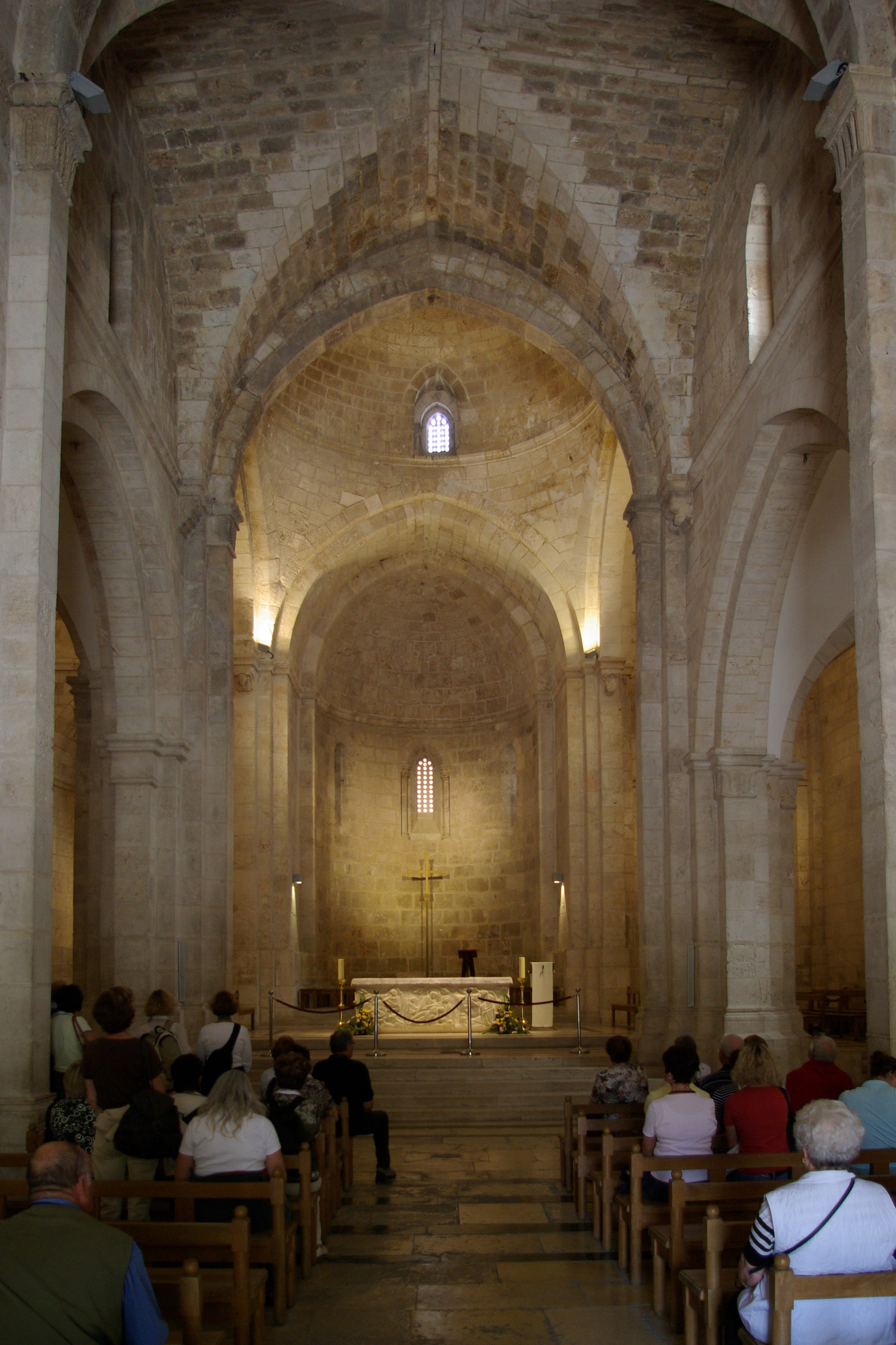
Sanctuary of St Anne's Church, Jerusalem

The Holy See is currently represented by an Apostolic Nuncio to Israel and an Apostolic Delegate in Jerusalem and Palestine. Since 1994, the same person serves in both offices, and also serves as Nuncio to Cyprus. Since 3 June 2021, Adolfo Tito Yllana has served in both offices.

In June 1762, a diplomatic relationship was established in Ottoman Syria, which also included the region of Palestine.

In March 1929, the diplomatic brief for British Palestine was attached to the Delegate to Cairo.

On 11 February 1948, with the Papal brief Supreme Pastoris, Pope Pius XII erected the Apostolic Delegation in Jerusalem and Palestine, Transjordan and Cyprus.

On 30 December 1993, the Holy See and the State of Israel signed the Fundamental Agreement Between the Holy See and the State of Israel, the first agreement between the two States, and they formally established diplomatic relations in March 1994. The Holy See established the Apostolic Nuncio to Israel.

== Supra-diocesan structures ==
=== Episcopal conferences ===
The Assembly of the Catholic Ordinaries of the Holy Land was established in 1992 at the initiative of the Apostolic Delegate in Jerusalem to foster unity within the Catholic Churches of the Holy Land.

The regional episcopal conference for the Latin bishops is the Conference of the Latin Bishops of the Arab Regions (CELRA), established in 1967.

=== Ecumenical participation ===
The Middle East Council of Churches represents 14 million Christians in the Middle East, covering 14 countries and including representatives from 27 churches or jurisdictions (3 Oriental Orthodox, 4 Eastern Orthodox, 7 Catholic, and 13 Protestant/Evangelical).

The Heads of Churches in Jerusalem is a gathering of the patriarchs and other ordinaries of 13 of the local Christian churches in Jerusalem, including Eastern Orthodox, Oriental Orthodox, Eastern Catholic, Latin Catholic, Anglican, and Lutheran churches.

== Religious institutes ==
In 2020, there were 1,310 members of religious orders and institutes of consecrated life in Israel and the Palestinian territories.

The oldest of these is the Franciscan Custody of the Holy Land, established as a province in 1217.

They are represented by the Committee of the Religious Men of the Holy Land and the Union of Religious Superiors of Women in the Holy Land.

=== Male religious ===
There are 440 male religious, representing the following congregations:

- Assumptionists
- Basilians
- Benedictines Dormition Abbey
- Benedictines Olivetan
- Clerical Society of the Most Holy Trinity at Mirinae
- De La Salle Brothers
- Discalced Carmelites
- Families of the Visitation
- Hospitaller Order of St. John of God
- Institute of the Incarnate Word
- Jesuits
- Lazarists
- Legionaries of Christ
- Little Brothers of Jesus
- Little Brothers of Jesus Caritas
- Little Family of the Annunciation
- Missionaries of Charity Contemplative
- Monks of Bethlehem
- Order of Friars Minor Capuchin
- Order of Preachers
- Order of the Servants of Mary
- Passionists
- Religious of Our Lady of Sion
- Sacred Heart Fathers of Betharram
- Salesians of Don Bosco
- Servants of Charity
- Sons of Divine Providence
- Trappists
- White Fathers

=== Female religious ===
There are 870 female religious, from the following congregations:

=== Other Institutes of Consecrated Life ===
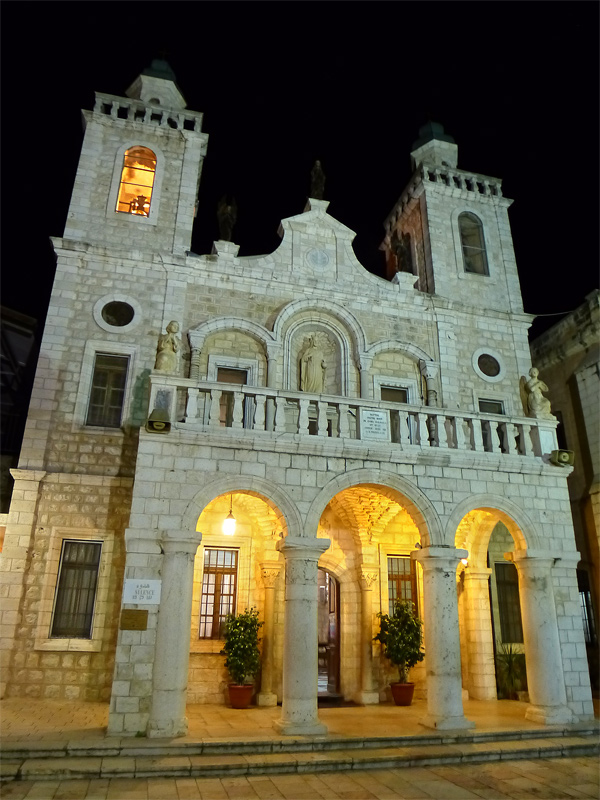
Wedding Church at Cana

There are 145 members of other institutes of consecrated life:

- Association Fraternelle Internationale
- Bose Monastic Community
- Chemin Neuf Community
- Comunione e Liberazione
- Community Cancao Nova
- Community Obra de Maria
- Community of Sant'Egidio
- Community of the Beatitudes
- Emmanuel Community
- Focolare
- Koinonia John the Baptist Community
- Neocatechumenal Way
- Regnum Christi
- Sermig Brotherhood of Hope
- Shalom Catholic Community

== Lay organizations and institutes ==
=== Catholic scouting and youth ministry ===
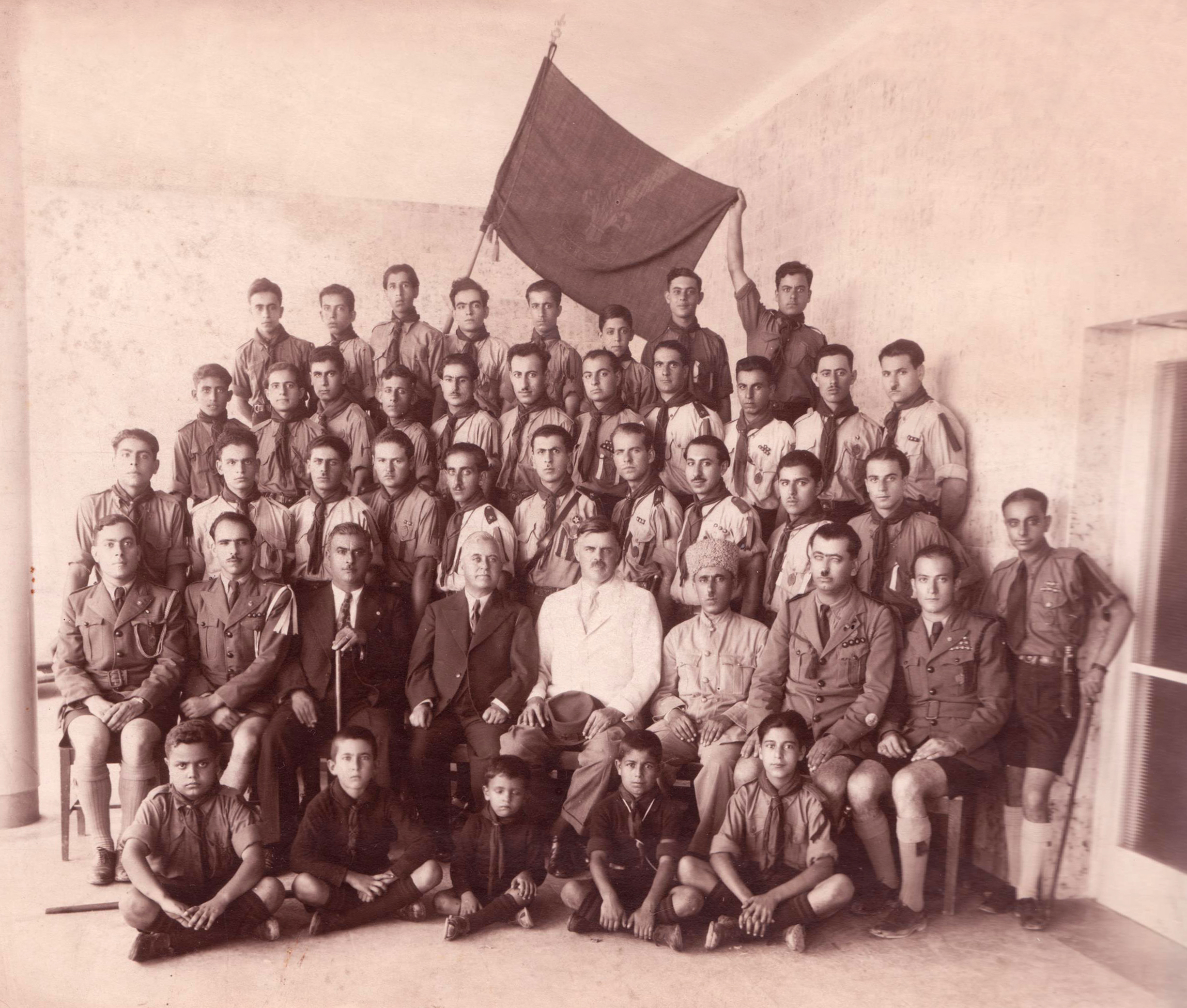
Haifa Maronite Boy Scouts, 1939. Center: Dr John Macqueen Chief Medical Officer for Haifa

- 2,500 members in 16 troops of the Catholic Scout Association in Israel
- 2,500 members in 12 troops of the Palestinian Catholic Scouts of Saint John the Baptist
- Young Catholic Students (Jeunesse Étudiante Catholique)

=== Lay ecclesial movements ===
- 135 members of the Neocatechumenal Way
- 16 members of Comunione e Liberazione
- members of the personal prelature of Opus Dei

=== Medical and social services ===
There are:

- 9 charitable and humanitarian organizations
- 7 hospitals
- 7 centers for the disabled
- 6 orphanages
- 5 homes for the elderly

=== Military and hospitaller orders ===
- Equestrian Order of the Holy Sepulchre of Jerusalem
- Sovereign Military Order of Malta

=== Universities and educational institutes ===
- Studium Theologicum Jerosolymitanum, Franciscan Custody of the Holy Land, founded 1866.
- École Biblique, Dominicans, founded 1920.
- Studium Biblicum Franciscanum, Pontifical University Antonianum, Franciscans, founded 1924.
- College of Ancient Near East Studies of the Pontifical Biblical Institute, Jesuits, founded 1927.
- Latin Patriarchal Seminary of Jerusalem, Latin Patriarchate of Jerusalem, founded 1936.
- Casa de Santiago - Instituto Español Bíblico y Arqueológico, Spanish Bishops' Conference and Pontifical University of Salamanca, founded 1955.
- Tantur Ecumenical Institute, University of Notre Dame, founded 1972.
- Bethlehem University, De La Salle Brothers, founded 1973.
- German Institute of Biblical and Theological Studies, Dormition Abbey, Benedictines, founded 1973.
- Bat Kol Institute, Sisters of Sion, founded 1983
- Center for Biblical Formation, Ecce Homo, Sisters of Sion, founded 1984
- Institut Albert Decourtray for Studies in Judaism and Hebrew Literature, École cathédrale de Paris, founded 1991
- Studium Theologicum Galilaeae "Redemptoris Mater", Neocatechumenal Way, founded 2009.
- Polis Institute of Languages and Humanities, Pontifical University of the Holy Cross, Opus Dei, founded 2011.
- Studium Theologicum Salesianum, Salesian Pontifical University, Salesians of Don Bosco, founded 2011.

There are, additionally, 71 primary and secondary schools

== Pilgrimage ==
=== Pilgrimage services ===
- Christian Information Centre, founded 1973.
- Episcopal Commission for Christian Pilgrimages
- Franciscan Pilgrim's Office, founded 2009.
- Latin Patriarchate Pilgrimages

=== Shrines and holy sites in Israel or Palestine ===
- Church of the Resurrection, Jerusalem - Franciscans share custody of Christianity's holiest site along with the Greek Orthodox, Armenian Apostolic, Coptic Orthodox, Ethiopian Orthodox, and Syriac Orthodox Churches.
- Bethphage, Jerusalem, Franciscans
- Cenacle, Jerusalem, Franciscans
- Dominus Flevit, Jerusalem, Franciscans
- Dormition Abbey, Jerusalem, Benedictines
- Flagellation Church, Jerusalem, Franciscans
- Garden of Gethsemane, Jerusalem, Franciscans
- Pater Noster Church, Jerusalem, Carmelite Nuns
- St. Anne Church, Jerusalem, Missionaries of Africa
- St. Peter in Gallicantu, Jerusalem, Assumptionists
- St. Stephen Church, Jerusalem, Dominicans
- Via Dolorosa 3rd Station, Jerusalem, Armenian Catholics
- Via Dolorosa 4th Station, Jerusalem, Armenian Catholics
- Via Dolorosa 5th Station, Jerusalem, Franciscans
- Via Dolorosa 6th Station, Jerusalem, Little Sisters of Jesus
- Via Dolorosa 7th Station, Jerusalem, Franciscans
- Emmaus of the Crusaders, Abu Gosh, Benedictines
- Shepherd's Field, Beit Sahour, Franciscans
- St. Lazarus, Bethany, Franciscans
- Church of the Nativity, Bethlehem, Franciscans
- Milk Grotto, Bethlehem, Franciscans
- First Miracle Church, Cana, Franciscans
- House of Peter, Capernaum, Franciscans
- Church of the Visitation, Ein Karem, Franciscans
- St. John in the Desert, Ein Karem, Franciscans
- Stella Maris, Haifa, Carmelites
- Baptism of Our Lord, Jordan River, Franciscans
- Emmaus Nicoplis, Latrun, Betharram/Beatitudes
- Duc in Altum, Migdal, Legion of Christ
- Sermon on the Mount, Mount of Beatitudes, Franciscan Sisters of IHM
- Sacrifice of Elijah, Muhraqa, Carmelites
- Church of the Annunciation, Nazareth, Franciscans
- Church of St. Joseph, Nazareth, Franciscans
- Synagogue Church, Nazareth, Greek Melkite Catholics
- Emmaus Qubeibeh, Qubeibeh, Franciscans
- Church of Nicodemus, Ramleh, Franciscans
- Multiplication of the Loaves, Tabgha, Benedictines
- Primacy of Peter, Tabgha, Franciscans
- Transfiguration, Mount Tabor, Franciscans
- House of Parables, Taybeh,
- Church of St. Peter, Tiberias, Koinonia Giovanni Battista

=== Pilgrimage centers in Jerusalem ===
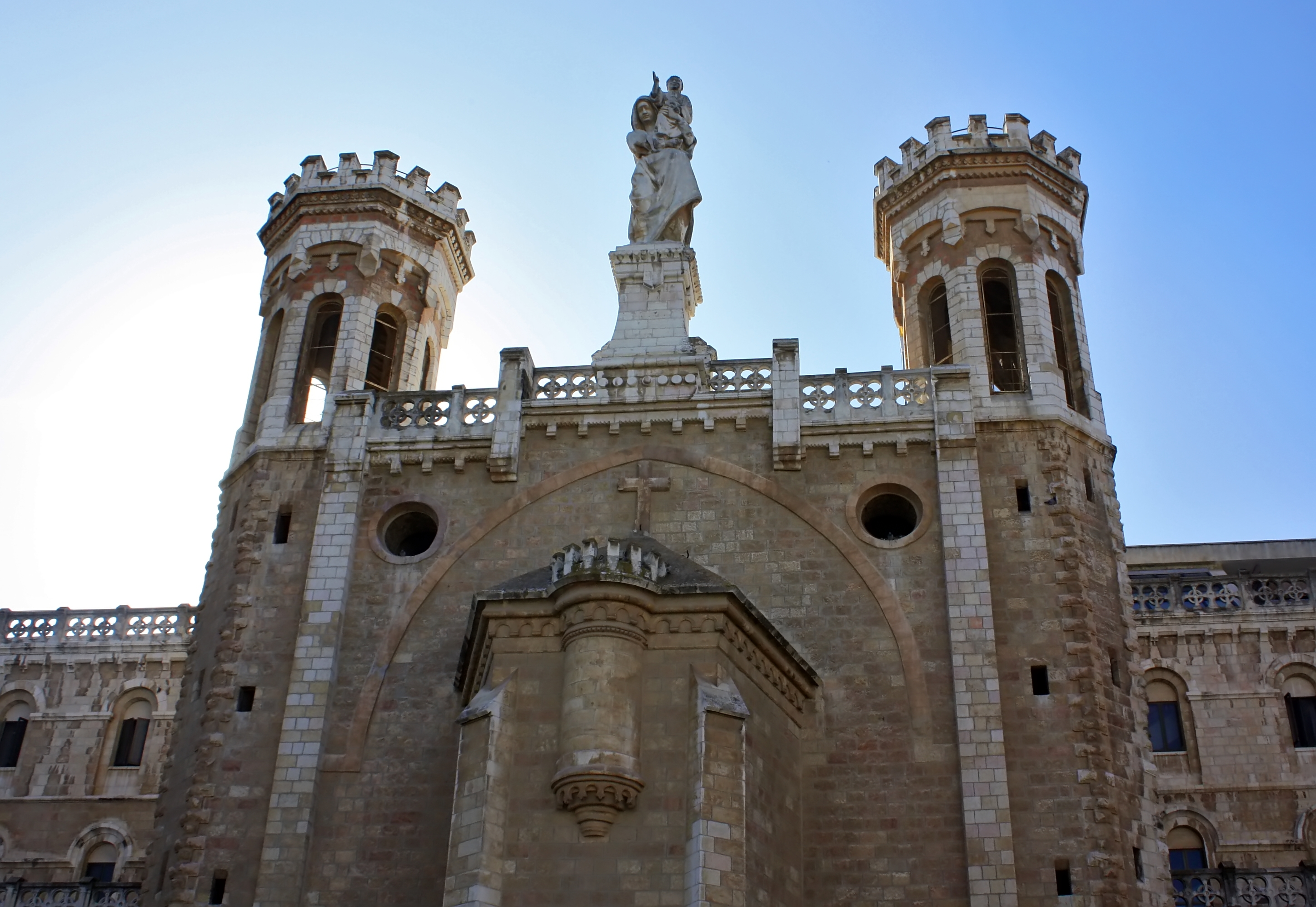
Notre Dame of Jerusalem Center

- Armenian Guest House
- Austrian Hospice of the Holy Family
- Dom Polski (Musrara)
- Dom Polski (Old City)
- Ecce Homo, Sisters of Sion
- Franciscan Missionaries of Mary
- Knight's Palace
- Maison d'Abraham
- Notre Dame of Jerusalem Center
- Paulus-Haus
- Rosary Sisters (Mamila)
- Rosary Sisters (Old City)
- Saint Charles German Hospice
- Saint Maroun Guesthouse
- Saint Thomas Center
- Tantur Ecumenical Institute

=== Pilgrim's decorations ===
- Pilgrim's Shell, Equestrian Order of the Holy Sepulchre
- Jerusalem Pilgrim's Cross, Franciscan Custody of the Holy Land

== Popes, saints, martyrs ==
=== Saints and Martyrs ===
- Mary of Nazareth, Theotokos
- Mary Magdalene, Apostle to the Apostles
- Andrew, Apostle
- Bartholomew, Apostle
- Matthew, Apostle
- Jude/Thaddeus, Apostle
- Simon the Canaanite, Apostle
- James the Greater, Apostle, c.44
- James the Less, Apostle, c.62
- Thomas, Apostle, c.72
- Philip, Apostle, c.80
- John, Apostle, c.100
- James the Just, first Bishop of Jerusalem, c.69
- Simeon of Jerusalem, bishop, c.107
- Matthias of Jerusalem, bishop, c.120
- Narcissus of Jerusalem, bishop, c.216
- Alexander of Jerusalem. bishop, c.251
- Zamudas of Jerusalem, bishop, c.301
- Macarius of Jerusalem, bishop, c.333
- Maximus of Jerusalem, bishop, c.350
- Cyril of Jerusalem, bishop, c.383
- Elias of Jerusalem, patriarch, c.518
- Zosimas of Palestine, monk, c.560 (Feast: 4 April)
- Sophronius of Jerusalem, patriarch, d.638

==== Unnamed martyrs ====
- 33 Martyrs, c.70 (Feast: 16 August)
- Monks slain by Arab invaders, c.410 (Feast: 28 May)
- Hermits slain by Saracen invaders, c.509 (Feast: 19 February)
- 1500 Martyrs of Samaria, c.614 (Feast: 22 June)
- 44 hermits of St. Sabbas Monastery, c.614 (Feast: 16 May)

=== Popes ===
The Popes who were born in, or first ministered in, the Holy Land:

- Saint Peter the Apostle, c.64
- Pope Evaristus, c.99-107
- Pope Theodore I, 642-649
- Pope Urban IV, 1261-1264

== See also ==
- Religion in Israel
- Christianity in Israel
- Catholic Church in Palestine
- Catholic Church in the Middle East
- Latin Patriarchate of Jerusalem
- List of parishes of the Latin Patriarchate of Jerusalem
- List of Catholic titular sees
  - Arad (see)
- Our Lady of Palestine
- Custody of the Holy Land
- Latin Church in the Middle East
- Redemptoris nostri cruciatus
