= List of 3rd-century religious leaders =

This is a list of the top-level leaders for religious groups with at least 50,000 adherents, and that led anytime from January 1, 201, to December 31, 300. It should likewise only name leaders listed on other articles and lists.

== Christianity ==
=== Chalcedonian Christianity ===
- Church of Rome (complete list) –

- Zephyrinus, Bishop of Rome (199–217)
- Callixtus I, Bishop of Rome (217–222)
  - Hippolytus, Antipope (217–235)
- Urban I, Bishop of Rome (222–230)
- Pontian, Bishop of Rome (230–235)
- Anterus, Bishop of Rome (235–236)
- Fabian, Bishop of Rome (236–250)
- Cornelius, Bishop of Rome (251–253)
  - Novatian, Antipope (251–258) (founder of Novatianism)
- Lucius I, Bishop of Rome (253–254)
- Stephen I, Bishop of Rome (254–257)
- Sixtus II, Bishop of Rome (257–258)
- Dionysius, Bishop of Rome (259–268)
- Felix I, Bishop of Rome (269–274)
- Eutychian, Bishop of Rome (275–283)
- Caius, Bishop of Rome (283–296)
- Marcellinus, Bishop of Rome (296–304)

- Church of Constantinople (complete list) –

- Marcus I, Bishop of Byzantium (198–211)
- Philadelphus, Bishop of Byzantium (211–217)
- Cyriacus I, Bishop of Byzantium (217–230)
- Castinus, Bishop of Byzantium (230–237)
- Eugenius I, Bishop of Byzantium (237–242)
- Titus, Bishop of Byzantium (242–272)
- Dometius, Bishop of Byzantium (272–284)
- Rufinus I, Bishop of Byzantium (284–293)
- Probus, Bishop of Byzantium (293–306)

- Church of Alexandria (complete list) –

- Demetrius I, Hierarch of Alexandria (189–232)
- Heraclas, Hierarch of Alexandria (232–248)
- Dionysius, Hierarch of Alexandria (248–264)
- Maximus, Hierarch of Alexandria (265–282)
- Theonas, Hierarch of Alexandria (282–300)
- Peter I, Hierarch of Alexandria (300–311)

- Church of Antioch (complete list) –

- Serapion, Bishop of Antioch (190/191–211/212)
- Asclepiades, Bishop of Antioch (211/212–217/218/220)
- Philetus, Bishop of Antioch (217/218/220–230/231)
- Zebinnus, Bishop of Antioch (231–237)
- Babylas, Bishop of Antioch (237–250/251)
- Fabius, Bishop of Antioch (250/251–253/256)
- Demetrius, Bishop of Antioch (253/256–260/261)
- Paul of Samosata, Bishop of Antioch (260/261–268/272)
- Domnus I, Bishop of Antioch (268–273)
- Timaeus, Bishop of Antioch (273–279/280)
- Cyril, Bishop of Antioch (279/280–303)

- Church of Jerusalem (complete list) –

- Narcissus, Bishop of Aelia Capitolina (185–???; deposed then restored, died in 216)
- Dius, Bishop of Aelia Capitolina
- Germanion, Bishop of Aelia Capitolina
- Gordius, Bishop of Aelia Capitolina (to 211)
- Alexander, Bishop of Aelia Capitolina (231–249)
- Mazabanis, Bishop of Aelia Capitolina (249–260)
- Imeneus, Bishop of Aelia Capitolina (260–276)
- Zamudas, Bishop of Aelia Capitolina (276–283)
- Ermon, Bishop of Aelia Capitolina (283–314)

== Judaism ==
=== Rabbinic Judaism ===
- Nasi of the Sanhedrin

- Judah, Nasi (165–220)
- Gamaliel III, Nasi (220–230)
- Judah II, Nasi (230–270)
- Gamaliel IV, Nasi (270–c.290)
- Judah III, Nasi (c.290–320)

- Exilarch

- Huna Kamma, Exilarch (c. 200)
- Mar Ukva, Exilarch (c. 226)
- Rav Huna, Exilarch (to 297)

== See also ==
- Religious leaders by year
- List of state leaders in the 3rd century
- Lists of colonial governors century
