= List of 4th-century religious leaders =

This is a list of the top-level leaders for religious groups with at least 50,000 adherents, and that led anytime from January 1, 301, to December 31, 400. It should likewise only name leaders listed on other articles and lists.

== Christianity ==
=== Chalcedonian Christianity ===
- Church of Rome (complete list) –

- Marcellinus, Pope (296–304)
- Marcellus I, Pope (308–309)
- Eusebius, Pope (309–310)
- Miltiades, Pope (311–314)
- Sylvester I, Pope (314–335)
- Mark, Pope (336)
- Julius I, Pope (337–352)
- Liberius, Pope (352–366)

- Felix II, Antipope (355–365)

- Damasus, Pope (366–384)

- Ursinus, Antipope (366–367)

- Siricius, Pope (384-399)
- Anastasius I, Pope (399–401)

- Church of Constantinople (complete list) –

- Probus, Bishop of Byzantium (293–306)
- Metrophanes, Bishop of Byzantium (306–314)
- Alexander, Bishop of Byzantium (314–337)
- Paul I ("the Confessor"), Archbishop of Constantinople (337–339, 341–342, 346–350)
- Eusebius of Nicomedia, Archbishop of Constantinople (339–341)
- Macedonius I, Archbishop of Constantinople (342–346, 351–360)
- Eudoxius of Antioch, Archbishop of Constantinople (360–370)
  - Florentius, Archbishop of Constantinople (c. 363) (Anomoean rival to Eudoxius)
- Demophilus, Archbishop of Constantinople (370–380)
- Evagrius, Archbishop of Constantinople (370 or 379)
- Maximus I, Archbishop of Constantinople (380)
- Gregory of Nazianzus, Archbishop of Constantinople (380–381)
- Nectarius, Archbishop of Constantinople (381–397)
- John Chrysostom, Archbishop of Constantinople (398–404)

- Church of Alexandria (complete list) –

- Peter I, Hierarch of Alexandria (300–311)
- Achillas, Hierarch of Alexandria (312–313)
- Athanasius I, Patriarch of Alexandria (328–339, 346–373)
  - Gregory of Cappadocia (339–346), Arian Patriarch; not accepted by the adherents of the Nicene creed (and thus not counted by Coptic Orthodox, Byzantine Orthodox or Catholic lineages)
- Peter II (373–380)
  - Lucius of Alexandria (373–377), an Arian installed by Emperor Valentinian I and not recognized by the adherents of the Nicene Creed
- Timothy I, Patriarch of Alexandria (380–385)
- Theophilus I, Patriarch of Alexandria (385–412)

- Church of Antioch (complete list) –

- Cyril, Bishop (279/280–303)
- Tyrannion, Bishop (304–314)
- Vitalis, Bishop (314–320)
- Philogonius, Bishop (320–324)
- Eustathius, Patriarch (324–330)
- Paulinus, Patriarch (331–332)
- Eulalius, Patriarch (330)
- Euphronius, Patriarch (332–333)
- Flacillus, Patriarch (333/4–342)
- Stephen I, Patriarch (342–344)
- Leontius, Patriarch (344–357/8)
- Eudoxius, Patriarch (358–359)
- Annanius, Patriarch (359)
- Meletius (360–381)
  - Euzoius, Patriarch (360/1–376) (Arian claimant)
  - Vitalis, Patriarch (375) (Apollinarist claimant)
  - Dorotheus, Patriarch (376–381) (Arian claimant)
  - Paulinus II, Patriarch (362–388) (Nicene claimant)
- Flavian I, Patriarch (381–404)
  - Evagrius, Patriarch (388–392/393) (Nicene claimant)

- Church of Jerusalem (complete list) –

- Ermon, Bishop of Jerusalem (Aelia Capitolina) (283–314)
- Macarius I, Bishop of Jerusalem (Aelia Capitolina) (314–333)
- Maximus III, Bishop of Jerusalem (333–348)
- Cyril I, Bishop of Jerusalem (350–386)
- John II, Bishop of Jerusalem (386–417)

== Judaism ==
=== Rabbinic Judaism ===
- Nasi of the Sanhedrin

- Judah III, Nasi (c.290–320)
- Hillel II, Nasi (320–365)
- Gamaliel V, Nasi (365–385)
- Judah IV, Nasi (385–400)

- Exilarch

- Nehemiah, Exilarch (in 313)
- Ukban ben Nehmiah, Exilarch (c. 400?)
- Nathan Ukban II, Exilarch (370 to about 400?)
- Huna bar Nathan

== See also ==
- Religious leaders by year
- List of state leaders in the 4th century
- Lists of colonial governors century
