= List of parishes of the Latin Patriarchate of Jerusalem =

The Latin Patriarchate of Jerusalem is an exempt diocese of the Roman Catholic Church. The patriarchate contains 64 parishes. The Patriarchate embraces territorial Israel (without territorial expansion after 1967), Jordan, the Palestinian territories, the Israeli administered territories in the West Bank, and Cyprus. (The Golan is not part of the patriarchate.)

== Distribution of parishes by areas ==
In 2010, the Patriarchate served 64 parishes with 78,000 Catholics and 85 diocesan priests. These were classified according to four areas of the diocese. These are in alphabetical order:

1. Israel (excluding Jerusalem), for which an episcopal vicar in Nazareth is ordered.
2. Jerusalem and the Palestinian territories, directly under the jurisdiction of the Patriarch.
3. Jordan, for which an episcopal vicar in Amman is appointed.
4. Cyprus, for which an episcopal vicar in Nicosia is ordered.

Since 2010, several parishes have been added and by 2023 there were over 70 across the four areas.

The parish places and chaplaincies follow the instructions of the Latin Patriarchate.

== Parishes and chaplaincies with church buildings and chapels (2010) ==
Location	Devotion	Image	Name	Notes	Country
Jerusalem	Name of Jesus		Co-Cathedral of the Most Holy Name of Jesus	The 1872 finished Concathedral is part of the building complex of the Latin Patriarchate in the Old City.	Jerusalem and Palest. Autonomy
Jerusalem	Salvator		Salvator Church	With black spire, the right of the turrets and gables of the Co-Cathedral of Jesus' name. The Salvator Church is located in the San Salvatore complex in the Christian Quarter of the Old City.	Jerusalem and Palest. Autonomy
Beit Hanina	Apostle James Zebedee		St. James's Church	Bait Hanina (بيت حنينا, בית חנינא) is the parish of St. Salvator chaplaincy.	Jerusalem and Palest. Autonomy
Jerusalem	Salvator		Chapel of the Terra Sancta College	Chaplaincy of the parish of St. Salvator.	Jerusalem and Palest. Autonomy
Acre	John the Baptist		St. John's Baptist Church		Israel (excluding Jerusalem)
Beersheba	Patriarch Abraham		St. Abraham Church	There is also a Hebrew-speaking community at St. Abraham.	Israel (excluding Jerusalem)
Kafr Kanna	First miracle of Jesus		Wedding Latin Church	Built in 1880.	Israel (excluding Jerusalem)
Eilat	St. Moses and St. Elijah Parish		Trinity Church		Israel (excluding Jerusalem)
Haifa	Joseph of Nazareth		St. Joseph's Church		Israel (excluding Jerusalem)
Yafa an-Naseriyye	Apostle John Zebedee		St. John the Apostle Church	The Nazarene Jafa (يافة الناصره) is called in Hebrew Jafi'a (יָפִיעַ).	Israel (excluding Jerusalem)
Mateh Yehuda	Our Lady Mary of Palestine		Monastery of Our Lady Mary of Palestine	The church is a part of Deir Rafat Monastery.	Israel (excluding Jerusalem)
Nazareth	Annunciation by Archangel Gabriel		Annunciation Church	Archaeological excavations and construction 1955-1969, 23 Consecration März in 1969.	Israel (excluding Jerusalem)
Rameh	Anthony the Great		St. Anthony's Church		Israel (excluding Jerusalem)
Ramleh	Nicodemus and Joseph of Arimathea		St. Nicodemus and Joseph's Church	A chaplaincy is to Lod	Israel (excluding Jerusalem)
Reineh	Joseph the Worker		Church of St. Joseph the Worker		Israel (excluding Jerusalem)
Shefa-'Amr	Joseph of Nazareth		St. Joseph's Church		Israel (excluding Jerusalem)
Tel Aviv	Anthony of Padua		St. Anthony's Church	The Gothic church is located in Ajami neighborhood, south of Jaffa.	Israel (excluding Jerusalem)
Tel Aviv	Simon Peter		St. Peter's Church	In addition to the Franciscans, the Hebrew-speaking community uses the St. Peter's Church. The church, built in 1654 is located in the Jaffa district near the lake shore.	Israel (excluding Jerusalem)
Tiberias	Simon Peter	zentriert	Latin Convention (Terra Sancta) with statue of Simon Peter.		Israel (excluding Jerusalem)
Abud	Sorrowful Mother		Church of Our Lady Mary of the Seven Sorrows		Jerusalem and Palest. Autonomy
Ain Arik	Annunciation		Church of the Annunciation	The church in Ain Arik (عين عريك) is run from Jerusalem.	Jerusalem and Palest. Autonomy
Beit Jala	Annunciation		Church of the Annunciation		Jerusalem and Palest. Autonomy
Beit Sahour	Our Lady of Fatima		Our Lady's Church		Jerusalem and Palest. Autonomy
Bethlehem	Catherine of Alexandria		St. Catherine's Church with columns of the monument to Saint Jerome		Jerusalem and Palest. Autonomy
Bir Zait	Immaculate Conception		Church of the Immaculate Conception		Jerusalem and Palest. Autonomy
Jenin	Christ the Redeemer		Redeemer Church	Chaplaincies exist in Birqin, depletion properties Sabah al-Khayr, Deir Ghazaleh, Dschaalameh, Kafr Qud, Muqeibileh and Ya'bad.	Jerusalem and Palest. Autonomy
Dschifna	Joseph of Nazareth		St. Joseph's Church	The place Dschifna (جفنا) is considered the biblical Ophni (עפני, Γοφνα, Gophna; Talmud - בן גופנין, Ben Gufnin).	Jerusalem and Palest. Autonomy
Gaza	Holy Family		Church of the Holy Family		Jerusalem and Palest. Autonomy
Jericho	Good Shepherd		Church of the Good Shepherd	Built in 1924	Jerusalem and Palest. Autonomy
Nablus	Savior at Jacob's well		Church of the Redeemer at Jacob's Well	The parish is of Rafidia with care. A chaplaincy is in Burqa (برقه).	Jerusalem and Palest. Autonomy
Rafidia, Nablus	Justin Martyr		St. Justin's Church	The church was built in 1887. Since 1966 Rafidia heard رفيديا to Nablus. Chaplaincies are in Azzun (عزون) and Tulkarm.	Jerusalem and Palest. Autonomy
Ramallah	Holy Family		Church of the Holy Family	Parish founded in 1860. Church built in 1913.	Jerusalem and Palest. Autonomy
Taybeh	Christ the Redeemer		Redeemer Church	Consecrated in 1971. Replacement building for an older church in Taybeh (الطيبة).	Jerusalem and Palest. Autonomy
Zababdeh	Visitation (Christianity)		St. Mary's Visitation Church		Jerusalem and Palest. Autonomy
Vein and Rabbah	Joseph of Nazareth		St. Joseph's Church		Jordan
Ajloun	Paul (Sha'ul) of Tarsus		St St. Paul's Church		Jordan
Amman	Joseph of Nazareth		St. Joseph's Church	The church is located in the district of Amman Dschabel.	Jordan
Amman	Our Lady of Mount Carmel		Our Lady's Church	The parish is located in the district Dschabel Hashimi.	Jordan
Amman	Francis de Sales		St. Francis of Sales Church	The parish is located in the district Dschabel Hussain.	Jordan
Amman	Annunciation		Church of the Annunciation	The parish is located in the district Dschabel Luwaibdeh	Jordan
Amman	Mary Mother of the Church		Church of St. Mary Mother of the Church	The parish is located in Marka (also Hittin or Fast), and in a neighborhood that emerged from a refugee camp for Palestinians.	Jordan
Amman	Christ the King		Christ the King Church	The parish is located in the district Misdar	Jordan
Amman	Mary of Nazareth		Latin Convention	Sermon site is in Latin Convention in Sweifieh area.	Jordan
Amman	Sacred Heart of Jesus		Sacred Heart Church	The parish is in the Tilaa-el-Ali district.	Jordan
Amman	St Paul the Apostle		St Paul's Church	located in Umm Zuwaytina district.	Jordan
Amman	Sacred Heart of Jesus		Jesuit Centre	The parish is in English and meets at the Jesuit Center	Jordan
Anjara	Visitation		Our Lady's Church	Andschara is in the district of Ajloun. A chaplaincy is to Kufrindschi.	Jordan
Aqaba	Prophet Elias		Elias Church		Jordan
Fuheis	Immaculate Heart of Mary		St. Mary's Church	Fuhays is the only predominantly Christian inhabited site in Jordan, with about 4,000 Catholics among the 13,000 inhabitants.	Jordan
Fuheis Al-Alali	Our Lady Mary of Mercy		Latin Convention	Sermon site is in Latin Convention in Balad.	Jordan
Husn	Immaculate Conception		Church of the Immaculate Conception	Al Husn, near Irbid (الحصن), was Ulrich Jasper Seetzen of described in 1806 stayed there.	Jordan
Irbid	Saint George		St. George's Church	A chaplaincy is to Aydun	Jordan
Karak	Our Lady Mary of the Rosary		Our Lady's Church		Jordan
Madaba	Beheading of John the Baptist		Church of St. John the Baptist Beheading		Jordan
Mafraq	Joseph of Nazareth		St. Joseph's Church		Jordan
Ma'an	James the Less		St. James Church	Ma'an writes to معان (d = Maʿān).	Jordan
Marj Al-Hamam	Sacred Heart of Jesus		Latin Convention	Sermon site is in Latin Convention. Marj Al-Hamam (مرج الحمام) is the 27th District of Great Amman	Jordan
Na'our	Sacred Heart of Jesus		Latin Convention	Indicated by the second arrow from the right, on a panoramic photo of Na'ur to in 1965. Sermon site is in Latin Convention. Na'ur (ناعور is now the 26th Large district of Amman.	Jordan
Rumaymin	Holy Cross, Exaltatio Sanctae Crucis		Latin Convention	Sermon site is in Latin Convention. Rumaymin is a district of as-Salt	Jordan
Rusayfeh	Mary Mother of the Church		Church of St. Mary Mother of the Church?		Jordan
Safout	Teresa of the Andes		Latin Convention	Sermon site is in Latin Convention.	Jordan
Salt	Assumption of Mary		St. Mary Assumption Church, top right of the image.	As-Salt (السلط) is the ancient somersaults (Σαλτος) back.	Jordan
Shatana	Annunciation		Latin Convention	Sermon site is in Latin Convention.	Jordan
Smakieh	Archangel Michael		Latin Convention	Sermon site is in Latin Convention.	Jordan
Wahadinah	Prophet Elias		Elias Church	Al-Wahadinah writes to الوهادنه.	Jordan
Zarqa North	Twelve Apostles		Twelve Apostles Church		Jordan
Zarqa South	Pius X		St. Pius Church		Jordan
Larnaca	Our Lady of Mercy		St.Mary's Church	A chaplaincy is in the Franciscan convent in Ayia Napa.	Cyprus
Limassol	Catherine of Alexandria		St. Catherine's Church	Built 1872-1879	Cyprus
Nicosia	Holy Cross		Holy Cross Church with wall to North Nicosia	Built 1900-1902. The church is located in the buffer zone and the main entrance is blocked by the wall. A chaplaincy is in Northern Cyprus Girne / Kyrenia.	Cyprus
Nicosia	Holy Cross		Chapel of the Terra Sancta College	Chaplaincy of the parish of Holy Cross	Cyprus
Paphos	Our Lady Mary Chrysopolis		Church of Our Lady Mary of Üsküdar (Panagia Chrysopolitissa)	Was allegedly tied and whipped in Kato Paphos, here with Paul-pillar, at the Paul. A chaplaincy is in Polis Chrysochous.	Cyprus
Polis Chrysochous	St. Nicholas		St. Nicholas Church	The chaplaincy of Paphos is a guest in the Orthodox Church since 1992.	Cyprus

== See also ==
- Chapel of Our Lady of Sion
