= Lists of religious leaders =

Lists of leaders of major religions in any given century include:

- List of 21st-century religious leaders
- List of 20th-century religious leaders
- List of 19th-century religious leaders
- List of 18th-century religious leaders
- List of 17th-century religious leaders
- List of 16th-century religious leaders
- List of 15th-century religious leaders
- List of 14th-century religious leaders
- List of 13th-century religious leaders
- List of 12th-century religious leaders
- List of 11th-century religious leaders
- List of 10th-century religious leaders
- List of 9th-century religious leaders
- List of 8th-century religious leaders
- List of 7th-century religious leaders
- List of 6th-century religious leaders
- List of 5th-century religious leaders
- List of 4th-century religious leaders
- List of 3rd-century religious leaders

== See also ==
- Lists of popes, patriarchs, primates, archbishops, and bishops
- List of rabbis
- List of founders of religious traditions
- List of Dalai Lama
- Supreme Patriarch of Thailand
