= Joseph of Jerusalem =

Joseph of Jerusalem may refer to

- Joseph I of Jerusalem
- Joseph II of Jerusalem
