= John I (bishop of Jerusalem) =

John I of Jerusalem was the seventh Bishop of Jerusalem.

He was, according to Eusebius, a Jewish Christian born to Jewish parents who kept the Law of the Torah. John I replaced the first bishop of Jerusalem Saint James the Just, the "brother of the Lord," who was appointed bishop by the Apostles Peter, James, and John.

John was well versed in the Law of Moses and as a young man disputed with Christians until he converted with the instruction of St. Justus bishop of Jerusalem. He was baptized and ordained a deacon. His two-year episcopacy was one under which the church was persecuted.

John I died April 11, after serving two years in office.
