= Maximus II of Jerusalem =

2nd-century bishop of Jerusalem

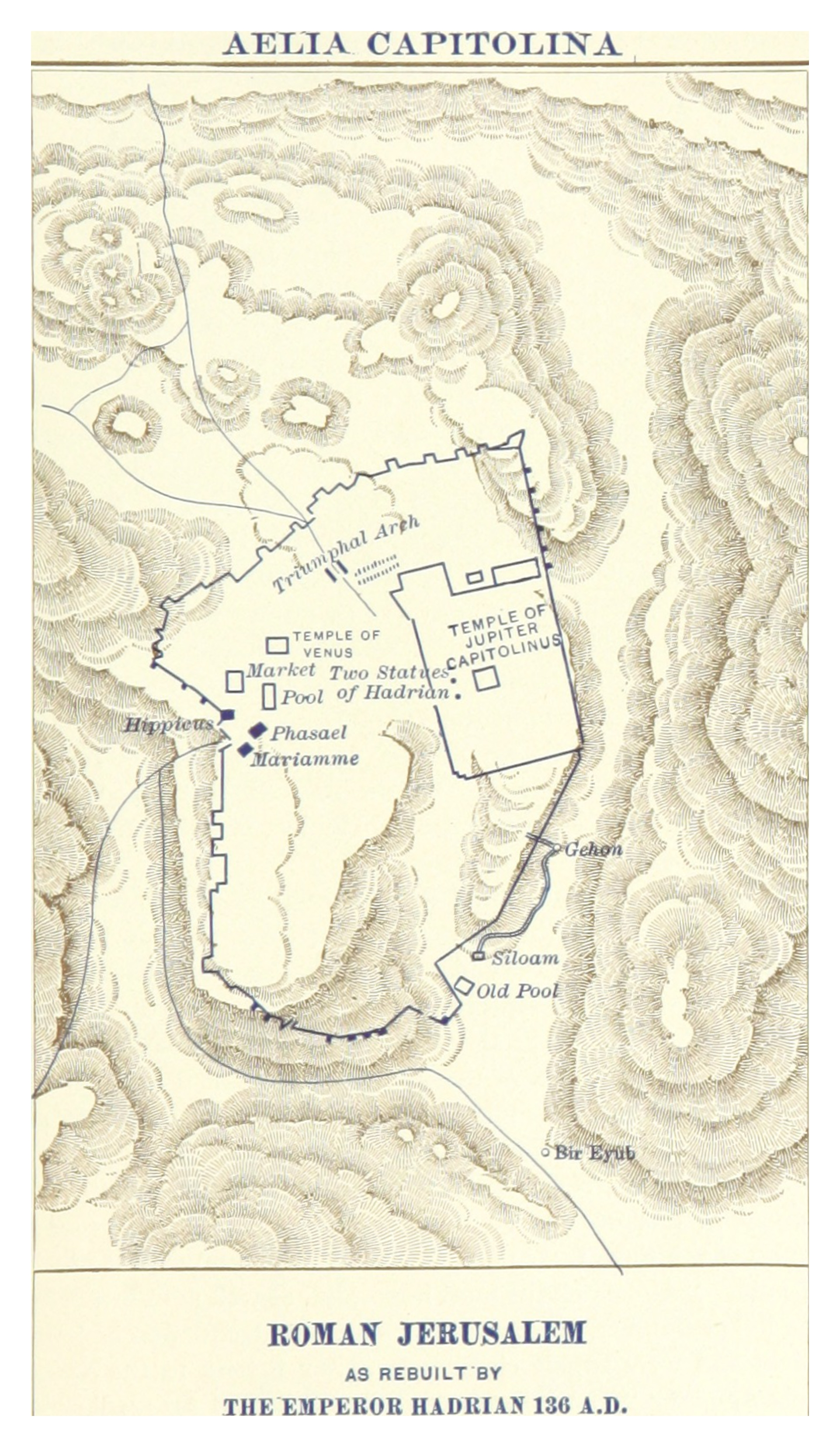
Map of Jerusalem (Aelia Capitolina) in Maximus III's time

Maximus II (fl. AD 185–196) was an early Christian bishop of Jerusalem (Aelia Capitolina) and theologian.

In Jerome's De viris illustribus, he writes that Maximus lived during the reigns of Commodus and Septimius Severus (i.e. late 2nd century), and that he wrote on the topic of the origin of evil and "whether matter is made by God."

He is not to be confused with the early bishop Maximus I (bishop c. AD 170) or the later Maximus III (bishop 333–347, a saint).

Preceded by Capion	Bishop of Jerusalem; 185–???	Succeeded by Antoninus
