= St. Joseph's Church, Haifa =

Coordinates: 32.8208°N 34.9933°E

St. Joseph's Church
- כנסיית יוסף הקדוש
- كنيسة مار يوسف للّاتين
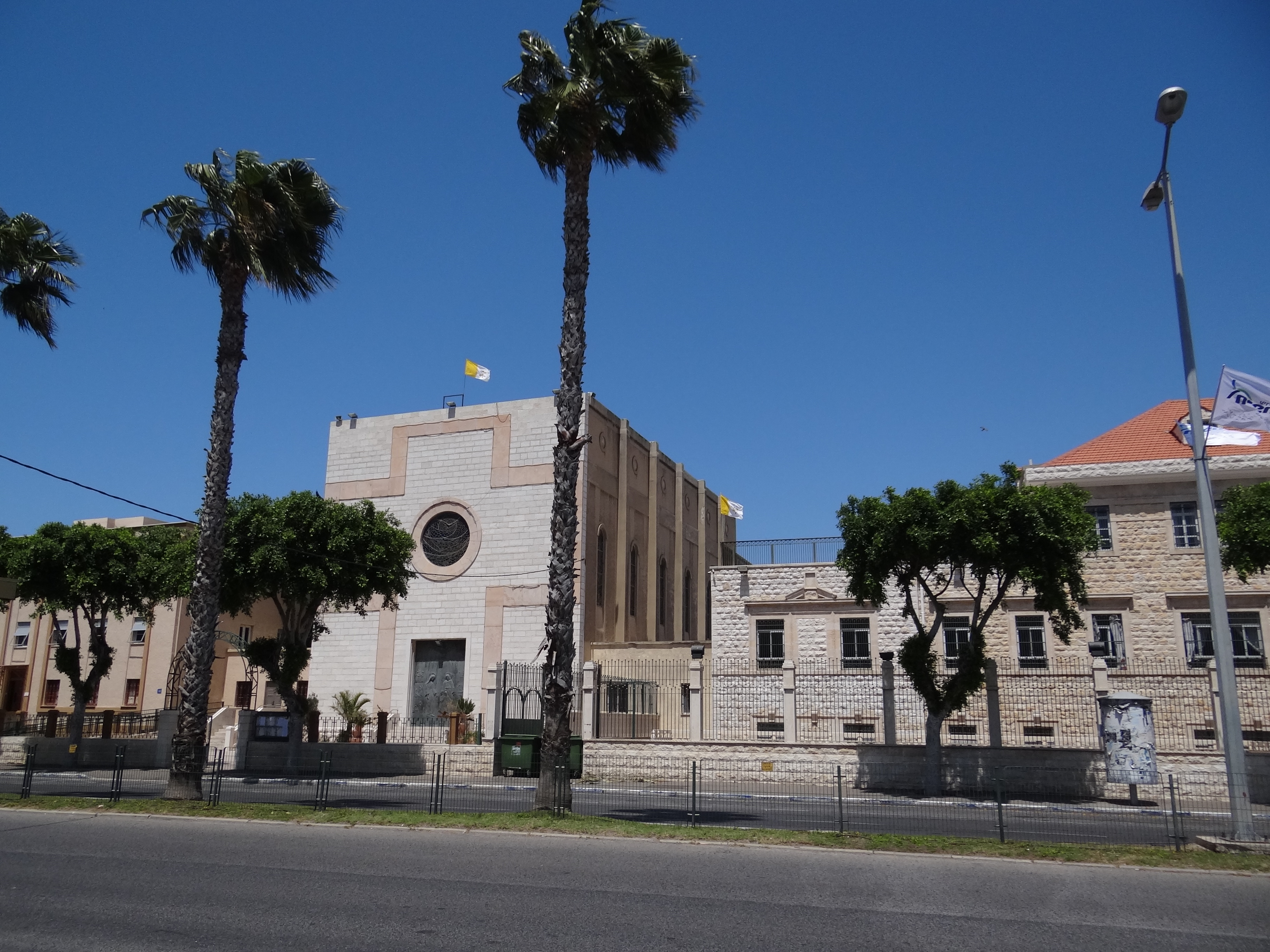
- St. Joseph's Church
- Location: Haifa
- Country: Israel
- Denomination: Roman Catholic Church

St. Joseph Church (Arabic: كنيسة مار يوسف للّاتين, Hebrew: כנסיית יוסף הקדוש Latin: Ecclesia Sancti Josephi) is a Roman Catholic church in the German Colony of Haifa, Israel. Administered by the Order of Carmelites, it is the main center of worship for the parish of Haifa within the Latin Patriarchate of Jerusalem.

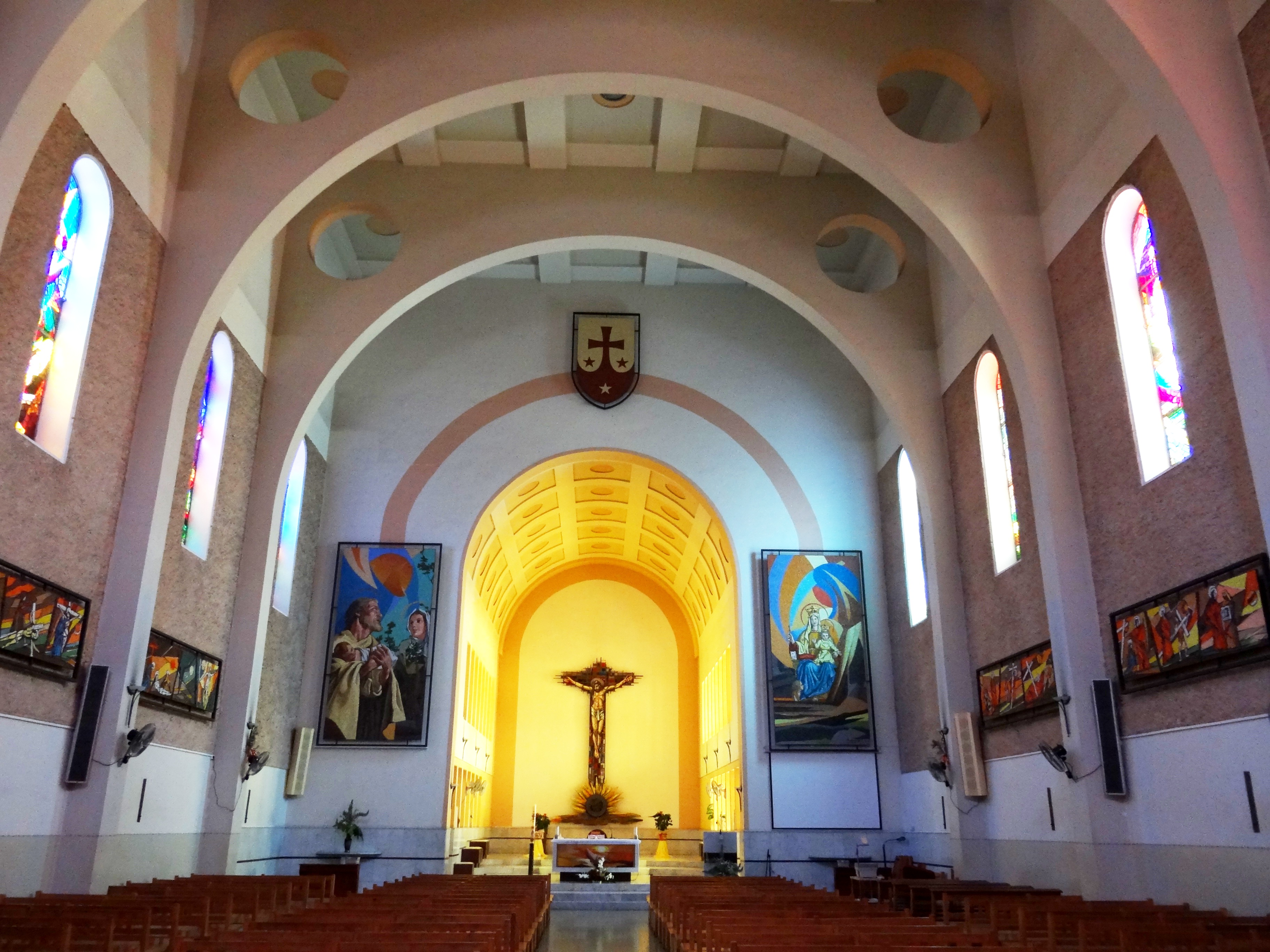
Internal View

The first Latin Catholic church was dedicated to the Prophet Elijah in the Hamra Square. It was inaugurated in 1867 and could accommodate 400 worshipers. The structure was damaged in the 1948 Arab–Israeli War and the Carmelite friars relocated to a building of the Salesian school in the city center. In the 1950s the community managed to raise enough money to build a new church, designed by Italian architect Antonio Barluzzi, which was dedicated in 1961, a year after his death. The Church of St. Joseph is the last building designed by Barluzzi in the Holy Land.

== See also ==
- Catholic Church in Israel
