= Benjamin of Jerusalem =

Benjamin I of Jerusalem was the 2nd-century 6th bishop of Jerusalem. According to Eusebius of Caesarea he was a Jewish Christian. His short episcopacy was only from about 116 to 117 AD. He was possibly killed in the persecution of Hadrian (117–138), His Feast Day was December 11.
