= Creed of Jerusalem =

Christian baptismal formula (c. 350 CE)

The Creed of Jerusalem is a baptismal formula used by early Christians to confess their faith. Some authors (like Philip Schaff) believed that it was one of the sources of the Nicene-Constantinopolitan Creed, drawn up at the First Council of Constantinople in 381 and date it to 350 AD.

In the original form, given by Cyril of Jerusalem, it says:

I believe in the Father, and in the Son, and in the Holy Ghost, and in one Baptism of repentance.

— Catechetical Lecture 19, Cyril of Jerusalem
