= Tobias of Jerusalem =

Bishop of Jerusalem

Tobias of Jerusalem was the fifth Bishop of Jerusalem, who lived in the 2nd century. He was acquainted with Addai of Edessa (also known as Thaddeus of Edessa), one of the seventy disciples and a miraculous healer.

According to Eusebius, Tobias was a Jewish Christian born to Jewish parents.

His feast day is on 17 December. A joint feast of the early Bishops of Jerusalem is commemorated on 17 May in the Catholic Church.

== See also ==
- Greek Orthodox Patriarch of Jerusalem
- Latin Patriarchate of Jerusalem
