= Chaldean Catholic Territory of Jerusalem =

Eastern Catholic missionary jurisdiction in Israel

Patriarchal Exarchate of Jerusalem (Chaldeaan)

Location
- Country: Israel

Information
- Denomination: Chaldean Catholic Church
- Rite: East Syriac Rite
- Established: 1997

Current leadership
- Pope: Leo XIV
- Patriarch: Louis Raphael I Sako
- Patriarchal Exarch: Sede vacante

The Chaldean Catholic Territory Dependent on (or Patriarchal Dependency of) the Patriarch of Jerusalem is a missionary pre-diocesan jurisdiction of the Chaldean Catholic Church sui iuris (Eastern Catholic: Chaldean Rite, Syriac language) covering the Holy Land (Palestine and Israel).

== Patriarchal Vicars of Jerusalem ==
Patriarchal Vicars/exarch of Jerusalem

- Msgr. Paul Collin (1990 – 1991), next Patriarchal Exarch of Jerusalem of the Chaldeans (1990 – ?)

== See also ==
- Catholic Church in Israel
- Chaldean Catholic Church
