= Zacchaeus of Jerusalem =

Catholic and Orthodox saint

Saint Zacchaeus of Jerusalem

Bishop of Jerusalem
- Died: c. 116
- Venerated in: Catholic Church; Eastern Orthodox Church; Oriental Orthodoxy; Church of the East
- Feast: 23 August

Zacchaeus of Jerusalem, also known as Zacharias, (died 116 AD) was a 2nd-century Christian saint venerated by the Roman Catholic and Eastern Orthodox churches. He was the fourth Bishop of Jerusalem. His feast day is August 23.

According to Eusebius, he was a Jewish Christian. Little is known about his life, although he is recognized as a saint. His episcopacy was about the years 112 to 116, when he probably died.
