= Senecas of Jerusalem =

Bishop of Jerusalem

Senecas of Jerusalem was a 2nd century Jewish Christian bishop of Jerusalem.

According to Eusebius of Caesarea, there were thirteen bishops of Jerusalem between the fall of the Second Temple and the Bar Kokhba revolt. All were Jewish Christians and he was 10th on that list. He is also mentioned in the Epistle of James to Quadratus.

Some scholars have suggested that he was not a bishop but rather a presbyter assisting James the first Bishop, though this is controversial.
