= Ephram of Jerusalem =

Ephram of Jerusalem was a 2nd-century Jewish Christian bishop of Jerusalem.

According to the church Historian Eusebius of Caesarea, there were fifteen bishops of Jerusalem, all Jewish Christians, who ruled the church in Jerusalem until Bar Kokhba's revolt, and he was 13th on that list. Exact dates are not given by Eusebius for his bishopric but it was between 124 and 135 AD.
