= Dolichianus of Jerusalem =

Bishop of Jerusalem in early Christianity

Dolichianus of Jerusalem was Bishop of Jerusalem in early Christianity. He served during the rule of Commodus about 180AD.
