= Justus of Jerusalem =

Third "bishop" of Jerusalem, leader of the christian movement

Saint Justus of Jerusalem

Bishop of Jerusalem
- Venerated in: Catholic Church; Eastern Orthodox Church; Oriental Orthodoxy; Church of the East
- Feast: 24 November

Justus I Bishop of Jerusalem, whose Jewish name is Judas, was a 2nd-century Jewish Christian leader and according to most Christian traditions the third Bishop of Jerusalem, whose episcopacy was about 107–113 AD. He succeeded Simeon the son of Clopas who died crucified in 107/108, or in 115-117. He is probably a son of James, brother of Jesus and sometimes identified as the New Testament's "Jude of James", otherwise Jude the Apostle. His successor Zacchea I is also called "the Righteous", since this is the meaning of the Aramaic Zakka.

He is considered a saint and his feast day is 24 November.

== Biographic information ==
Little is known about Justus. He appears in the third position of all the episcopal lists of Jerusalem, succeeding James the Just and Simeon of Clopas, starting with that of Eusebius of Caesarea. He is probably the leader of the city's Nazarene community, or at least of those who survived the massive Romans repressions after the Jewish revolt of 66-74 and its upheavals. Eusebius of Caesarea specifies that he was circumcised, the Nazarene movement considering itself to be a Jewish movement. However, during the last quarter of the first century the rift between the Nazoreans and the Jewish community widened. It was probably at this time that a new draft of the Birkat haMinim was written containing a curse on heretics (minim) among which the Nazoreans are included.

Simon Claude Mimouni believes that it is possible that Justus is the son of James, the “brother” of Jesus. In this case, he would have acceded to the episcopate at an advanced age since he would be "necessarily born before 61/62, date of the execution of his father, which could then explain the short duration of his mandate", in particular if Simeon died under the consulate of Tiberius Claudius Atticus Herodes (103), as Eusebius of Caesarea indicates.

He is called Justus (Latinized form of "the Righteous") in most sources. In one of the episcopal lists, the character nicknamed Justus (the 3rd on the list) is nicknamed Barsabas (see below). He is however designated under the name of Judas by Epiphanius of Salamis who quotes the list of the Apostolic Constitutions (VII, 46, 1). In these, it is reported that Judas (Justus) is the son of James (Apostolic Constitutions VII, 46, 2) quoted two lines previously: that is to say "James, brother of Christ according to the flesh" as stated in Apostolic Constitutions VIII, 35, 1. The pseudonym - or name - Justus (the Righteous) is found very frequently among members of the family of Jesus, who is himself called the Righteous (and not Jesus) by Stephen in his speech as recomposed in the Acts of the Apostles (v. 37), or by Claudia Procula, Pilate's wife at the time of his trial. His name could therefore be Judas, but he is better known by his nickname "the Righteous", which almost becomes a title.

== Justus Barsabee ==
A Georgian homily preserved in a single manuscript (Iviron 11) is presented as a treatise by Barsabeus bishop of Jerusalem. No bishop of this name is attested in the usual lists, and it is certainly a pseudonym relating to "Joseph dit Barsabbas, nicknamed Justus", the unlucky candidate for the succession of the traitor Judas (namely Matthias) in Ac. 1, 23. The editor proposes to compare this pseudepigraph to the Just Bishop of Jerusalem fourth (and not third as in the list of Eusebius) successor of James. It is the author of a letter preserved in Armenian which interprets the "salt" at baptism in the same way as the Georgian homily, in §8. The same name, Just of Jerusalem, Patriarch, reappears in the 6th century in another Armenian letter, this time from a very real author, Grégoire Arzrouni. Eusebius of Caesarea also knows a tradition, undoubtedly drawn from Papias, which delivers at least one apocryphal detail on this quasi-apostle (a story of miraculous healing). The Treatise of Barsabée, on the basis of other traditions on Just 4th successor of Jacques, would depend on a writing going back effectively to the Just Barsabée of the first century, with a view to legitimizing after Chalcedon an episcopal succession in Jerusalem opposed to Juvenal and the patriarchs of this period.
