= Philip of Jerusalem =

Bishop of Jerusalem

Philip Bishop of Jerusalem, was a 2nd-century Jewish Christian leader and Bishop of Jerusalem, whose episcopacy was about 120-124 AD.

According to Eusebius of Caesarea he was a Jewish Christian.

His feast day is Aug 4.
