= Levis of Jerusalem =

Jewish Christian bishop of Jerusalem

Levis of Jerusalem was a 2nd-century Jewish Christian bishop of Jerusalem.

According to the church Historian Eusebius of Caesarea, there were fifteen bishops of Jerusalem, all Jewish Christians, who ruled the church in Jerusalem until Bar Kokhba's revolt, and he was 12th on that list. Exact dates are not given by Eusebius for his bishopric, though it was between 124 and 135 AD.

This bishop is also mentioned in the apocryphal Letter of James to Quadratus. and Epiphanius of Salamis.

Some scholars have suggested that he was not a bishop but rather a presbyter assisting James the first Bishop, though this is controversial.
