= Macarius of Jerusalem =

4th-century bishop of Jerusalem

Saint Macarius of Jerusalem
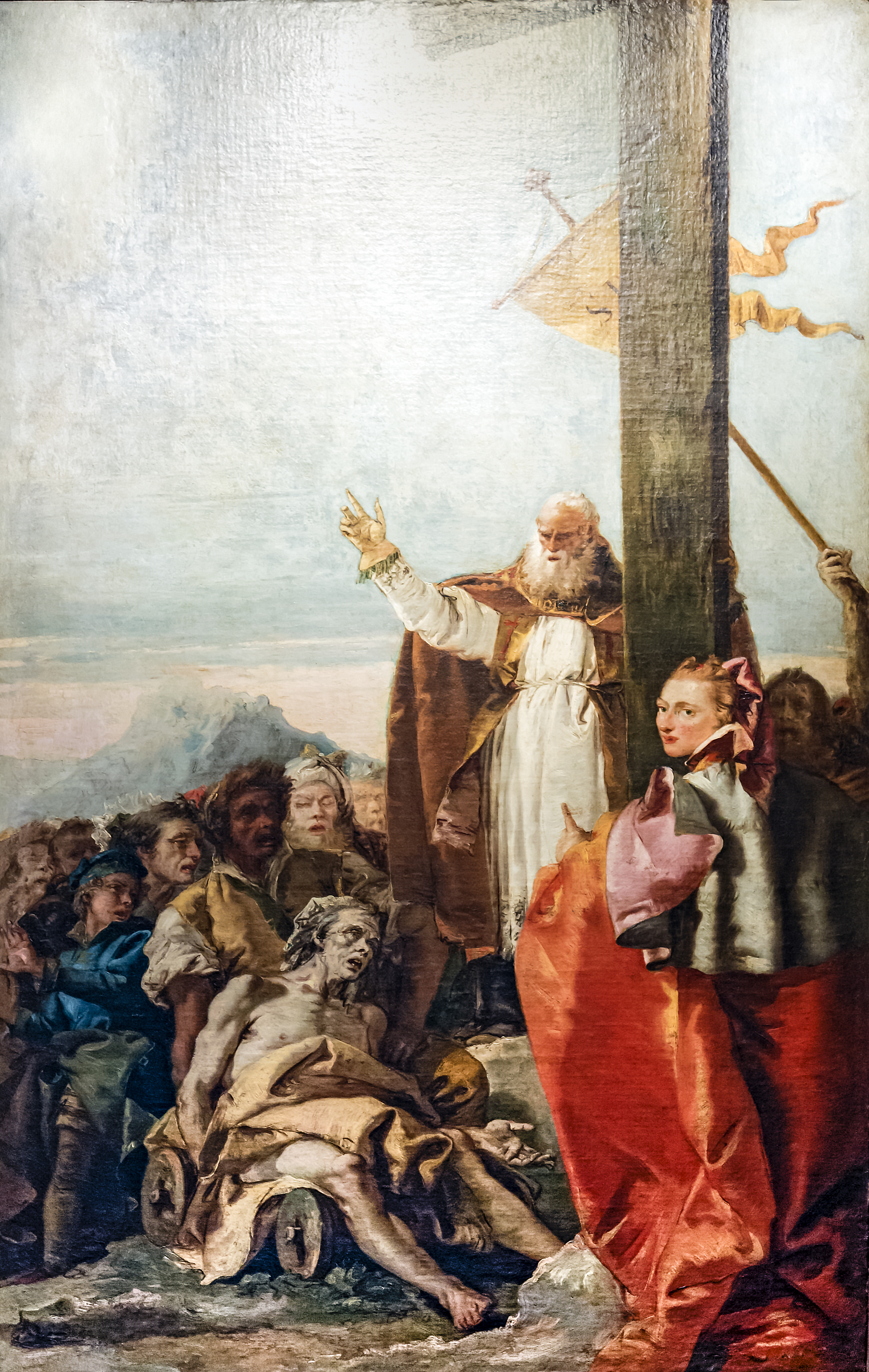
- The Finding of the True Cross (Giandomenico Tiepolo), where Bishop Macarius blesses the sick with the True Cross

Metropolitan of Jerusalem
- Born: unknown
- Died: ca. 335
- Venerated in: Eastern Orthodox Church; Catholic Church
- Major shrine: Relics of Saint Macarius, including his skull, are located in Saint Anthony's Chapel, Pittsburgh, Pennsylvania.
- Feast: 10 March
- Attributes: Bishop

Macarius I (Greek: Μακάριος Α' Ἱεροσολύμων Makarios I Hierosolymōn) was Bishop of Jerusalem from 312 to shortly before 335, according to Sozomen. He is venerated as a saint within the Eastern Orthodox Church and Catholic Church.

Athanasius, in one of his orations against Arianism, refers to Macarius as an example of "the honest and simple style of apostolical men." The date 312 for Macarius's accession to the episcopate is found in Jerome's version of Eusebius of Caesarea's Chronicle.

About 325 he accompanied Helena Augusta, the mother of Constantine I in her search at Jerusalem for relics of the Passion of Jesus, including the cross on which Jesus of Nazareth was thought to have been crucified.

According to Eusebius, he received a long letter from Constantine with reference to the building of the Basilica of the Holy Sepulchre at Jerusalem: "Such is our Saviour's grace, that no power of language seems adequate to describe the wondrous circumstance to which I am about to refer. For, that the monument of his most holy Passion, so long ago buried beneath the ground, should have remained unknown for so long a series of years, until its reappearance to his servants now set free through the removal of him who was the common enemy of all, is a fact which truly surpasses all admiration ... And as to the columns and marbles, whatever you shall judge, after actual inspection of the plan, to be especially precious and serviceable, be diligent to send information to us in writing, in order that whatever quantity or sort of materials we shall esteem from your letter to be needful, may be procured from every quarter, as required, for it is fitting that the most marvelous place in the world should be worthily decorated."

Macarius is listed as one of the bishops to whom Pope Alexander of Alexandria wrote warning against Arius. His death must have been before the Council of Tyre, in 335, at which his successor, Maximus, was apparently one of the bishops present.

== Macarius and Arianism ==
Macarius took part in the Council of Nicaea (325), and two conjectures as to the part he played there are worth mentioning. The first is that there was a passage of arms between him and his metropolitan, Eusebius of Caesarea, concerning the rights of their respective sees. The seventh canon of the council — "As custom and ancient tradition show that the bishop of Ælia [Jerusalem] ought to be honoured, he shall have precedence; without prejudice, however, to the dignity which belongs to the Metropolis" — by its vagueness suggests that it was the result of a drawn battle. The second conjecture is that Macarius, together with Eustathius of Antioch, had a good deal to do with the drafting of the Nicene Creed finally adopted by the First Council of Nicæa in 325.

The vigour of his opposition to the theology of Arianism is suggested by the abusive manner in which Arius writes of him in his letter to Eusebius of Nicomedia. In the "History of the Council of Nicæa" attributed to Gelasius of Cyzicus there are a number of imaginary disputations between Fathers of the Council and philosophers in the pay of Arius. In one of these disputes where Macarius is spokesman for the bishops he defends the Descent into Hell. This, in view of the question whether the Descent into Hell was found in the Jerusalem Creed, is notable, especially as in other respects Macarius's language is made conformable to that Creed. Macarius's name appears first among those of the bishops of Palestine who subscribed to the Council of Nicæa; that of Eusebius comes fifth. Athanasius, in his encyclical letter to the bishops of Egypt and Libya, places the name of Macarius (who had been long dead at that time) among those bishops renowned for their orthodoxy. Sozomen narrates that Macarius appointed Maximus, who afterwards succeeded him, Bishop of Lydia, and that the appointment did not take effect because the people of Jerusalem refused to part with Maximus. He also gives another version of the story, to the effect that Macarius himself changed his mind, fearing that, if Maximus was out of the way, an unorthodox bishop would be appointed to succeed him (Macarius). Tillemont discredits this story: Macarius by so acting would have contravened the seventh canon of Nicæa and Aetius, who at the time of the council was Bishop of Lydda, was certainly alive in 331, and very probably in 349. Of course, if Aetius outlived Macarius, the story breaks down; but if he died shortly after 331, it seems plausible enough. The fact that Macarius was then nearing his end would explain the reluctance, whether on his part or that of his flock, to be deprived of Maximus. Tillemont's first objection carries no weight. The seventh canon was too vague to secure from an orthodox bishop like Macarius very strict views as to the metropolitan rights of a Semi-Arian like Eusebius.

== Macarius and the Holy Sites ==
Theophanes (d. 818) in his Chronography makes Constantine, at the end of the Council of Nicæa, order Macarius to search for the sites of the Resurrection and the Passion, and the True Cross. It is likely that this is what happened, for excavations were begun very soon after the council, and, it would seem under the superintendence of Macarius.

The huge mound and stonework with the temple of Venus on the top, which in the time of Hadrian had been piled up over the Holy Sepulchre, were demolished, and "when the original surface of the ground appeared, forthwith, contrary to all expectation, the hallowed monument of our Saviour's Resurrection was discovered". On hearing the news Constantine wrote to Macarius giving lavish orders for the erection of a church on the site. Later on, he wrote another letter "To Macarius and the rest of the Bishops of Palestine" ordering a church to be built at Mambre, which also had been defiled by a pagan shrine. Eusebius, though he gives the superscription as above, speaks of this letter as "addressed to me", thinking, perhaps of his metropolitan dignity (Vit. Const., III, 51-53). Churches were also built on the sites of the Nativity and Ascension.

== Veneration ==
Macarius is recognised as a saint within the Orthodox and Roman Catholic traditions. Relics of Saint Macarius, including his skull, are located in Saint Anthony's Chapel (Pittsburgh, Pennsylvania).

St. Macarius' feast day is commemorated on March 10.

== Sources and external links ==
- Catholic Encyclopedia: St. Macarius
- Henry Wace, A Dictionary of Christian Biography: St. Macarius
- An image of Saint Macarius in the context of the Feast of the Exultation of the Holy Cross

Preceded by Ermon	Bishop of Jerusalem; 314–333	Succeeded by Maximus III
