= Our Lady of the Annunciation Church, Amman =

Our Lady of the Annunciation Church
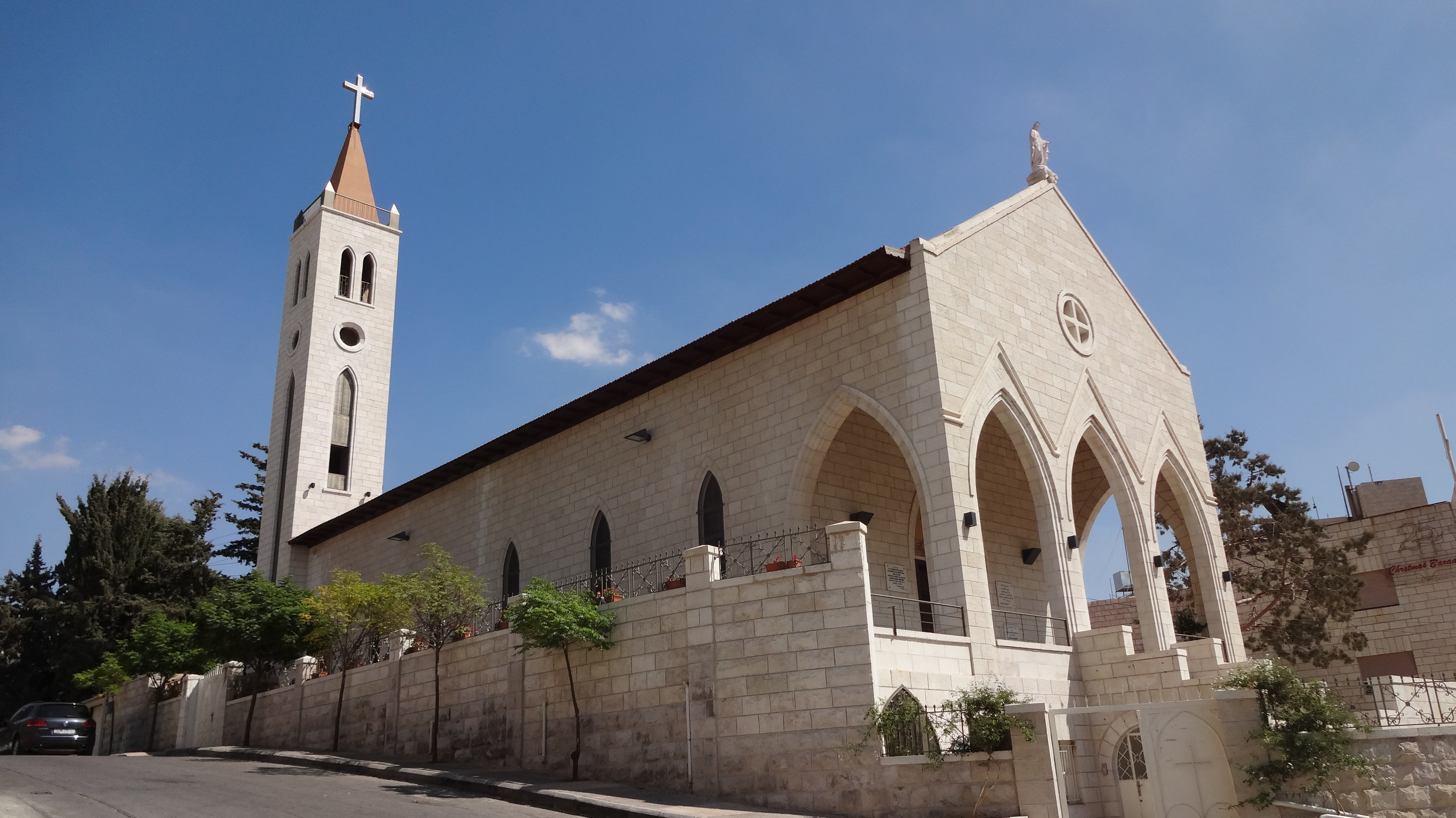
- Our Lady of the Annunciation Church
- 31°57′19″N 35°55′28″E
- Location: Amman
- Country: Jordan
- Denomination: Roman Catholic Church

History
- Founded: 1961

Our Lady of the Annunciation Church or simply Church of Jabal Webdeh is a Catholic parish in Jabal al-Luweibdeh in the city of Amman.

The parish is Roman (or Latin) rite, under the jurisdiction of the Latin Patriarchate of Jerusalem (Patriarcha Hierosolymitanus Latinorum). The parish celebrated its 50-year parish anniversary in 2012, and was restored for the occasion with funds from the Patriarchate.

The Patriarchate was restored by Pope Pius IX in 1847 by the apostolic brief Nulla celebrior.

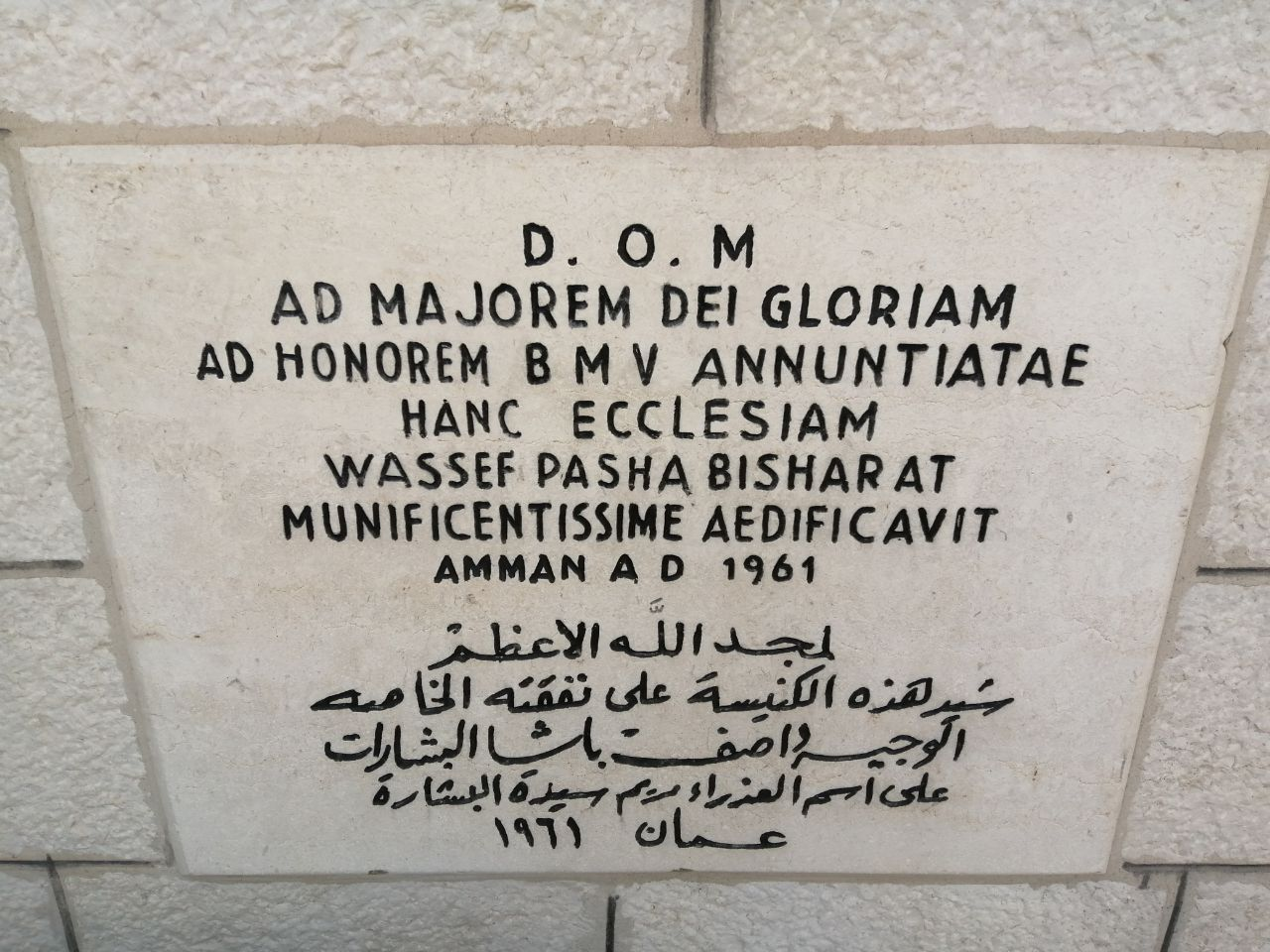
Dedication plaque in Latin and Arabic

== See also ==
- Roman Catholicism in Jordan
