= Justus II of Jerusalem =

2nd century Jewish Christian bishop

Justus II of Jerusalem was a 2nd-century Jewish Christian bishop of Jerusalem.

According to Eusebius of Caesarea, there were thirteen bishops of Jerusalem, all Jewish Christians, and he was 11th on that list. Exact dates are not given by Eusebius for his bishopric.

Justus is also mentioned in the apocryphal Letter of James to Quadratus, and Epiphanius of Salamis.

Some scholars have suggested that he was not a bishop but rather a presbyter assisting James the first Bishop, though this is controversial.
