= Matthias of Jerusalem =

Saint Matthias of Jerusalem

Bishop of Jerusalem
- Died: 120
- Venerated in: Roman Catholic Church
- Feast: 30 January

Matthias of Jerusalem (died 120 AD) was a 2nd-century Christian saint and a Bishop of Jerusalem, whose episcopacy was about 113–120 AD.

Matthew was probably bishop for few years after Tobias until 120. During his episcopacy, he dealt with a troubled political situation due to Roman persecution of Christians and a Jewish uprising. According to Eusebius of Caesarea he was a Jewish Christian. He was persecuted by Emperor Hadrian (117–138), but died peacefully about 120 AD.
