= St. Mary's Church, Larnaca =

St. Mary's Church
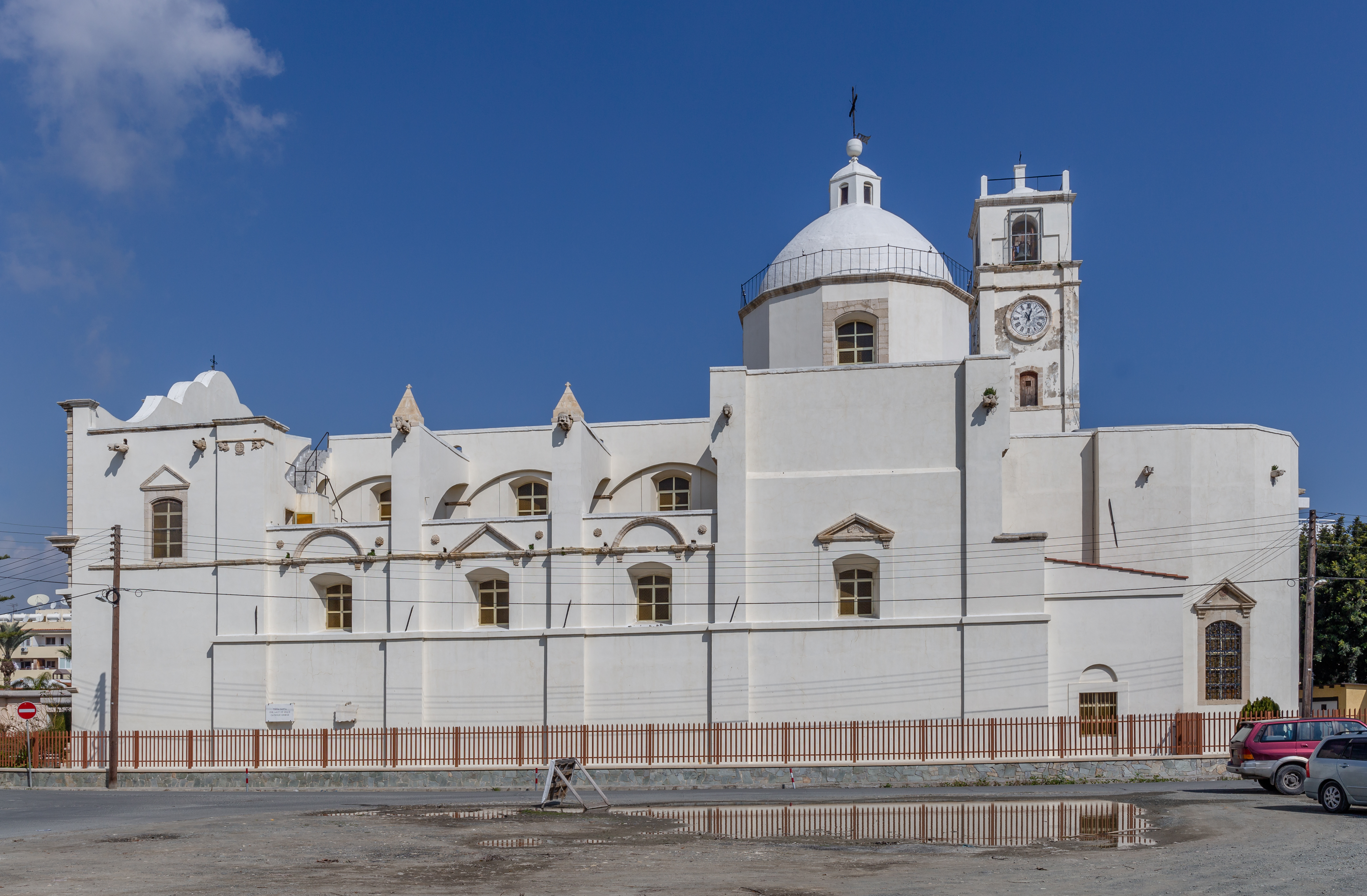
- St. Mary's Church
- 34.9232°N 33.6263°E
- Location: Larnaca
- Country: Cyprus
- Denomination: Roman Catholic Church

History
- Founded: 1848

St. Mary's Church, also known as Our Lady of Grace Catholic Church or Terra Santa Our Lady of Grace Catholic Church, is a Roman Catholic church in Larnaca, Cyprus.

The Franciscans have been resident in Larnaca since 1593; the current church building is the third in a series of three buildings erected on the same site. The foundation stone of this third church was laid on July 10, 1842, and officially and solemnly consecrated on December 8, 1848, by Father Bernardino Trionfetti, OFM Obs., Custos of the Holy Land. The facade was not completed until 1993.

The church is part of a monastery complex of the Franciscan order, which, in addition to the church and monastery, has also included a retirement home since 1972. The architect, the Franciscan Serafino Da Roccascelima, designed the church inspired by the church architecture of southern Italy, particularly that of the 17th and 18th centuries. The church is built in the shape of a Latin cross and has three narthexes, a dome, and a peristyle (colonnade). The bell tower rises above a square floor plan.

The church is located in the northeastern district of Larnaca at Terra Santa Street 1 in Larnaka.
