= Wedding Church at Cana =

Coordinates: 32.7467°N 35.3386°E

- כנסיית החתונה
- كنيسة الزفاف في كنا
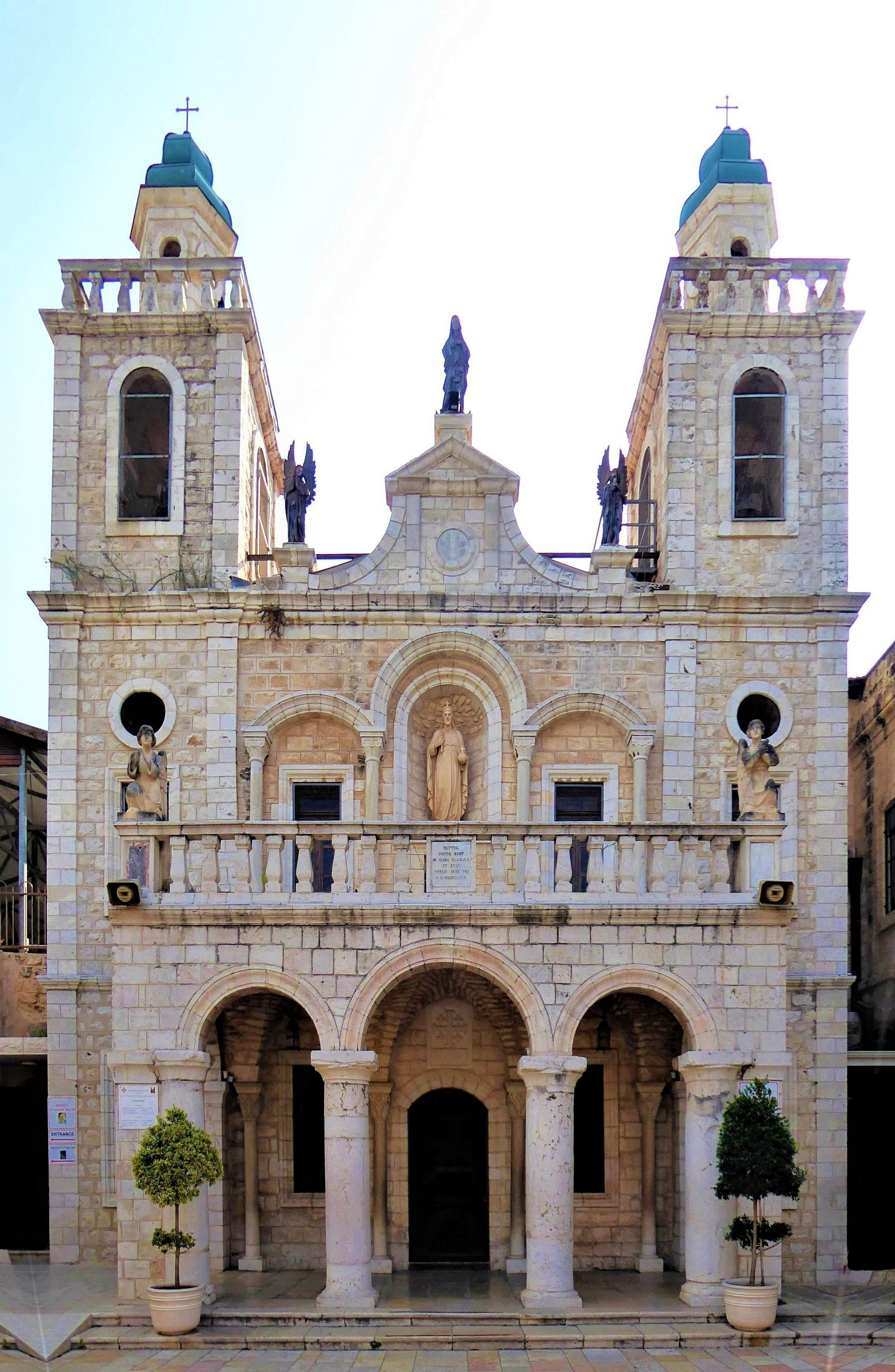
- Wedding Church at Cana
- Location: Kafr Kanna
- Country: Israel
- Denomination: Roman Catholic Church

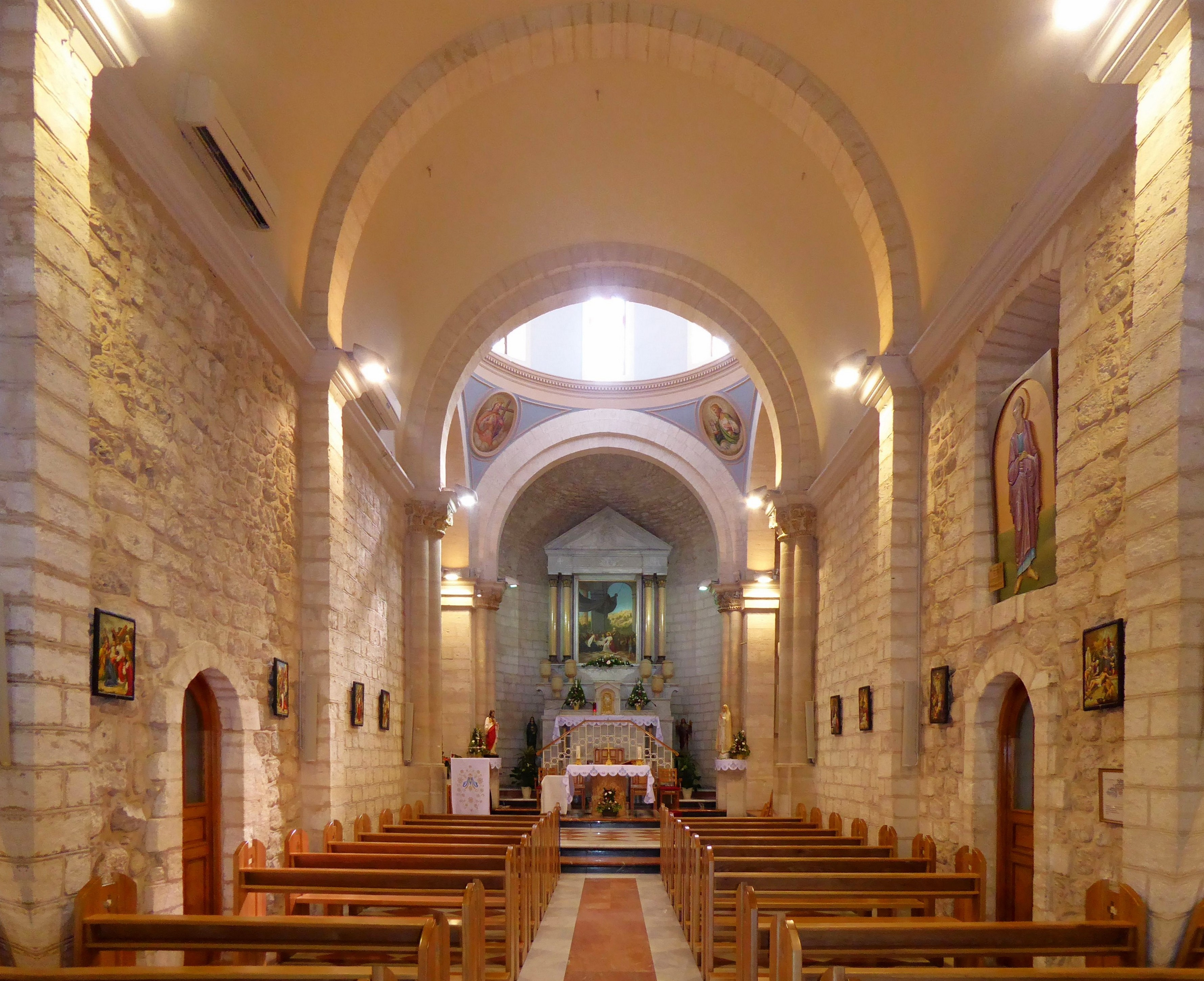
Internal View

The Wedding Church at Cana (Arabic: كنيسة الزفاف في كنا; Hebrew: כנסיית החתונה) or simply Wedding Church, also Franciscan Wedding Church, is a religious building of the Catholic Church located in the central part of the town of Kafr Kanna (Cana), in Lower Galilee, located in northern Israel. It is dedicated to the weddings of Christianity. Its name commemorates the event of the Wedding at Cana from the Gospel of John, thought by some Christians to have taken place on the site, during which Jesus performed his first miracle, by turning water into wine at the request or behest of Mary.

The Church is owned by the Custody of the Holy Land, part of the Franciscan order in the Catholic Church. The current church was built circa 1881, and expanded from 1897-1905, following efforts by the Franciscans to acquire the site between 1641 and 1879, when acquisition was completed. Twentieth-century archaeological excavations indicated that, before the current church building, the site housed a Jewish synagogue in the fourth and fifth centuries, and tombs under the rule of the Byzantine Empire in the fifth and sixth centuries.

In 1901 the current facade was built, and September 30, 1906, Bishop Angelo Roncalli consecrated the altar. In the second half of the 1990s, the Holy Land began an extensive renovation of the church, completed in 1999.

== See also ==
- Marriage at Cana or Wedding at Cana, the Biblical story associated with this site
- The Wedding at Cana, a 1563 painting by the Italian artist Paolo Veronese (1528–88), depicting the event
- Roman Catholicism in Israel
