= Joseph I of Jerusalem =

2nd-century Jewish Christian bishop

Joseph I of Jerusalem was a 2nd-century Jewish Christian bishop of Jerusalem.

According to Eusebius of Caesarea, there were fifteen bishops of Jerusalem, all Jewish Christians, and he was 14th on that list. Exact dates are not given by Eusebius for his bishopric though it was probably in the 130s.
