= Zamudas of Jerusalem =

Bishop of Jerusalem from 276 to 283

Saint Zamudas of Jerusalem
- Died: c. 283 AD
- Venerated in: Roman Catholic Church
- Feast: February 19

Zamudas (Zambdas, Zabdas, Bazas) of Jerusalem was the thirty-seventh bishop of Jerusalem. There are divergent dates on the period of his episcopate, with some sources placing it between 276 and 283, while one source dates it to as late as 302. He succeeded Hymenaeus as bishop. He is venerated as a saint and is connected with the legend of the Theban Legion.
