= Maximus III of Jerusalem =

Bishop of Jerusalem

Saint Maximus of Jerusalem

Bishop of Jerusalem
- Born: unknown
- Died: 347
- Venerated in: Roman Catholic Church; Eastern Orthodox Church
- Feast: May 5 (Catholic Church); May 9 (Orthodox Church locally); August 26 (Orthodox Church Universally)

Saint Maximus of Jerusalem (Maximus III of Jerusalem) was an early Christian saint and bishop of Jerusalem from roughly 333 AD to his death in 347 AD. He was the third bishop of Jerusalem named Maximus, the other two being in the latter half of the 2nd century.

During one of the persecutions of his era he was tortured for his Christian faith, and thus became known as a confessor, although modern sources disagree as to whether this happened in the reign of Galerius Maximianus or the reign co-emperors Diocletian and Maximian. He was a priest in Jerusalem, and it is said by Sozomen that he was so popular among the people for good character and for being a confessor that when Saint Macarius attempted to appoint him as bishop of Lydda (also known as Diospolis) the populace insisted upon his retention in Jerusalem. Upon Macarius' death Maximus became bishop of Jerusalem, and was present in 335 at the first synod of Tyre, and signed that council's condemnation of Athanasius. During Athanasius' return from exile, circa 346, Maximus convoked a synod in Jerusalem of sixteen Palestinian bishops that welcomed Athanasius. Socrates Scholasticus recorded that Maximus "restored communion and rank" to Athanasius, Athanasius receiving support against the Arians and Maximus advancing the desire of the bishops of Jerusalem to have their see be equal in status to the metropolitan see of Caesarea, a desire later achieved in 451 AD.

Maximus was succeeded as bishop of Jerusalem by saint Cyril, though the process is unclear. Sozomen and Socrates say that Maximus had been deposed in favor of Cyril by Acacius of Caesarea and Patrophilus of Scythopolis, both Arians. Jerome says instead that Maximus' intended successor was Heraclius, whom Maximus had named upon his death bed, but that Acacius and Cyril deposed Heraclius and made Cyril bishop. Rufinus (CH, 10.24) mentions only that the ordination was in some unspecified way "irregular". Regardless of how the succession came about, Cyril and Acacius would become bitter enemies during the next few years, disagreeing both in the Arian controversy and in terms of the precedence and rights of each see.

The Roman Catholic Church marks his feast day on May 5, and the Eastern Orthodox Church on May 9, locally. Eastern Orthodox Liturgics Wikipedia also notes his Universal and therefore main feast as August 26.

Preceded by Macarius	Bishop of Jerusalem; 335–350	Succeeded by Cyril
