= Alexander of Jerusalem =

Christian bishop and saint (died 251)

Saint Alexander of Jerusalem
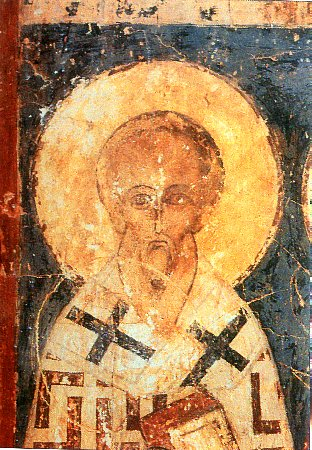

Bishop and Martyr
- Born: 2nd century AD
- Died: 251 AD; Caesarea Maritima, Syria Palaestina
- Venerated in: Eastern Orthodox Church; Oriental Orthodox Churches; Roman Catholic Church; Anglican Communion
- Canonized: Pre-Congregation
- Feast: March 18 (Roman Catholic Church); May 16/29 and December 12/25 (Eastern Orthodox Church)

Alexander of Jerusalem (Greek: Αλέξανδρος Ιεροσολύμων; died 251 AD) was a third century bishop who is venerated as a martyr and saint by the Eastern Orthodox Church, Oriental Orthodox churches, and the Roman Catholic Church. He died during the persecution of Emperor Decius.

== Education ==
=== Alexandria ===
Alexander of Jerusalem was a prominent pupil of Clement of Alexandria. Their relationship is well-documented by early church historians, most notably Eusebius of Caesarea in his work Ecclesiastical History. Alexander often expressed his deep reverence for Clement, referring to him as his "master" and "blessed father." Alexander studied under Clement at the Catechetical School of Alexandria toward the end of the 2nd century. He was a contemporary and close friend of Origen, another of Clement's famous students. He also refers to his teacher Pantaenus. Both his teachers, Pantaenus (originally a Stoic philosopher) and Clement (Hellenistic education, Plato and Stoicism), had a background in Hellenistic philosophy and had converted to and developed early Christian theology. The early Church, particularly in Alexandria, actively modeled the office of the bishop and the role of the Christian teacher after the Hellenistic Scholarch (the head of a philosophy school).

== Career ==
=== Bishop of Cappadocia ===
Alexander was originally from Cappadocia and became Cappadocia's first bishop. Most historians, including Eusebius of Caesarea, identify Alexander as the earliest verifiable bishop of the region. He served there around 200–212 AD before moving to the see of Jerusalem. During his time as bishop, Alexander hosted his teacher Clement of Alexandria, who had fled the Severan persecution in Egypt. Together, they are credited with strengthening the theological foundation of the Cappadocian church, effectively turning it into a center of learning.

Alexander originally served as a bishop in Cappadocia before becoming the coadjutor (and eventually the sole bishop) of Jerusalem. He was the first recorded instance of a bishop being translated from one see to another.

=== Jerusalem ===
Afterwards he was associated as coadjutor with the Bishop of Jerusalem, Narcissus, who was, at that time, very old. Alexander had been imprisoned for his faith in the time of Roman Emperor Alexander Severus (r. 13 March 222 – March 235 CE). After his release, he came to Jerusalem, where the aged Bishop Narcissus prevailed on Alexander to remain and assist him in the government of that see.

It was Alexander who permitted Origen, despite being a layman, to speak in the churches. For this concession he was taken to task, but he defended himself by examples of other permissions of the same kind given even to Origen himself elsewhere, although then quite young. Alban Butler says that they had studied together in the great Christian school of Alexandria. Alexander ordained him a priest.

Alexander is praised for the library he built at Jerusalem. Though at his time Jerusalem was officially known as Aelia Capitolina, the name used by the Roman authorities since the city was rebuilt by the Emperor Hadrian, Christian tradition persisted in using the original name.

== Persecution and death ==
He died in prison at Caesarea during the Decian persecution (c. 250–251 AD) after refusing to renounce his faith. In spite of his years, he, with several other bishops, was carried off a prisoner to Caesarea, and as the historians say, "The glory of his white hairs and great sanctity formed a double crown for him in captivity". His vita states that he suffered many tortures, but survived them all. When the wild beasts were brought to devour him, some licked his feet, and others their impress on the sand of the arena.

== Veneration ==
His feast is kept by the Roman Catholic Church on March 18, by the Eastern Orthodox Churches on May 16/29 and December 12/25.

== Writings ==
Eusebius has preserved fragments of a letter written by him to the Antinoïtes; of another to the Antiochenes; of a third to Origen; and of another, written in conjunction with Theoctistus of Caesarea, to Demetrius of Alexandria.

Religious titles
Preceded by Gordius of Jerusalem (Narcissus of Jerusalem)	Bishop of Jerusalem; 231–251 (213–251)	Succeeded by Mazabanis of Jerusalem
