= Narcissus of Jerusalem =

Christian saint (died c.216)

Saint Narcissus of Jerusalem
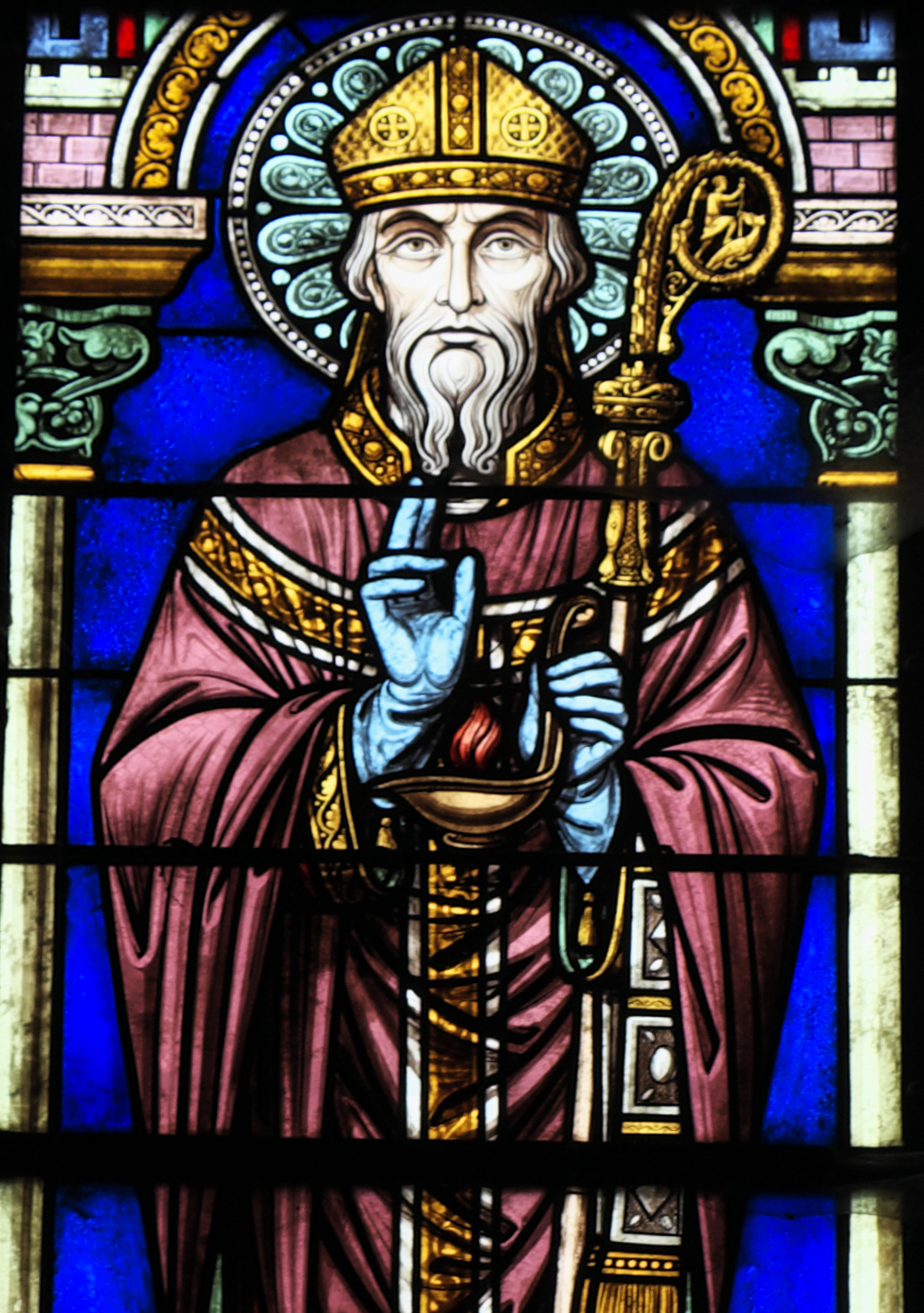
- Stained glass window depicting St Narcissus

Bishop of Jerusalem and Confessor
- Born: c. March 9, AD 99; Aelia Capitolina (Jerusalem)
- Died: c. AD 216 (aged around 117); Aelia Capitolina (Jerusalem)
- Venerated in: Catholic Church; Eastern Orthodox Church; Oriental Orthodoxy
- Canonized: Pre-Congregation
- Feast: October 29 (General Roman Calendar); August 7 (Eastern Orthodox liturgical calendar)
- Attributes: Depicted as a bishop holding a thistle in blossom; pitcher of water near him; an angel depicted carrying his soul to Heaven.

Narcissus of Jerusalem (c. March 9, AD 99 – c. 216) was an early patriarch of Jerusalem. He is venerated as a saint by both the Western and Eastern Churches. In the Roman Catholic Church, his feast day is celebrated on October 29, while in the Eastern Orthodox Church it is celebrated on August 7.

== Life ==
It is inferred that the average reign of the bishops of Jerusalem was short, as evidenced by the episcopal reigns of those who followed Simeon, the second bishop of Jerusalem, who was martyred in the year 117 by the Emperor Trajan. Of Greek origin, tradition holds that Narcissus was born in the year 99 and was at least 80 when he was made the 30th bishop of Jerusalem, bishop of Caesarea in Palestine, presided over a council held by the bishops of Palestine in Caesarea, and it was decreed that Easter was to be always kept on a Sunday, and not with the Jewish Passover. According to Eusebius, the bishop performed many miracles. One miracle of note, as Eusebius testified, had occurred during the Easter Vigil when Narcissus changed water into oil to supply all the lamps of the church.

Narcissus was the subject of several serious allegations made by members of the Christian community, but these proved to be false. He forgave his accusers, but left Jerusalem and lived in seclusion for several years.

Three bishops governed the See of Jerusalem in succession during his absence. Upon his return to Jerusalem, the people unanimously sought him out and asked him to resume his episcopal duties. This he did, but owing to his extreme age and the weight of his duties, he made Alexander of Jerusalem his coadjutor bishop. Narcissus continued to serve his flock and other churches outside his jurisdiction by his constant prayer and his exhortations to the faithful for unity and peace.
