= Imeneus of Jerusalem =

Imeneus of Jerusalem (260–276) also known as Hymeneus was the bishop of the Church of Jerusalem from 266 to 298. Imeneus was the second highest ranking delegate after Helenus, the Bishop of Tarsus, at the council in Antioch that was called in 268 to address the heresy of Paul of Samosata. Hymeneus reposed in 298.
