= Ermon of Jerusalem =

Bishop of the Church of Jerusalem from 300-312

Hermon of Jerusalem, also Ermon, was the bishop of the Church of Jerusalem from 300 to 312.

While nothing is known of his life, Church tradition records his efforts of sending a series of missionary bishops to areas around the northeastern areas of the Black Sea.

With the establishment of a see at Cherson, Patr. Hermon sent a series of bishops, who became known as the hieromartyrs of Cherson, to the Black Sea region from the Danube to the Dniepr Rivers including Crimea. The first bishops were Ephraim and Basil. They were followed by Eugene, Agathodorus, Capiton and Elpidius, and finally Aetherius. All but Aetherius were martyred, who died in a ship wreck.
