= Athanasian Creed =

Christian statement of belief focused on Trinitarian doctrine and Christology

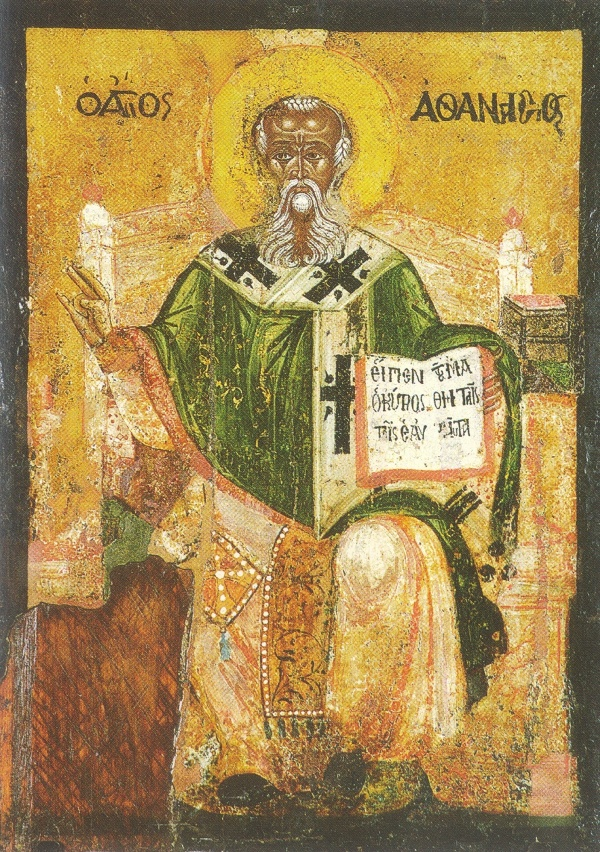
Athanasius of Alexandria was traditionally thought to be the author of the Athanasian Creed, which is hence named after him

The Athanasian Creed—also called the Quicunque Vult (or Quicumque Vult), which is both its Latin name and its opening words, meaning "Whosoever wishes"—is a Christian statement of belief focused on Trinitarian doctrine and Christology. Used by Christian churches since the early sixth century, it was the first creed to explicitly state the equality of the three hypostases of the Trinity. It differs from the Nicene-Constantinopolitan Creed and the Apostles' Creed in that it includes anathemas condemning those who disagree with its statements, as does the original Nicene Creed.

Widely accepted in Western Christianity, including by the Roman Catholic Church, Lutheran churches (it is part of the Lutheran confessions set out in the Book of Concord), Anglican churches, Reformed churches, and ancient liturgical churches, the Athanasian Creed has been used in public worship less frequently, with exception of Trinity Sunday. However, part of it can be found as an "Authorized Affirmation of Faith" in the main volume of the Common Worship liturgy of the Church of England published in 2000. Despite falling out of liturgical use, the creed's influence on current Protestant understanding of trinitarian doctrine is clear.

Designed to distinguish Nicene Christianity from Arianism, the Athanasian Creed traditionally was recited at the Sunday Office of Prime in the Western Church. It has not been commonly used in the Eastern Church.

== Origin ==
The Shield of the Trinity, a visual representation of the doctrine of the Trinity, derived from the Athanasian Creed

There is a possible allusion to the Creed in Gregory of Nazianzen's Oration in praise of Athanasius: (Note: Gregory lived c. 329 to 25 January 390.)

For, when all the rest who sympathised with us were divided into three parties, and many were faltering in their conception of the Son, and still more in that of the Holy Ghost, (a point on which to be only slightly in error was to be orthodox) and few indeed were sound upon both points, he was the first and only one, or with the concurrence of but a few, to venture to confess in writing, with entire clearness and distinctness, the Unity of Godhead and Essence of the Three Persons, and thus to attain in later days, under the influence of inspiration, to the same faith in regard to the Holy Ghost, as had been bestowed at an earlier time on most of the Fathers in regard to the Son. This confession, a truly royal and magnificent gift, he presented to the Emperor, opposing to the unwritten innovation, a written account of the orthodox faith, so that an emperor might be overcome by an emperor, reason by reason, treatise by treatise.

— Oration 21, p. 33

A medieval account credited Athanasius of Alexandria, the famous defender of Nicene theology, as the author of the Creed. According to that account, Athanasius composed it during his exile in Rome and presented it to Pope Julius I as a witness to his orthodoxy. The traditional attribution of the Creed to Athanasius was first called into question in 1642 by the Dutch Protestant theologian Gerhard Johann Vossius.

It has since been widely accepted by modern scholars that the creed was not authored by Athanasius, that it was not originally called a creed at all and that Athanasius's name was not originally attached to it. Athanasius's name seems to have become attached to the creed as a sign of its strong declaration of Trinitarian faith. The reasoning for rejecting Athanasius as the author usually relies on a combination of the following:

1. The creed originally was most likely written in Latin, but Athanasius composed in Greek.
2. Neither Athanasius nor his contemporaries ever mention the Creed.
3. It is not mentioned in any records of the ecumenical councils.
4. It appears to address theological concerns that developed after Athanasius died (including the filioque).
5. It was most widely circulated among Western Christians.

The use of the creed in a sermon by Caesarius of Arles, as well as a theological resemblance to works by Vincent of Lérins, point to Southern Gaul as its origin. The most likely time frame is in the late fifth or early sixth century AD, at least 100 years after Athanasius lived. The Christian theology of the creed is firmly rooted in the Augustinian tradition and uses the exact terminology of Augustine's On the Trinity, published 415 AD. In the late 19th century, there was a great deal of speculation about who might have authored the creed, with suggestions including Ambrose of Milan, Venantius Fortunatus and Hilary of Poitiers.

The 1940 discovery of a lost work by Vincent of Lérins, which bears a striking similarity to much of the language of the Athanasian Creed, has led many to conclude that the creed originated with Vincent or his students. For example, in the authoritative modern monograph about the creed, J. N. D. Kelly asserts that Vincent of Lérins was not its author but that it may have come from the same milieu, the area of Lérins in southern Gaul.

The oldest surviving manuscripts of the Athanasian Creed date from the late 8th century.

== Content ==
Athanasian Creed
Recording of the Athanasian Creed in English

The Athanasian Creed is usually divided into two sections: lines 1–28 address the doctrine of the Trinity, and lines 29–44 address the doctrine of Christology. Enumerating the three persons of the Trinity (Father, the Son, and the Holy Spirit), the first section of the creed ascribes the divine attributes to each individually. Thus, each person of the Trinity is described as uncreated (increatus), limitless (immensus, lit. 'measureless'), eternal (æternus), and omnipotent (omnipotens).

While ascribing the divine attributes and divinity to each person of the Trinity, thus avoiding subordinationism, the first half of the Athanasian Creed also stresses the unity of the three persons in the one Godhead, thus avoiding a theology of tritheism.

The text of the Athanasian Creed is as follows:

in Latin	English translation
Quicumque vult salvus esse, ante omnia opus est, ut teneat Catholicam fidem: Quam nisi quisque integram inviolatamque servaverit, absque dubio in aeternum peribit. Fides autem Catholica haec est: ut unum Deum in Trinitate, et Trinitatem in unitate veneremur. Neque confundentes personas, neque substantiam separantes. Alia est enim persona Patris alia Filii, alia Spiritus Sancti: Sed Patris, et Filii, et Spiritus Sancti una est divinitas, aequalis gloria, coeterna maiestas. Qualis Pater, talis Filius, talis [et] Spiritus Sanctus. Increatus Pater, increatus Filius, increatus [et] Spiritus Sanctus. Immensus Pater, immensus Filius, immensus [et] Spiritus Sanctus. Aeternus Pater, aeternus Filius, aeternus [et] Spiritus Sanctus. Et tamen non tres aeterni, sed unus aeternus. Sicut non tres increati, nec tres immensi, sed unus increatus, et unus immensus. Similiter omnipotens Pater, omnipotens Filius, omnipotens [et] Spiritus Sanctus. Et tamen non tres omnipotentes, sed unus omnipotens. Ita Deus Pater, Deus Filius, Deus [et] Spiritus Sanctus. Et tamen non tres dii, sed unus est Deus. Ita Dominus Pater, Dominus Filius, Dominus [et] Spiritus Sanctus. Et tamen non tres Domini, sed unus [est] Dominus. Quia, sicut singillatim unamquamque personam Deum ac Dominum confiteri christiana veritate compellimur: Ita tres Deos aut [tres] Dominos dicere Catholica religione prohibemur. Pater a nullo est factus: nec creatus, nec genitus. Filius a Patre solo est: non factus, nec creatus, sed genitus. Spiritus Sanctus a Patre et Filio: non factus, nec creatus, nec genitus, sed procedens. Unus ergo Pater, non tres Patres: unus Filius, non tres Filii: unus Spiritus Sanctus, non tres Spiritus Sancti. Et in hac Trinitate nihil prius aut posterius, nihil maius aut minus: Sed totae tres personae coaeternae sibi sunt et coaequales. Ita, ut per omnia, sicut iam supra dictum est, et unitas in Trinitate, et Trinitas in unitate veneranda sit. Qui vult ergo salvus esse, ita de Trinitate sentiat. Sed necessarium est ad aeternam salutem, ut incarnationem quoque Domini nostri Iesu Christi fideliter credat. Est ergo fides recta ut credamus et confiteamur, quia Dominus noster Iesus Christus, Dei Filius, Deus [pariter] et homo est. Deus [est] ex substantia Patris ante saecula genitus: et homo est ex substantia matris in saeculo natus. Perfectus Deus, perfectus homo: ex anima rationali et humana carne subsistens. Aequalis Patri secundum divinitatem: minor Patre secundum humanitatem. Qui licet Deus sit et homo, non duo tamen, sed unus est Christus. Unus autem non conversione divinitatis in carnem, sed assumptione humanitatis in Deum. Unus omnino, non confusione substantiae, sed unitate personae. Nam sicut anima rationalis et caro unus est homo: ita Deus et homo unus est Christus. Qui passus est pro salute nostra: descendit ad inferos: tertia die resurrexit a mortuis. Ascendit ad [in] caelos, sedet ad dexteram [Dei] Patris [omnipotentis]. Inde venturus [est] judicare vivos et mortuos. Ad cujus adventum omnes homines resurgere habent cum corporibus suis; Et reddituri sunt de factis propriis rationem. Et qui bona egerunt, ibunt in vitam aeternam: qui vero mala, in ignem aeternum. Haec est fides Catholica, quam nisi quisque fideliter firmiterque crediderit, salvus esse non poterit.	Whosoever will be saved, before all things it is necessary that he hold the catholic faith. Which faith unless every one do keep whole and undefiled, without doubt he shall perish everlastingly. And the catholic faith is this: that we worship one God in Trinity, and Trinity in Unity; neither confounding the Persons, nor dividing the Essence. For there is one Person of the Father; another of the Son; and another of the Holy Ghost. But the Godhead of the Father, of the Son, and of the Holy Ghost, is all one; the Glory equal, the Majesty coeternal. Such as the Father is; such is the Son; and such is the Holy Ghost. The Father uncreated; the Son uncreated; and the Holy Ghost uncreated. The Father infinite; the Son infinite; and the Holy Ghost infinite. The Father eternal; the Son eternal; and the Holy Ghost eternal. And yet they are not three eternals; but one eternal. As also there are not three uncreated; nor three infinites, but one uncreated; and one infinite. So likewise the Father is Almighty; the Son Almighty; and the Holy Ghost Almighty. And yet they are not three Almighties; but one Almighty. So the Father is God; the Son is God; and the Holy Ghost is God. And yet they are not three Gods; but one God. So likewise the Father is Lord; the Son Lord; and the Holy Ghost Lord. And yet not three Lords; but one Lord. For like as we are compelled by the Christian verity; to acknowledge every Person by himself to be God and Lord; So are we forbidden by the catholic religion; to say, There are three Gods, or three Lords. The Father is made of none; neither created, nor begotten. The Son is of the Father alone; not made, nor created; but begotten. The Holy Ghost is of the Father and of the Son; neither made, nor created, nor begotten; but proceeding. So there is one Father, not three Fathers; one Son, not three Sons; one Holy Ghost, not three Holy Ghosts. And in this Trinity none is before, or after another; none is greater, or less than another. But the whole three Persons are coeternal, and coequal. So that in all things, as aforesaid; the Unity in Trinity, and the Trinity in Unity, is to be worshipped. He therefore that will be saved, let him thus think of the Trinity. Furthermore, it is necessary to everlasting salvation; that he also believe faithfully the Incarnation of our Lord Jesus Christ. For the right Faith is, that we believe and confess; that our Lord Jesus Christ, the Son of God, is God and Man; God, of the Substance [Essence] of the Father; begotten before the worlds; and Man, of the Substance [Essence] of his mother, born in the world. Perfect God; and perfect Man, of a reasonable soul and human flesh subsisting. Equal to the Father, as touching his Godhead; and inferior to the Father as touching his Manhood. Who although he is God and Man; yet he is not two, but one Christ. One; not by conversion of the Godhead into flesh; but by assumption of the Manhood into God. One altogether; not by confusion of Substance [Essence]; but by unity of Person. For as the reasonable soul and flesh is one man; so God and Man is one Christ; Who suffered for our salvation; descended into hell; rose again the third day from the dead. He ascended into heaven, he sitteth on the right hand of God the Father Almighty, from whence he will come to judge the living and the dead. At whose coming all men will rise again with their bodies; And shall give account for their own works. And they that have done good shall go into life everlasting; and they that have done evil, into everlasting fire. This is the catholic faith; which except a man believe truly and firmly, he cannot be saved.

The Christology of the second section is more detailed than that of the Nicene Creed and reflects the teaching of the First Council of Ephesus in 431, and the creed of the Council of Chalcedon in 451. The Athanasian Creed uses the term substantia (a Latin translation of the Nicene ousia: 'being' or 'substance') with respect to the relation of the Son to the Father according to his divine nature, but it also says that the Son is substantia of his mother Mary according to his human nature.

The Creed's wording thus excludes Sabellianism and Arianism and the Christological heresies of Nestorianism and Eutychianism. A need for a clear confession against Arianism arose in Western Europe when the Ostrogoths and Visigoths, who had Arian beliefs, invaded at the beginning of the 5th century.

The final section of this Creed also moved beyond the Nicene and Apostles' Creeds in making negative statements about the people's fate: "They that have done good shall go into life everlasting: and they that have done evil into everlasting fire." That caused considerable debate in England in the mid-19th century, centred on the teaching of Frederick Denison Maurice.

== Uses ==
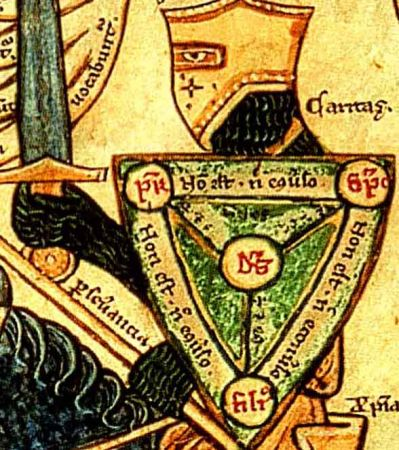
Detail of a 13th-century manuscript illustration for William Perault's Summa Vitiorum, depicting a knight carrying the "Shield of the Trinity"

Composed of 44 rhythmic lines, the Athanasian Creed appears to have been intended as a liturgical document, the original purpose of the creed being for it to be spoken or sung as a part of worship. The creed itself uses the language of public worship by speaking of the worship of God rather than the language of belief ("Now this is the catholic faith: We worship one God"). In the medieval Catholic Church, the creed was recited following the Sunday sermon or at the Sunday Office of Prime. The creed was often set to music and used in the place of a Psalm.

=== Protestantism ===
Early Protestants inherited the late medieval devotion to the Athanasian Creed, and it is considered to be authoritative in many Protestant churches. The statements of Protestant belief (confessional documents) of various Reformers commend the Athanasian Creed to their followers, including the Augsburg Confession, the Formula of Concord, the Second Helvetic Confession, the Belgic Confession, the Bohemian Confession and the Thirty-nine Articles.

A metric version, "Quicumque vult", with a musical setting, was published in The Whole Booke of Psalmes printed by John Day in 1562. Among modern Lutheran and Reformed churches adherence to the Athanasian Creed is prescribed by the earlier confessional documents, but the creed does not receive much attention outside occasional use, especially on Trinity Sunday.

In Reformed circles, it is included, for example, in the Christian Reformed Churches of Australia's 1991 Book of Forms. It is sometimes recited in liturgies of the Canadian Reformed churches and in the Protestant Reformed churches. The Four additional ancient creeds that they adhere to would be Apostles, Athanasian, Creed of Chalcedon, and Nicene Creed.

In the successive Books of Common Prayer of the reformed Church of England, from 1549 to 1662, its recitation was provided for on 19 occasions each year, a practice that continued until the 19th century, when vigorous controversy regarding its statement about 'eternal damnation' saw its use gradually decline. It remains one of the three Creeds approved in the Thirty-Nine Articles, and it is printed in several current Anglican prayer books, such as A Prayer Book for Australia (1995). As with Roman Catholic practice, its use is now generally only on Trinity Sunday or its octave. An Anglican devotional manual published by The Church Union, A Manual of Catholic Devotion: For Members of the Church of England, includes the Athanasian Creed with the prayers for Mattins, with the note: "Said on certain feasts at Mattins instead of the Apostles' Creed".

The Episcopal Church, based in the United States, has never provided for its use in worship, but added it to its Book of Common Prayer for the first time in 1979, where it is included in small print in a reference section, "Historical Documents of the Church". The Anglo-Catholic devotional manual Saint Augustine's Prayer Book, first published in 1947 and revised in 1967, includes the Athanasian Creed under "Devotions to the Holy Trinity".

==== Lutheranism ====
In Lutheranism, the Athanasian Creed is, along with the Apostles' and the Nicene Creed, one of the three ecumenical creeds and is placed at the beginning of the 1580 Book of Concord, the historic collection of authoritative doctrinal statements (confessions) of the Lutheran Church. It is still used in the liturgy on Trinity Sunday.

=== Catholicism ===
In Roman Catholic churches, it was traditionally said at Prime on Sundays when the Office was of the Sunday. The 1911 reforms reduced that to Sundays after Epiphany and Pentecost and on Trinity Sunday, except when a commemoration of a double feast or a day within an Octave occurred. The 1960 reforms further reduced its use to once a year, on Trinity Sunday.

It has been effectively dropped from the Catholic liturgy since the Second Vatican Council. It is maintained in the rite of exorcism of the Roman Rite. Opus Dei members recite it on the third Sunday of every month. Consistent with its presence in Anglican prayer books, it is preserved in Divine Worship: Daily Office, the official breviary approved for use in the personal ordinariates for former Anglicans.

A common visualization of the first half of the Creed is the Shield of the Trinity.
