= Wernigerode Armorial =

Armorial compiled in southern Germany

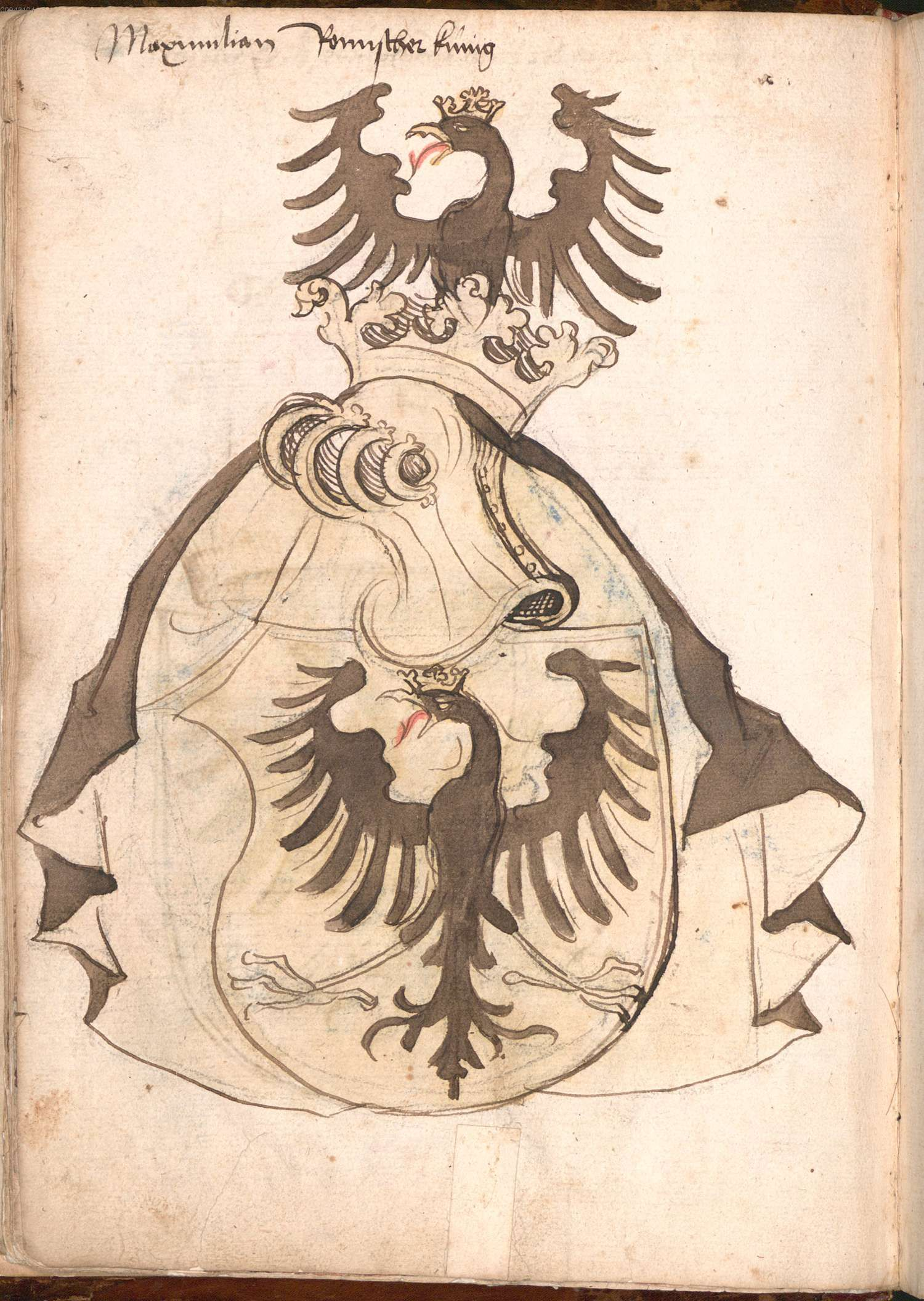
- Fol. 8v–Maximilian, Römischer König
- Author: Anonymous
- Original title: Wernigeroder Wappenbuch
- Language: German
- Genre: Armorial roll
- Publisher: Unknown
- Publication date: c. 1486–92
- Publication place: Germany
- Pages: 525

The Wernigerode Armorial (Bavarian State Library Cod.icon. 308 n, known in German as Wernigeroder Wappenbuch or Schaffhausensches Wappenbuch) is an armorial compiled in southern Germany (possibly near Nördlingen) in the late 15th century (between 1486–1492).

The book was formerly in possession of the Schaffhauser family of Schaffhausen, Ehingen am Ries, near Nördlingen, later kept in the Stolberg library of Wernigerode (signature Zi 33), with the dissolution of this library in 1927/8 passing into the private possession of Otto Hupp, and finally bought by the Bavarian State Library in 1949. The manuscript is the first of originally two volumes; the second volume has been lost. A third volume consists of a register to vols. 1 and 2, kept in the Halle University Library (signature Halle, UuLB: Zi 33).

It is an important witness of the transitional period from medieval to classical (early modern) conventions of heraldry (e.g. the papal arms are shown with the keys of Peter crossing behind the shield, a fashion which only gradually became adopted by the popes themselves during the 16th century, while the crossing keys above the shield were first used a few decades earlier, c. 1420s).

On 261 folia it presents various coats of arms, as was the custom at the time in order of descending rank, beginning with a number of purely fictitious or symbolic coats of arms, that of God, of Jesus Christ, of Death, of the "first arms" of kings Abysay, Sabytay, Banabias, of "King Alphonsus of Castilia", "the holy King Job", the "holy knight Eustachius", followed by the (real) royal arms of Sweden, Austria and Thuringia, and the attributed arms of the Nine Worthies.

After this, the armorial presents the actual coats of arms in use at the time, beginning with the papal arms of Innocent VIII, the imperial arms of Habsburg Austria and the Imperial Eagle of the Holy Roman Emperor, the royal arms of France (already attributed to Godfrey above), England and Greece. More royal and ducal arms are given, partly real and partly fictitious, including those of the Dauphin, Wessex(?), Italy (kingdom of Naples), Ireland, Outremer (the Jerusalem Cross), and of "Calistria, queen of the Amazons", Brittany, "the great Khan", Arabia, Nineveh, Granada, Bavaria, Hessen, Bavaria-Straubing and the Duke of Teck, Lorenzo de' Medici, the "Sultan of Jerusalem", some "eastern empires" such as Persia, India, Prester John, "Constantine" (Byzantium, showing the arms of the Latin Empire), Cathay (China), Scotland, Aragon, Denmark, Sweden, Norway, Iceland, Poland, Antiochia, Ethiopia, Salerno, Castilia, Troy, Nebuchadnezzar, Nero.

After this preface, the book begins a more realistic listing of the heraldry of its time, beginning on fol. 20v, organized as follows: The arms of the territories and noble families of the kingdom of Spain, of the high nobility of the Holy Roman Empire, Burgundy, Savoy, Milan and Naples (ff. 20-29); the higher nobility of the Holy Roman Empire in the duchies of Kleve, Geldern, Liegnitz, Werdenberg, Württemberg, the Habsburg territories, and the arms of various counts (foll. 29-85). This is followed by the arms of lower nobility and certain notable bourgeois families (foll. 86-255) and the arms of imperial cities (foll. 257-262).

== Gallery ==
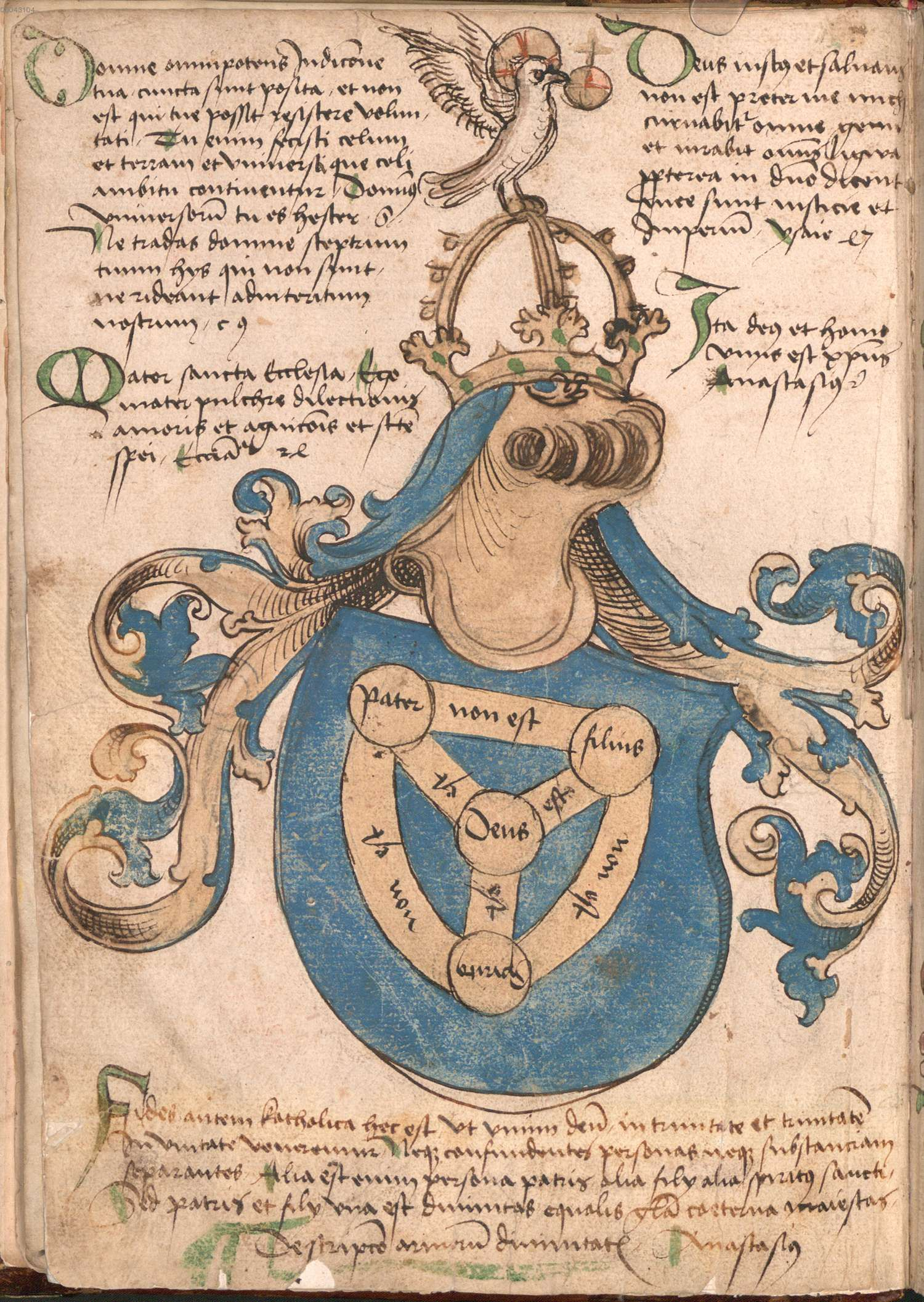
Fol. 1v: Attributed arms of God, with the Shield of the Trinity and dove crest

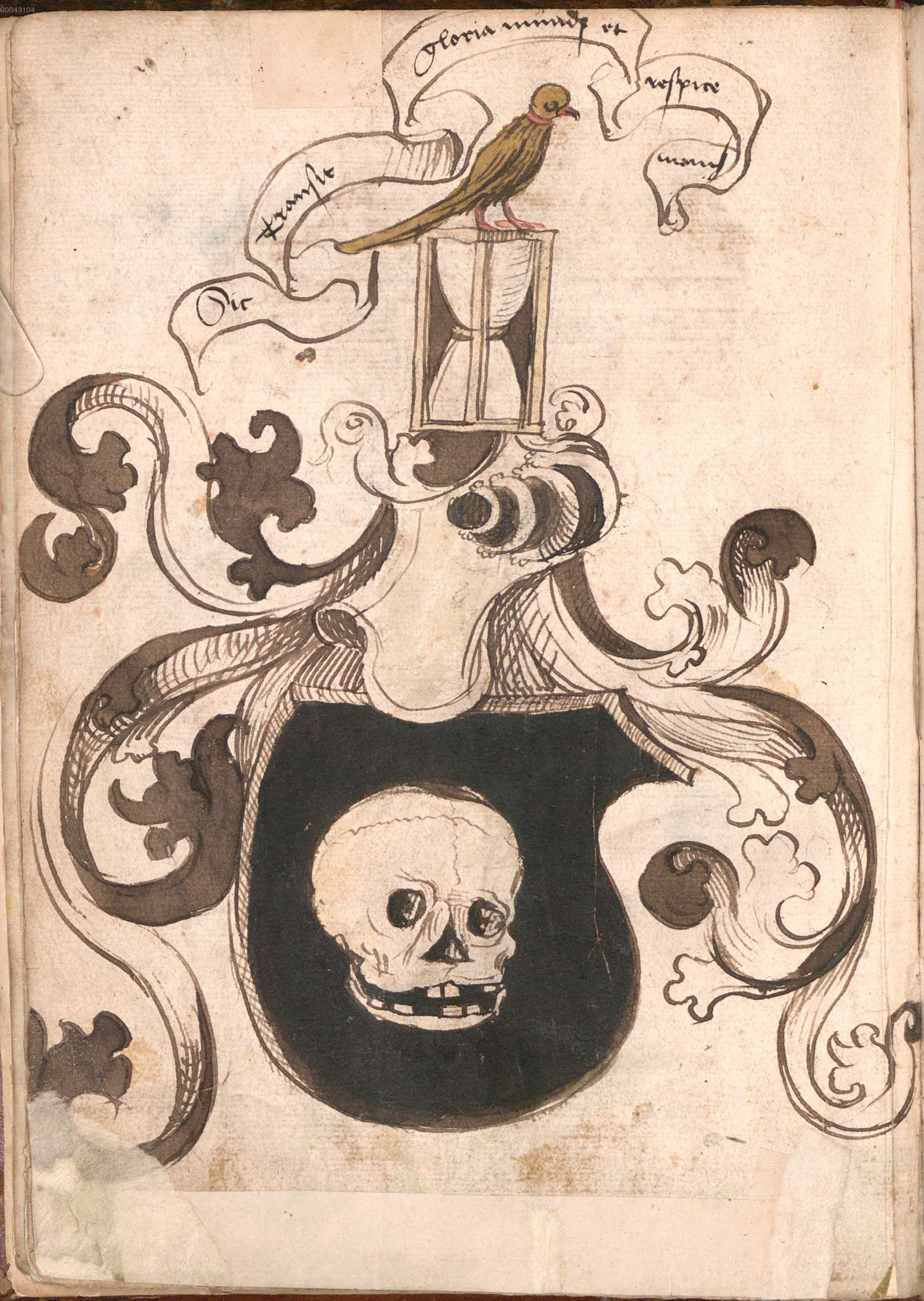
Fol. 3v: Attributed arms of Death, with the motto sic transit gloria mundi et respice manus

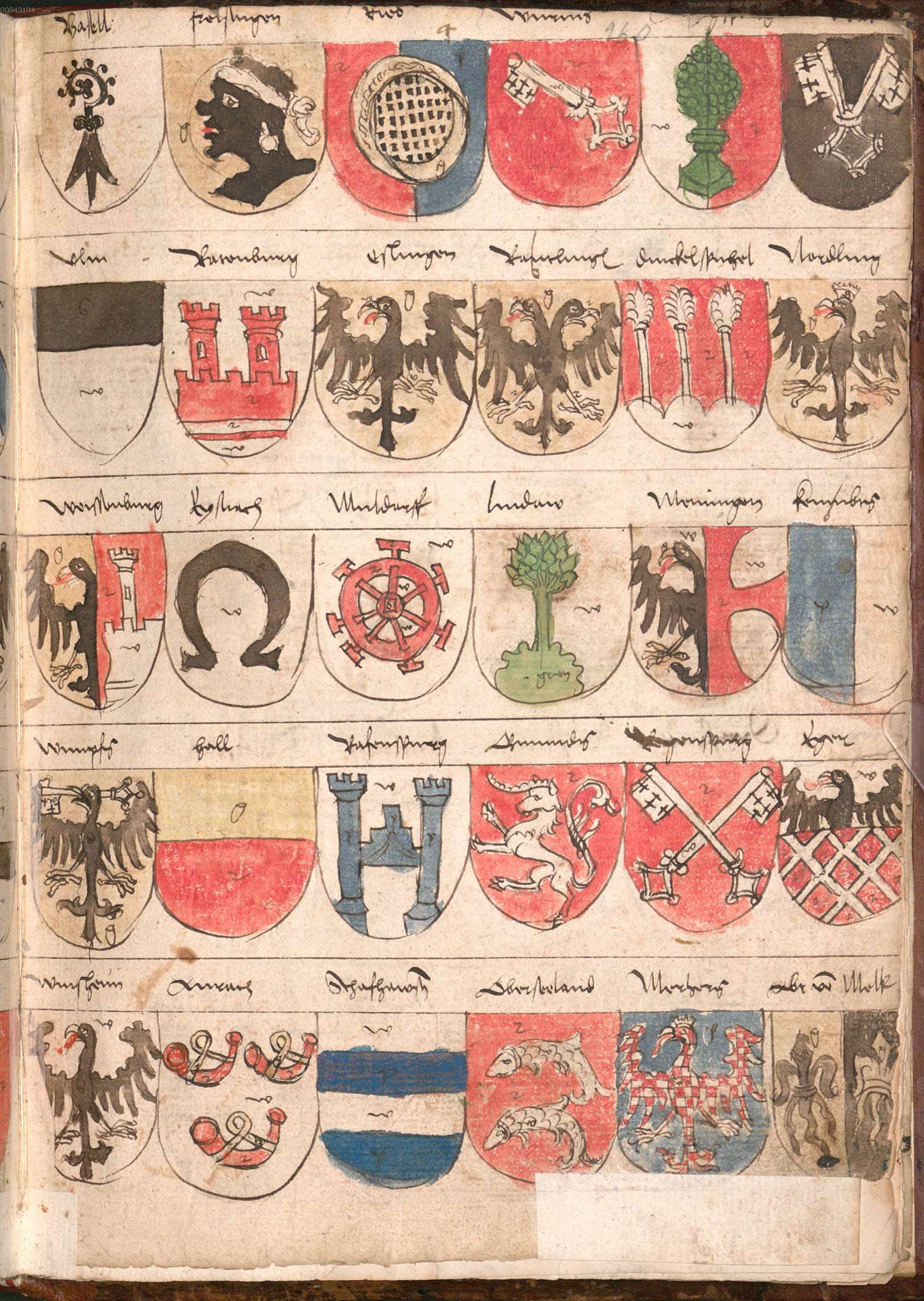
Fol. 260r displays thirty coats of arms

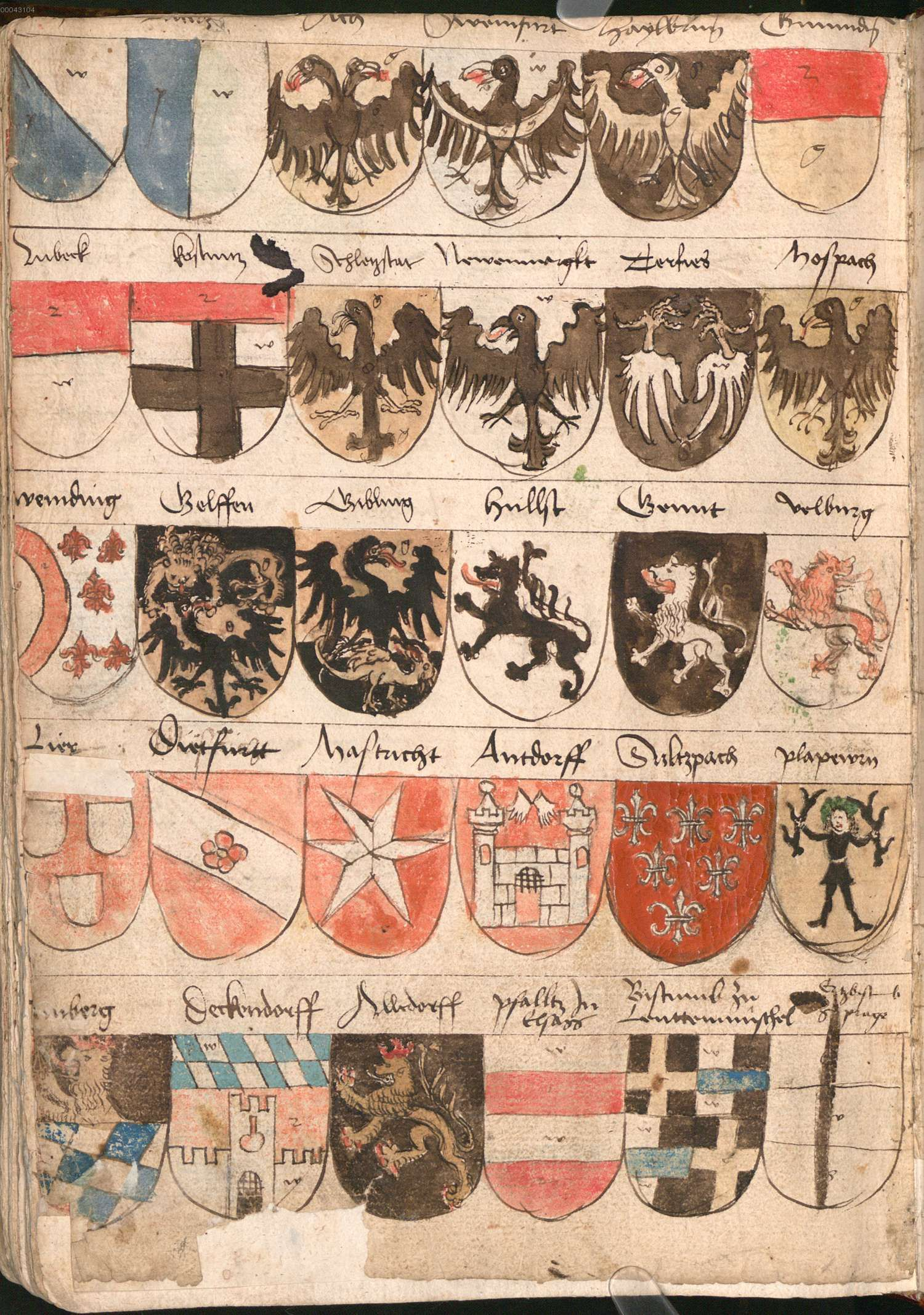
Fol. 260v displays thirty coats of arms
