= Hyghalmen Roll =

15th-century German roll of arms

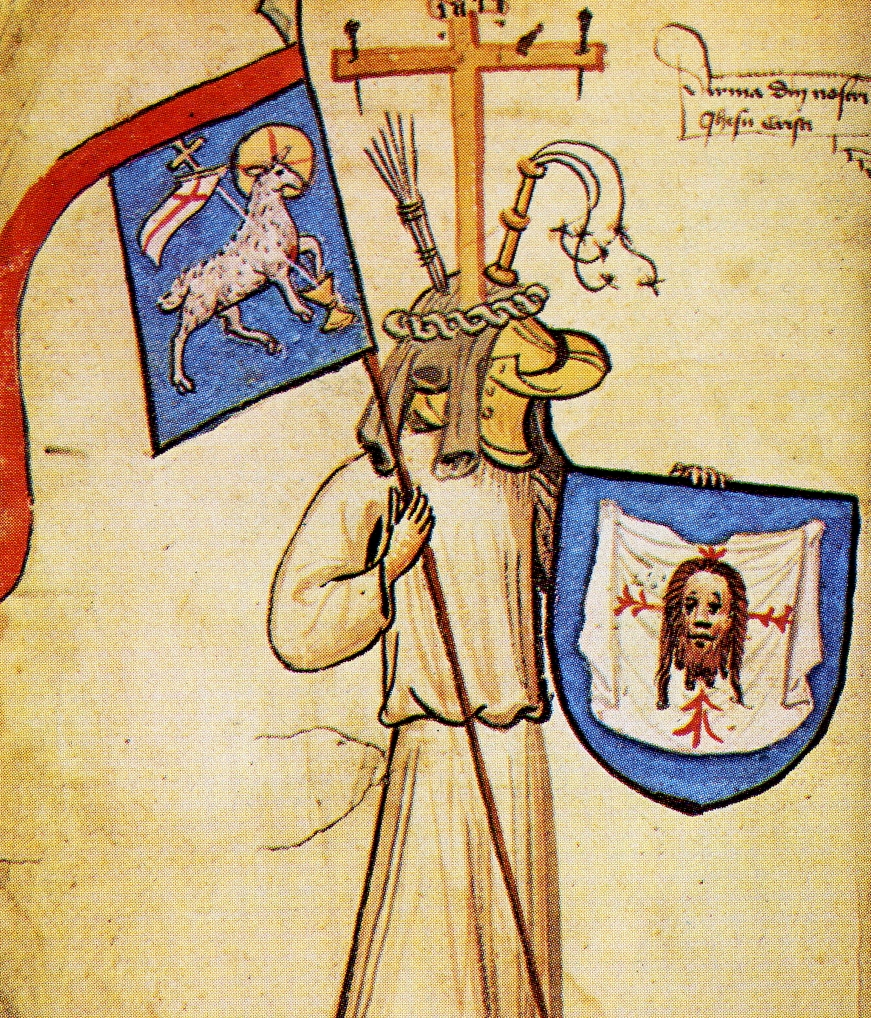
Illustration of arms attributed to Jesus, with a schwenkel on a banner

The Hyghalmen Roll is a roll of arms kept at the English College of Arms in London (1st MS. 5). It was made c. 1447–1455 in Cologne, Germany. Some images show characteristics of German heraldry, such as repeating themes in the coat of arms and crest, and the long schwenkel on banners. The latter was omitted from the attributed arms of Jesus when the images were copied into Randle Holme's Book (c. 1464–1480).
