= Parætonium =

Parætonium is a Roman Catholic titular bishopric in the former Roman provinces of Libya Secunda and Marmarica, suffragan of Darnis.

== Overview ==
This city, (today Mersa Matruh) which some claim should be called Ammonia, owed its celebrity to its port, whence Alexander the Great visited the oracle of Ammon. Mark Antony stopped there before Actium.

The Byzantine Emperor Justinian fortified it to protect Egypt on the west.

It has since disappeared and the port is partially covered with sand; the site, long called by the Arabs Baretoun, under Ottoman rule was named Mirsa Berek, in the vilayet (province) of Benghazi (Tripolitana).

Mention is made of three bishops: Titus, present at the First Council of Nicaea, 325; Siras, an Arian; and his successor Gaius, who assisted at the Council of Alexandria, 362 (Le Quien, Oriens christianus, II, 631).
