= Councils of Alexandria =

The Councils of Alexandria started in 231 AD as a council of bishops and priests met at Alexandria, Egypt, called by Bishop Demetrius for the purpose of declaring Origen of Alexandria unworthy of the office of teacher, and of excommunicating him.

== Council of 306 ==
In 306, a council held under Pope Peter of Alexandria deposed Meletius, Bishop of Lycopolis, for idolatry and other crimes. The schism then begun by him lasted fifty years and was the source of much trouble for the Church of Egypt.

== Council of 321 ==
In 321, Alexander I of Alexandria held the council that first condemned Arius, then parish priest of the section of Alexandria known as Baucalis. After his condemnation Arius withdrew to Palestine, where he secured the powerful support of Eusebius of Nicomedia.

== Council of 326 ==
At the Council of 326, Athanasius of Alexandria was elected to succeed the aged Alexander, and various heresies and schisms of Egypt were denounced.

== Council of c. 340 ==
In a year between 338 and 340, nearly one hundred bishops met at Alexandria, where they declared in favor of Athanasius, rejecting the charges brought against him by the Eusebian faction at the First Synod of Tyre. The council published an encyclical to this effect.

== Council of 346 ==
In 346, Athanasius gathered 94 bishops to hold a council, where they signed the Serdican encyclical.

== Council of 350 ==
At a council in the year 350, Athanasius was replaced in his see.

== Council of 362 ==
After the death of George of Cappadocia, Athanasius returned to the see of Alexandria, and shortly thereafter called the council of 362. This council was a major turning point in the conflict with the Arian movement over issues regarding the Trinity, the Holy Spirit, the human soul of Christ, and God's divinity. Athanasius and Eusebius of Vercelli presided over the council, and Athanasius read his Apologia de Fuga aloud to the attendees, who included some Marmaricans.

Mild measures were agreed on for those apostate bishops who repented, but severe penance was decreed for the chief leaders of the major heresies. The council published two documents, the Epistula Catholica and the Tomus ad Antiochenos.

== Council of 363 ==
In 363, another council met under Athanasius for the purpose of submitting to the new Roman Emperor Jovian an account of the truth faith.

== Council of 364 ==
The council of 364 had a similar purpose to the council of 363.

== Council of 370 ==
The council of 370 approved the action of Pope Damasus I in condemning Ursacius of Singidunum and Valens of Mursa (see Arianism), and expressed its surprise that Auxentius of Milan was yet tolerated at Milan.

== Council of 399 ==
In 399, the council of Alexandria condemned, without naming him, the writings of Origen.

== Council of 430 ==
In 430, Cyril of Alexandria made known to the bishops of Egypt the letter of Pope Celestine I, in which a pontifical admonition was conveyed to the heresiarch Nestorius. In this council the bishops warned him that unless he retracted his errors, confessed the Catholic faith, and reformed his life, they would refuse to look on him as a bishop.

== Council of 633 ==
In 633, the patriarch Cyrus of Alexandria held a council in favour of the Monothelites, with which closed the series of these deliberative meetings of the ancient Church of Egypt.
