= Shield of the Trinity =

Visual symbol expressing the Christian Trinity

Basic "Shield of the Trinity" diagram

The Shield of the Trinity or Scutum Fidei (Latin for 'shield of faith') is a traditional Christian visual symbol which expresses many aspects of the doctrine of the Trinity, summarizing the first part of the Athanasian Creed in a compact diagram. In late medieval Europe, this emblem was considered to be the heraldic arms of God, and of the Trinity.

== Description ==
This diagram consists of four nodes, generally circular in shape, interconnected by six links. The three nodes at the edge of the diagram are labelled with the names of the three persons of the Trinity, traditionally the Latin-language names, or scribal abbreviations thereof: The Father (PATER), The Son (FILIUS), and The Holy Spirit (SPIRITUS SANCTUS).

The node in the center of the diagram, within the triangle formed by the other three nodes, is labelled God (Latin DEUS). The three links connecting the center node with the outer nodes are labelled is (Latin EST). The three links connecting the outer nodes to each other are labelled is not (Latin NON EST).

The links are non-directional—this is emphasized in one thirteenth-century manuscript by writing the link captions EST or NON EST twice as many times, going in both directions within each link. It is shown in some modern versions of the diagram by superimposing each occurrence of the is / is not text on a double-headed arrow ↔ rather than enclosing it within a link. So the following twelve propositions can be read off the diagram:

- "Father is God"
- "Son is God"
- "Holy Spirit is God"
- "God is Father"
- "God is Son"
- "God is Holy Spirit"
- "Father is not Son"
- "Father is not Holy Spirit"
- "Son is not Father"
- "Son is not Holy Spirit"
- "Holy Spirit is not Father"
- "Holy Spirit is not Son"

The Shield of the Trinity is not generally intended to be any kind of schematic diagram of the structure of God, but instead is merely a compact visual device from which the above statements, contained in or implied by the Athanasian Creed can be read off.

== History ==
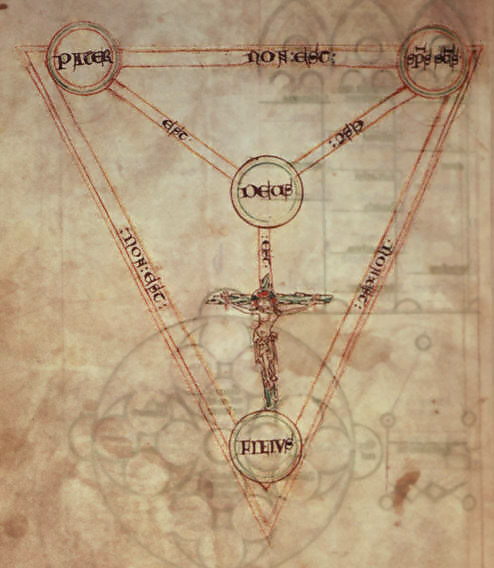
The earliest attested version of the diagram, from a manuscript of Peter of Poitiers' writings, c. 1210

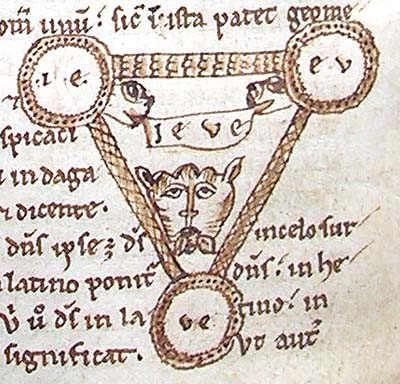
Petrus Alfonsi's early 12th-century Tetragrammaton-Trinity diagram, a probable precursor to the Shield of the Trinity

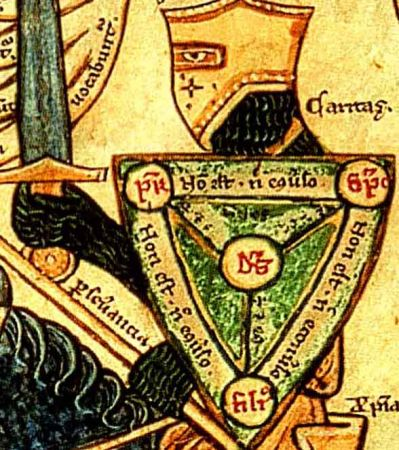
From William Peraldus' Summa Vitiorum, c. 1255–1265. Includes e converso 'vice versa' in the link captions to clarify that links are bidirectional.

The precise origin of this diagram is unknown, but it was evidently influenced by 12th-century experiments in symbolizing the Trinity in abstract visual form—mainly by Petrus Alfonsi's Tetragrammaton-Trinity diagram of c. 1109, and possibly also by Joachim of Fiore's different Tetragrammaton-Trinity diagram of three circles, which led to the Borromean rings being used as a symbol of the Trinity, in combination with the Athanasian Creed.

The Shield of the Trinity diagram is attested from as early as a c. 1208–1216 manuscript of Peter of Poitiers' Compendium Historiae in Genealogia Christi. The period of its most widespread use was during the 15th and 16th centuries, when it is in found in a number of English and French manuscripts and books (such as the Sherborne Missal), and as part of stained-glass windows and ornamental carvings in a number of churches, many in East Anglia.

The diagram was used heraldically from the mid-13th century, when a shield-shaped version of the diagram, not actually placed on a shield, was included among the c. 1250 heraldic shields in Matthew Paris' Chronica Majora. The c. 1260 allegorical illustrations of a knight battling the seven deadly sins in a manuscript of William Peraldus' Summa Vitiorum, and of a woman penitent fending off diabolical attacks in the De Quincy Apocalypse, show the diagram placed on a shield. In the 15th century, one form of the Shield of the Trinity was considered to be the coat of arms of God, see discussion below.

The use of the diagram declined in England with the rise of Protestantism. From the 17th century to the early 19th century, it was mainly of interest to historians of heraldry. Beginning in the 19th century it underwent a limited revival as an actively used Christian symbol among English-speaking Christians, partly due to being included in books such as the 1865 Handbook of Christian Symbolism by William James Audsley and George Ashdown Audsley.

== Name ==
The only name for this diagram which was in any regular use during the Middle Ages was Scutum Fidei, a Latin phrase meaning 'Shield of the Faith', taken from the Vulgate of Ephesians verse 6:16. For example, in this c. 1247–1258 manuscript of John of Wallingford's writings, the quote from Ephesians 6:16 is placed directly above the diagram.

The particular phrase Shield of the Trinity, which is now the most common name for the diagram in English, came into regular use in the 20th century. It is called in Latin Scutum Sancte Trinitatis or 'Shield of the Holy Trinity' (where sancte is a medieval form for more classical sanctae) on the font in Crosthwaite Church, near Keswick, Cumbria, England. Other variant names are Arms of the Trinity, Shield of the Blessed Trinity, Emblem of the Trinity, Arms of the Faith, Emblem of the Holy and Undivided Trinity, etc.

== Variations ==
Some variations of the Shield of the Trinity diagram are shown in the image below:

Four variants of the Shield of the Trinity

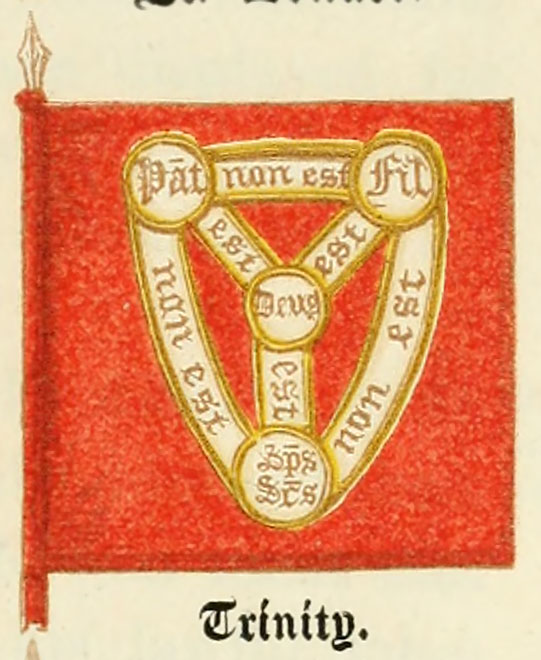
An 1833 reconstruction of the Agincourt banner of the Trinity

A shield-shaped version of the diagram placed on a red shield (heraldic gules) was attributed as the arms of God (and of the Trinity) by heralds in 15th-century England and France. The "banner of the Trinity" which Jean Le Fevre, Seigneur of St. Remy, and Jehan de Wavrin attest that Henry V of England displayed at Agincourt would have been the same, but with the emblem on a red flag instead of a red shield. This coat of arms was given the following heraldic blazon in "On Sacred Heraldry" by E.L. Blackburne, attached as Appendix II to Emblems of the Saints, By which they are Distinguished in Works of Art by F. C. Husenbeth, edited by Augustus Jessopp, 3rd.ed. 1882:

Gules, an orle and pall Argent, conjoined and surmounted of four plates, occupying the dexter and sinister chief and the base and fess points respectively; the first inscribed "Pater", the second "Filius", and the third "Spiritus Sanctus", the centre "Deus"; the connecting portions of the orle between them having the words "non est", and those of the pall "est".

The diagram on a blue shield (heraldic azure) was the coat of arms of the Priory of Black Canons (monastery of Christ Church) near Aldgate in the City of London. See also the 15th-century coat of arms attributed to St. Michael the Archangel and the modern coat of arms of the Anglican diocese of Trinidad shown below. Two of the 13th-century manuscripts have the diagram on a green shield (heraldic vert), which is also found in the coat of arms of Trinity Parish, Jersey shown below. Green is the color of Trinity Sunday or the Trinity liturgical season in some traditions.

Other variant forms of the diagram have the lettering on nodes and links with a golden background color (instead of silver), since gold (heraldic or) is the other heraldic metal. So the arms attributed to St. Faith in late medieval England consist of a diagram with lettering on yellow, placed on a red or blue shield, while the parish of the Forest, Guernsey uses a diagram with lettering on silver or golden nodes and links, placed on a green shield.

In the Middle Ages, the shield-shaped version of the diagram was sometimes imagined as a protective shield wielded by the Archangel Michael, or by an ordinary soul, in the spiritual warfare against dark forces described in Ephesians chapter 6, as in the c. 1260 allegorical illustrations in manuscripts of Peraldus' Summa Vitiorum and the De Quincy Apocalypse.

A symmetrical rounded form of the diagram with one vertex up and two down was popularized in the modern period by the Audsleys' Handbook of Christian Symbolism. This rounded form also occurs with one vertex down and two up. The outer node captions can be reduced to simple initials ("P", "F", and "SS"). On the coat of arms of Trinity Parish, Jersey shown below, all four node captions are reduced to single initials. In some late medieval English church decorations (such as the bench end at Holy Trinity church, Blythburgh, Suffolk and the font at St John the Baptist church, Butley, Suffolk) the four connected circles are intended as a symbol of the Trinity even when all text is omitted.

Many further slight artistic variations can occur in the relative sizes of nodes and links, their exact placement, in lettering styles, in further decorative elaboration, etc. Occasionally one or more of the outer nodes is drawn as a non-circular shape to fit within a space allotted.

The diagram can be color-coded in order to bring out the interrelationships between its elements more clearly. In the version included above, the positive or asserting parts of the diagram are shown in black, while the negative or denying parts of the diagram are in red. This is similar to the version of the Shield of the Trinity present in a 15th-century stained glass window in St. Peter and St. Paul church, Fressingfield, Suffolk, England, where only the positive or asserting parts of the diagram are shown—see link below.

A version of the diagram with translated English-language captions is shown in the illustration above. For simplicity, the definite article could also be left out of the English translations of the outer node captions, as in the next illustration below. In the Middle Ages, Latin was the liturgical language and main language of scholarship of Western Europe, so that Latin captions were then most often used. At least one old rendition of the diagram in another language is attested in the c. 1260 Anglo-Norman French allegorical illustration in the De Quincy Apocalypse.

=== Orientation of diagram, and placement of outer node captions ===
As the First Person of the Trinity, the Father is always in the most honorable position in the diagram. So in the form of the diagram with one vertex down, the caption PATER or Father is always placed in the top left node, which is heraldically in dexter chief, i.e. top right when considered from the point of view of someone holding the shield from behind. In the form of the diagram with one vertex up, the caption PATER or Father is always placed in the topmost node. The placement of the captions FILIUS or Son and SPIRITUS SANCTUS or Holy Spirit in the remaining two outer nodes can vary.

In the 13th-century versions of the diagram, the caption FILIUS is placed in the bottom node. Often a cross is drawn in the link between the center node and the bottom node, in order to symbolize the idea that the Second Person of the Trinity entered into the world (or that "The Word was made flesh", as is stated in a Latin annotation on the diagram included in Matthew Paris' Chronica Majora which quotes from the Vulgate of John verse 1:14). When this form of the Shield of the Trinity diagram with one vertex down is used after the 13th century, the Son is much more often placed in the top right node, and the Holy Spirit in the bottom node (as shown in the illustrations above).

The diagram below shows the earliest and most recent major variants of the Shield of the Trinity diagram: On the left, the form attested in various manuscripts c. 1208–1260 AD, and on the right the form popularized among some English-speaking Protestants in recent years by Paul P. Enns' 1989 book The Moody Handbook of Theology and H. Wayne House's 1992 book Charts of Christian Theology and Doctrine. Note that in the 13th-century manuscripts, the cross is often drawn as a detailed artistic illumination of Christ on the cross, which is not attempted here.

The earliest and most recent major variations of the Shield of the Trinity diagram

A few authors of 20th-century books on Christian symbolism (such as Edward N. West in Outward Signs: The Language of Christian Symbolism, 1989) have been of the opinion that the form of the diagram with one vertex down and the captions PATER and FILIUS in the two top nodes is more appropriate for Western Christianity with its Filioque. The form of the diagram with one vertex up represents more closely the doctrine of the Trinity in Eastern Christianity (without the Filioque)—though this hyper-refined interpretation does not agree with 13th-century usage, nor with the use of versions of the diagram with one vertex up by modern Catholics and Protestants.

== Links to depictions of the Shield of the Trinity diagram ==
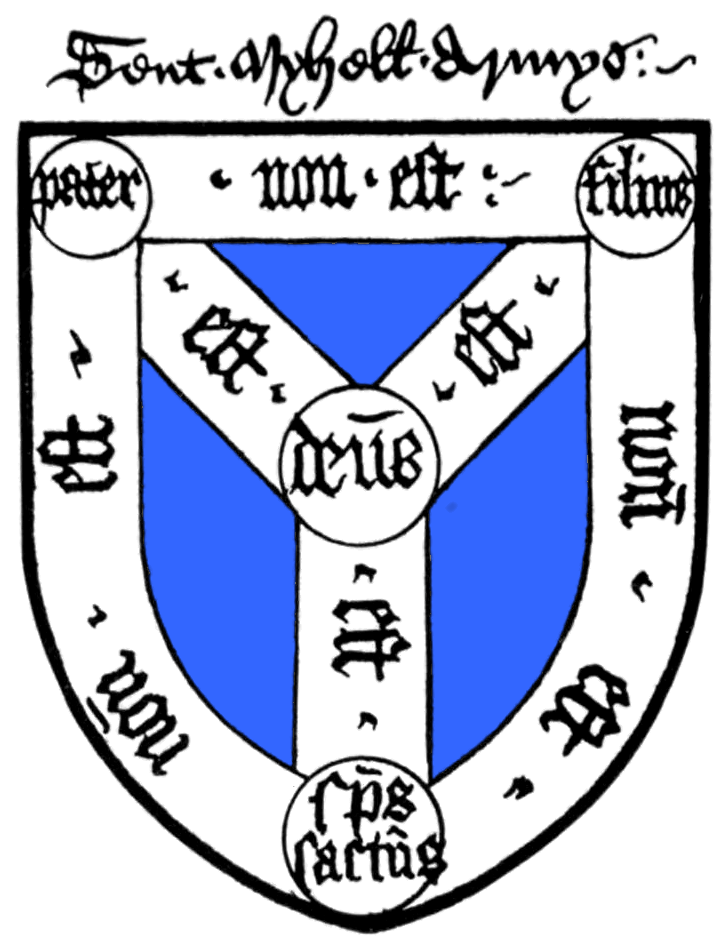
Arms attributed to St. Michael in the 15th century

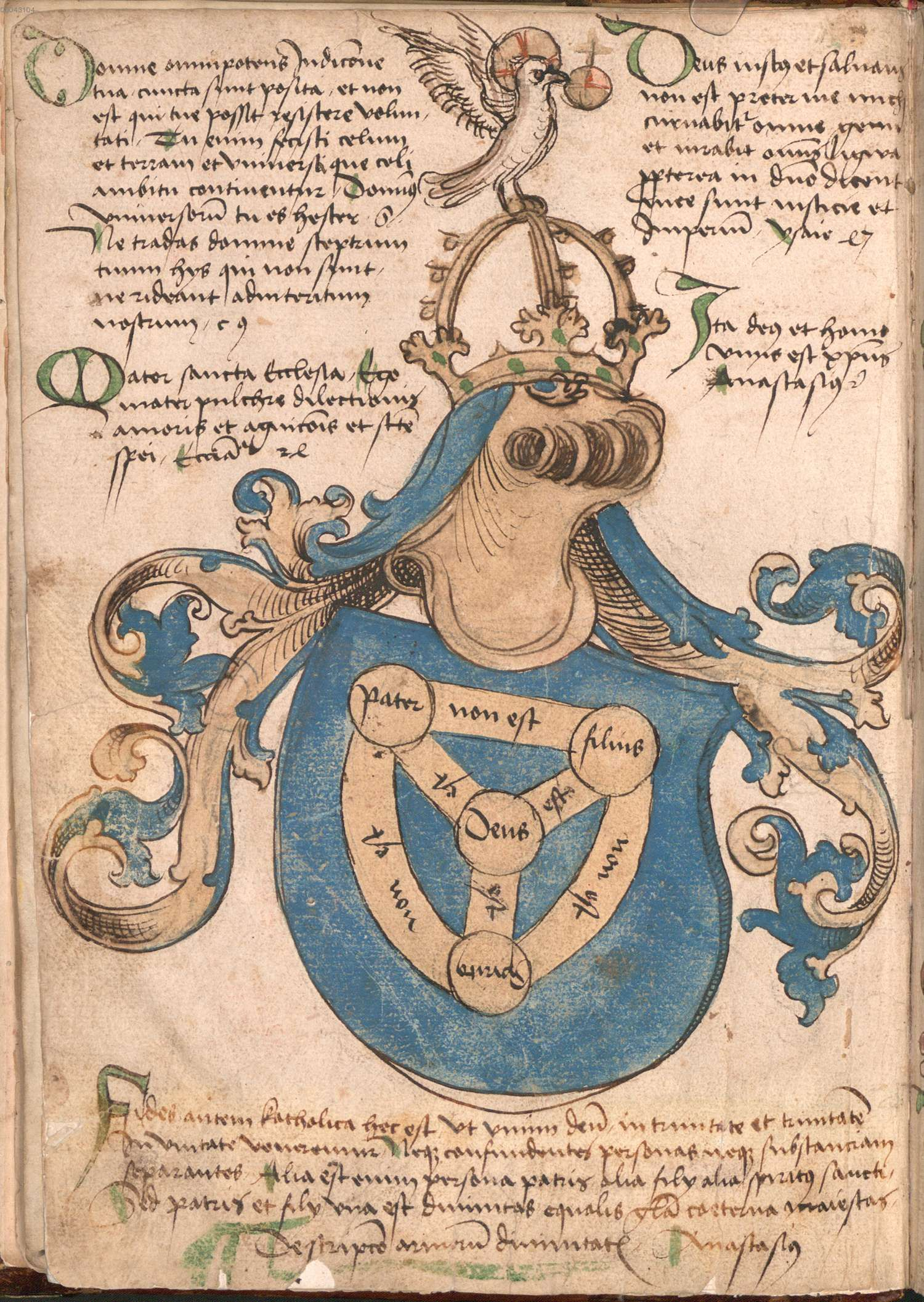
A full "coat of arms of God" in the Wernigerode Armorial, Southern Germany, c. 1490, with blue shield color, instead of the red used for the coat of arms of God in England

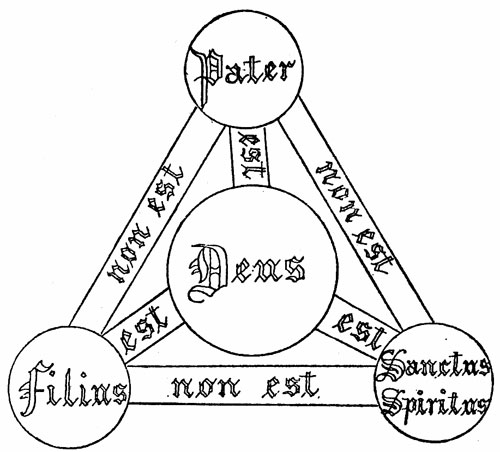
Triangular form of the diagram with one vertex up, as found in an 1896 book

The modern coat of arms of the Anglican diocese of Trinidad

Coat of arms of Trinity Parish, Jersey, Channel Islands

=== 13th-century manuscripts ===
- C. 1208–1216 manuscript of Compendium Historiae in Genealogia Christi by Peter of Poitiers (Petrus Pictavensis) — Cotton Faustina B. VII folio 42v
- C. 1230 manuscript of Robert Grosseteste's writings — Durham Cathedral manuscript A.III.12, f. 14v
- C. 1255–1265 manuscript of Summa Vitiorum or "A Treatise on the Vices" by William Peraldus — Harley 3244 folios 27–28
- The diagrams in Matthew Paris' Chronica Majora and the De Quincy Apocalypse (Lambeth palace ms. 209, folio 53r) are not online, but are shown in the Michael Evans journal article. A full-page color reproduction of the Lambeth Apocalypse illustration is on page 48 of the Rodney Dennys book.

=== 15th- or 16th-century manuscripts and books ===
- "Scutum fidei Christianae" diagram of Jerome of Prague
- Redrawn version of illustration from a Book of Hours printed by Simon Vostre in Paris in 1524 (also reproduced in vol. 2 of Didron's 1843 Christian Iconography).
- A redrawn version of the arms of the monastery of Christ Church, London can be seen as part of the on-line version of the 1894 book A Glossary of Terms Used in Heraldry by James Parker.

=== 15th- or 16th-century church decorations ===
- Depiction by 16th-century Spanish artist Jerónimo Cosida
- Stained-glass window at St. Peter and St. Paul, Salle, Norfolk, England
- Font at St. Martin, Nacton, Suffolk, England
- Carved baptismal font without text at St Michael's Church, Framlingham
- Stained glass window at St. Peter and St. Paul, Fressingfield, Suffolk, England (shows only the "positive" parts of the diagram, as discussed above)
- Font at St. John the Baptist, Butley, Suffolk, England
- Inscription at Holy Trinity, Blythburgh, Suffolk, England
- Textless carving at All Saints, Wighton, Norfolk, England
- Photographs of stained-glass windows on Flickr:
  - St. Peter and St. Paul, Salle, Norfolk
    - (alternate photo)
  - All Saints' church, Cambridge
  - Allington, Lincolnshire
  - St Peter Mancroft, Norwich
  - Holy Cross Church, Gilling East, Yorkshire
  - St. Andrew's Church, Greystoke Cumbria
  - Sedgeford, Norfolk
  - Holy Trinity Church, Long Melford, Suffolk

=== Some modern church decorations ===
- Holy Trinity church, Bottisham, Cambridgeshire (pulpit decoration, shield-shaped diagram on red shield)
- St Mary, Sedgeford, Norfolk (stained glass window)
- Saint-Maurice-des-Champs, Lille. France (floor inlay)
- Grace Episcopal Church, Decorah, Iowa (stained glass window)
- Saint Brigid Church, Dublin, Ohio (stained glass window)
- St Peter's, Strumpshaw, Norfolk (stained glass window)
- St Swithin's, Bintree, Norfolk (stained glass window)
- Holy Trinity Church, Leicester (stained glass window)
- Holy Trinity, Hurstpierpoint, Sussex (ceiling decoration)
- Christ Church cathedral, Dublin (ceiling boss)
- St Mary the Virgin, Bromfield, Shropshire (ceiling, one of the few 17th-century uses of the diagram, without nodes)
- Design in 1891 book
- Church of the Saviour (United Methodist), Cleveland Heights, Ohio (lectern with diagram engraved in its center)
- Circular diagram on stained-glass window — St Oswald's, Sowerby, North Yorkshire
- Embroidered church decoration (with decorative outer "Sanctus" circle) — Mary Magdalene, Lincoln
- Stained glass window with trefoil nodes — St Andrew's Church, Wissett, Suffolk
- Stained-glass window — St Andrew, Newcastle
- Stained-glass window — St Andrew, Newcastle
- Stained-glass window — Holy Trinity, Brathay, Cumbria
- Stained-glass window — All Saints, Longstanton, Cambridge
- Stained-glass window — Waltham Abbey
- Stained glass window of Shield of Trinity diagram as symbol of the Athanasian Creed — Messiah Evangelical Lutheran Church, Sterling, Illinois
- Floor decoration — Our Savior's Lutheran Church in Port Orange, Florida (for artist's draft of design, see here)
- Stained glass window of diagram in circular form — Holy Trinity, Avon, Ohio
- Stone bas-relief on the chapel wall of Howard Hall.
