= Schwenkel =

15th-century German roll of arms

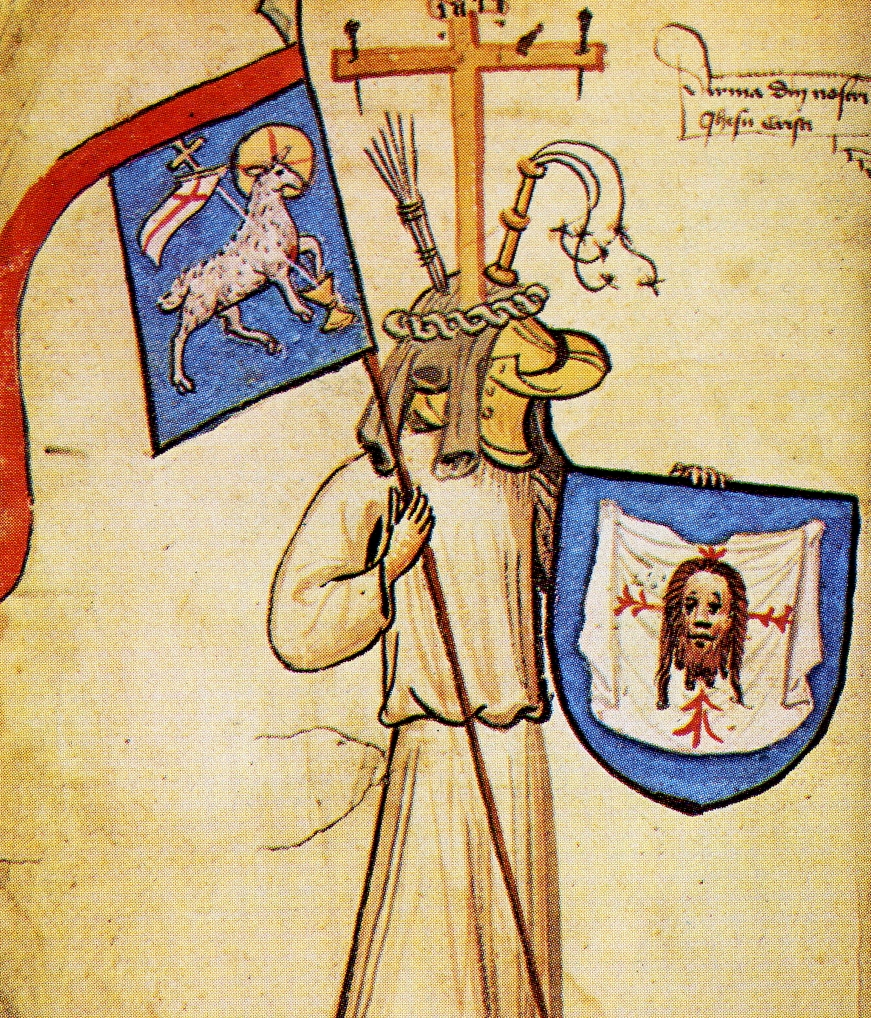
Illustration of arms attributed to Jesus, with a schwenkel on a banner

In vexillology, a schwenkel is a type of flag accessory that was used in medieval heraldry. It consists of a long, narrow strip of cloth, usually of a different color than the main flag, that hangs from the upper corner of the flagstaff. The schwenkel was often decorated with fringes, tassels, or other ornaments.

The origin and purpose of the schwenkel are not clear, but some historians suggest that it was derived from the streamers or pennons that were attached to lances or banners in battle. The schwenkel may have served as a distinctive mark of rank or honor for certain nobles or military commanders, or as a sign of allegiance or loyalty to a particular lord or sovereign.

The schwenkel was most commonly used in the German-speaking regions of Europe, especially by the Holy Roman Empire and its various states. The schwenkel was also adopted by some Scandinavian and Baltic countries, such as Denmark, Sweden, and Livonia. The schwenkel was usually displayed on the dexter (right) side of the flag, but sometimes on the sinister (left) side, depending on the local custom or preference.

The schwenkel was not a fixed or standardized element of heraldry, but rather a variable and optional one. The shape, size, color, and number of schwenkels could vary according to the design of the flag or the choice of the bearer. Some flags had only one schwenkel, while others had two or more. Some schwenkels were plain, while others were charged with symbols or letters. Some schwenkels were attached to the flag by a cord or a ring, while others were sewn directly to the fabric.

The schwenkel was a distinctive and decorative feature of heraldic flags, but it also had some practical advantages. The schwenkel helped to keep the flag displayed and visible in the wind, and it also added some weight and balance to the flagstaff. The schwenkel also made the flag more recognizable and identifiable from a distance, especially when the main field of the flag was of a common or simple color.

The schwenkel was used until the late 18th or early 19th century, when it gradually fell out of fashion and was replaced by more modern and standardized flag designs. However, the schwenkel still survives in some historical or ceremonial flags, such as the banner of the Holy Roman Emperor or the flag of the Livonian Order. The schwenkel is also a heraldic charge that can appear in coats of arms, either as a representation of a flag or as a symbol of a historical or personal connection to a flag bearer.
