= Zeitschrift für Kirchengeschichte =

- Discipline: History, theology
- Language: German and English
- Edited by: Johannes Helmrath, Marika Bacsóka, Franz Xaver Bischof

Publication details
- History: Since 1877
- Publisher: Kohlhammer Verlag
- Frequency: 3 issues per year

Standard abbreviations
- ISO 4: Z. Kirchengesch.

Indexing
- ISSN: 0044-2925 (print); 3053-7606 (web)

Links
- Journal homepage

The Zeitschrift für Kirchengeschichte (Journal of Church History) is an academic journal that deals with topics in church history.

The Zeitschrift für Kirchengeschichte was founded in 1877 by the church historians and theologians Albrecht Ritschl, Theodor Brieger, Wilhelm Gass, and Hermann Reuter; new series (known as "volumes") have been launched four times. The journal is published by Kohlhammer Verlag in three issues per year and is housed within the publisher's Theology Editorial Department. Previous publishers were Klotz and Perthes in Gotha. The publishing body is the Section for Church History of the Verband der Historiker und Historikerinnen Deutschlands (German Historian Association).

The editorial board currently (as of 2016) consists of Franz Xaver Bischof, Irene Dingel, Johannes Helmrath, Jochen-Christoph Kaiser, Volker Leppin, Klaus Unterburger, Ulrich Volp, and Manfred Weitlauff. Previous editors have included Wolfgang Bienert, Andreas Holzem, Joachim Mehlhausen, Heiko A. Oberman, Rudolf Reinhardt, Wilhelm Schneemelcher, Georg Schwaiger, Erich Meuthen, Knut Schäferdiek, and Karl Heinz zur Mühlen.

In addition to articles, the journal publishes reviews in German and English. The editorial offices for the journal's article section are currently located at Ulrich Volp's Chair of Church and Dogmatic History at the Johannes Gutenberg University Mainz, and for the reviews at Franz Xaver Bischof’s Chair of Church History at LMU Munich.

== Editions ==
- 1st Series: 1877–1918 (Volumes 1–37)
- 2nd Series: 1920–1930 (Volumes 1–10 = Volumes 38–49)
- 3rd Series: 1931–1943 (Volumes 1–13 = Volumes 50–62)
- 4th Series: from 1950 (Volume 1 = Volume 63; Volumes 7 and 11 were incorrectly designated as Volumes 6 and 10)
