= Tomus ad Antiochenos =

Mediation proposal by Athanasius, 362

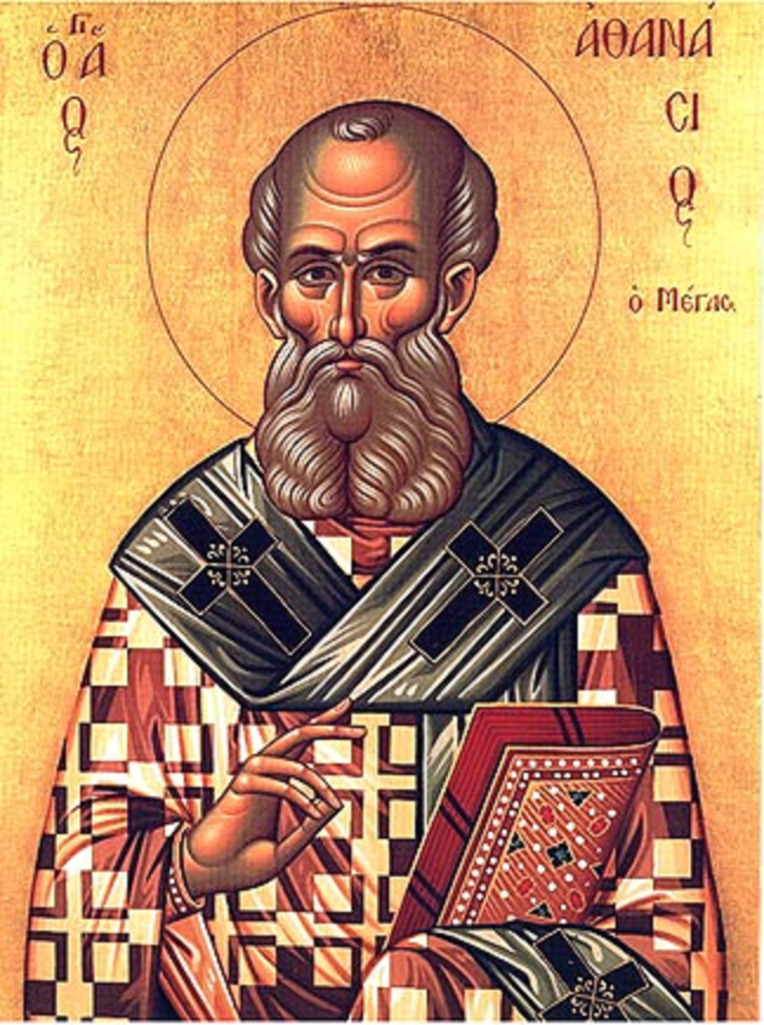
Image of Athanasius of Alexandria on an icon

Tomus ad Antiochenos is a letter or mediation proposal written by Bishop Athanasius of Alexandria on behalf of a regional synod he convened in Alexandria in 362, addressed to a group of bishops seeking a solution to the schism between "Eustathians" and "Meletians" in the parishes of Antioch. This letter played a key role in the Trinitarian theological debates between the one-hypostasis model and the three-hypostasis model of the Trinity, anticipating the turning point in this question from the 370s onward.

The central concern is to achieve theological agreement based on the Nicene Creed. By recognizing that certain theological points of contention in the Arian controversy were based not only on differences of belief, but also on different language rules or conceptual differences between Latin and Greek, the Tomus paved the way for the Trinitarian theological language rules of the three Cappadocians from the 370s onward: Basil of Caesarea, his brother Gregory of Nyssa, and their mutual friend Gregory of Nazianzus subsequently established the concept of the one being (Ousia) and the three hypostases of God, which became binding with the decision of the First Council of Constantinople in 381.

== Church and dogmatic historical context ==
=== Theological debates on the constellation of the Trinity ===
The background of the Tomus ad Antiochenos is the controversy about the Trinity, traditionally known as the "Arian" controversy, and in today's dogmatic historiography also as the "Trinitarian" or "subordinating dispute" The opponents agreed that the Logos was incarnate in Jesus Christ. However, the question of how to understand the relationship of this Logos to God, the relationship of the Son to the Father, was particularly controversial. The Council of Nicaea in 325 had condemned the Arian doctrine that the Son or Logos was not truly God, but a creature (albeit the first and highest creature) of God and had a beginning. But two points in particular sparked decades of controversy almost immediately after the council:

1. The anathematisms attached to the Nicene Creed condemned as heretics those who claimed that the Son was of a different hypostasis or being (Ousia) from the Father. This contradicted the understanding of the Trinity that was then widespread in the Greek-speaking east of the Roman Empire in the theological wake of Origen, according to which the Father, Son, and Holy Spirit were three distinct hypostases.
2. The Nicene statement that the Son was of the same nature (Homoousion) as the Father, which emphasized the unity of God, could be understood modalistically, which is why the formula had a theologically heretical effect on the "Origenist middle group" that dominated in the East. About 30 years later, from about 357, the moderate "Origenistic" Homooeusians finally emerged, who taught only the likeness of the Son to the Father "according to the Scriptures," but rejected a more precise definition of this likeness, since, for example, the nature of the Father and the Son is not discussed in the Scriptures. The radical Heterousians advocated the essential difference of the Son from the Father, and whose radicalism set in motion the dynamic of development.

== The Imperial political situation ==
Although Emperor Constantine had convened the Council of Nicaea and supported the Nicene Creed, especially the Homoousios formula, after 325 he advocated the reintegration of the Arians condemned at Nicaea in the interest of imperial peace. Uncompromising and energetic "anti-Arians" such as Athanasius and Marcellus of Ancyra stood in the way of his integration efforts.

Among Constantine's successors, it was above all Constantius II, the first emperor in the East and from 353 sole ruler of the entire empire, who sought new compromise formulas, distancing himself from the Nicene Confession, which led, among other things, to the banishment of the uncompromising Athanasius and the implementation of the so-called Homoousian imperial dogma in the early 360s. This confessional formula, which came about under imperial pressure and was little changed from the formulae of Nike and the fourth Sirmian formulae, also forbade the term "essence" (usia) and its use in connection with God the Father and his Son, as well as the term "hypostasis" and its Trinitarian theological use in connection with God the Father, his Son, and the Holy Spirit.

With the death of Constantius II in 361 and the rise to power of his cousin and rival Julian, church policy changed fundamentally: Julian sought to secure the unity of the empire by reintroducing the pagan state cult and left the church to its own devices, for unlike his predecessors, he had no interest in church unity. The Edict of Restitution of February 9, 362 lifted the banishments, including that of Athanasius, allowing him to return to Alexandria as bishop on February 21, 362.

=== Synod of 362 ===
Athanasius convened a synod in Alexandria in the spring or summer of 362 to discuss various issues. One of the issues discussed there was the Nicene Confession as the sole theological basis. Another was the mediation of the great ecclesiastical conflict at Antioch, specifically two of the three factions that had formed. On the one hand, there was a small community of followers of Bishop Eustathius of Antioch, who had been deposed in 327, around the deacon Paulinus, who, like Athanasius, taught the one essence and one hypostasis of God in the ancient Nicene Creed, and with whom Athanasius felt particularly connected. On the other hand, there was a larger community around Bishop Meletius, who held a Homoean creed and thus the Eastern Origenist doctrine of the three hypostases. An understanding with the third group around Bishop Euzoius, a close friend of Arius and representative of the Homoean imperial dogma, was out of the question from the beginning.

The Tomus ad Antiochenos itself was written after the synod. The Epistula catholica, written by Athanasius as the main author and at least one co-author, can be considered a circular letter of the synod.

=== Sender and addressees ===
The Tomus is a written mediation proposal by Athanasius on behalf of the participants in the Synod of Alexandria (362) to a five-member commission of bishops who were working to resolve the "Antiochian" or "Meletian" schism. The mediation proposal was to be read by the bishops to the communities in Antioch affected by the schism between the "Eustathians" and the "Meletians" for acclamation. Eusebius of Vercelli and Lucifer of Calaris, Cymatius of Paltus, Asterius of Petra, and Anatolius of Euboea, both otherwise unknown, are named (Tom pr., "Introduction"). The title Tomus ad Antiochenos is not entirely accurate; the letter was addressed only indirectly to the communities of Antioch through the episcopal commission. The title is therefore considered secondary.

Two of these bishops, Eusebius and Asterius, were themselves present at the Synod of Alexandria. This makes them not only addressees but also co-authors, the latter together with "Athanasius and all who were with him at Alexandria" (Tom 10,2). However, only Athanasius is attested as the author by tradition, for example, soon after his death by his successor Petros and by Apollinaris of Laodicea.

== Main topics ==
With particular reference to the situation in Antioch, the letter deals with the Christians' desire for peace, the unity of the Church and the rejection of Arianism, the Nicene Creed and its meaning and the question of whether it needs to be supplemented, the question of one or three hypostases in the doctrine of the Trinity, the human nature of Christ and the difficulties involved, and the divinity of the Holy Spirit.

=== Unity of the church ===
The Tomus begins with an appeal for the unity of the Church. Athanasius wanted to unite the old Nicenes, among whom he included Paulinus of Antioch and now himself, as well as the Homoean Origenists of the East, represented for example by the deposed bishop Meletius of Antioch, against the imperial dogma of the Homoeans, which was considered "Arian". For "many who were once separated from us because of their contentiousness now want to keep the peace" (Tom 1,1) - that is the Meletians.

Athanasius sees a common faith as a prerequisite for ecclesial unity: "and there must be a common mind." (Tom 1,3) Athanasius specifies the common basis of faith in three points: those who seek communion must "condemn the Arian heresy and confess the faith confessed by the holy fathers at Nicaea, but also condemn those who maintain that the Holy Spirit is a creature and separate from the nature of Christ". (Tom 3,1) So it is about the rejection of Arianism, the establishment of Nicaea as the common basis of faith, and the divinity of the Holy Spirit.

=== Rejection of Arianism ===
Arianism was unacceptable to Athanasius. However, "Arianism" was always a blanket term of war for him. Arius and his followers had been condemned at the Council of Nicaea and had not since repeated the controversial views condemned by the council. The many "Origenist" opponents of Nicaea were not the theological successors of Arius, but shared with his theology the Origenist tradition of the subordination of the Son and the Holy Spirit to the Father. For Athanasius, however, they were "Arians". For him, distancing himself from Arianism in the Tomus period meant "not separating the Holy Trinity and claiming that one of them is a creature" (Tom 3, 2) - not the Logos, as Arius had taught, not the Holy Spirit, as the Pneumatomachi taught in the second half of the fourth century.

Several other heresies were to be rejected, according to the Tomus: The theological positions of Sabellius, "dynamic" Monarchianism, and Paul of Samosata, "modalistic" Monarchianism, Valentinus and Basilides (both Gnostics), and Manichaeism. These were old heresies which, at the time of the writing of the Tomus (362), were considered largely overcome or seriously heretical. The listing of these "recognized" heresies along with "Arianism" was intended to emphasize their heresy once again; it also probably had the purpose of exonerating Athanasius himself and the Old Nicenes in the West, as well as Markell of Ankyra in particular among the Origenists in the East, from the suspicion of continuing to hold the modalistic Monarchianism of Sabellius. The explicit dissociation from Sabellianism in the Tomus ad Antiochenos was also intended to rid the Nicene Confession of any modalistic "taint".

=== Sufficiency of the Nicene Creed ===
The theological basis for the ecclesial community sought by Athanasius is the creed of the Council of Nicaea. And solely the symbol of the faith of Nicaea, and not any other creed, such as that of Serdica, should be the basis of the ecclesial community: "not to refer to anything other than what was decided in Nicaea" (Tom. 4, 2).

While the church around Paulinus did not have to make any concessions to profess the faith of Nicaea, the church around Meletius found it more difficult to accept this because the Council of Nicaea had endorsed the doctrine of one hypostasis. The Meletians saw this as a condemnation of their three-hypostasis doctrine based on Origen, which had been understood in the same way by the Council of Serdica in 342/343. This council, convened by the emperors Constans and Constantius II in an attempt to bring about unity between East and West, had failed and split into two competing councils that condemned each other.

In the Tomus, Athanasius downplays the importance of the Council of Serdica and in particular the Serdicense, i.e. the confessional formula with which the Western Council had condemned the Eastern doctrine of the three hypostases (Tom 5.1). His report of the council, that some had wanted to adopt a new confession, but the majority had professed the Nicene doctrine, is probably an anachronistic stylization: Athanasius himself first addresses the Council of Nicaea 20–30 years after the Council of Nicaea (325), i.e. after 345/355, as his letter De decretis Nicaenae synodi ("On the Decisions of the Synod of Nicaea") shows, and for the first time formulates a comprehensive claim of the Nicene. Rather, the Serdicense had to be understood as an interpretation of the Nicene. But this was precisely what prevented Meletius and the Origenists of the East from accepting the Nicene Creed. The latter had always identified the Nicene Creed with the harsh anti-Origenist interpretation given to it by the Council of Serdica. However, by downplaying the importance of the Serdicense in the Tomus, Athanasius made it possible for the followers of Meletius and the Eastern theologians to accept the Nicene Creed, which probably first attained the position of exclusive and universally accepted creed in Athanasius' writings in the Tomus.

However, Athanasius' departure from the teachings of the Council of Serdica does not solve the problem. The dispute remains as to whether to speak of the one hypostasis of the Father, Son, and Holy Spirit, as the West did after the Council of Nicea, or of three hypostases, as the East did after Origen.

=== Question of the hypostases ===
In a fictional dialogue in the Tomus, supporters of the three-hypostasis position were asked whether they did not perhaps understand it in an Arian way: "(The hypostases) are a strange and estranged thing, different from one another; or in a tritheistic sense, "as other heretics speak of three powers and three gods" (Tom 5,3). The adherents of the doctrine of the three hypostases rejected this. The reason for speaking of three hypostases was rather the belief "in the Holy Trinity, not only in a Trinity in name but in a Trinity that is and exists" (Tom 5,4). They did not see this as compromising their commitment to the unity of God; on the contrary, the Tomus reports that they subscribed to the Nicene formula that the Son is "of the same nature as the Father" (homousios) (Tom 5:4).

In doing so, they also express the anti-modalist concern that had already guided Origen in his formulation of the "immanent" and gradated Trinity of Father and Son existing in God, both united in unity by the harmony and identity of the will, and of the Holy Spirit, and which was certainly shared by Western Roman theology in the tradition of Tertullian.

''Modalism'' or modalistic Monarchianism, on the other hand, upheld the full deity of the Son and, to preserve monotheism arrived at positions that amounted to an identity of Father and Son since they merely represented different modes of being of the one God depending on the situation, between which there was no real difference.

Conversely, the representatives of the Nicene doctrine of the one hypostasis were asked in a fictitious dialogue whether they did not understand it in the sense of Sabellius, i.e., modalistically. They denied this and affirmed that their doctrine of the one hypostasis was based on the conviction that "the Son is of the same nature as the Father and because of the equality of their natures" (Tom 6:2). The nature of the Son and the Holy Spirit is not alien to that of the Father - the doctrine of the one hypostasis is, therefore, to be understood in an anti-Arian way. The result of these fictitious dialogues, of course, corresponded to Athanasius' intention that each side could accept the doctrine of the other interpreted in this way. The contradictions in the confessional formulas were also explained by differences in the use of language, not as factual differences (cf. Tom 6, 3–4).

=== Human nature of Christ ===
Beyond the Trinitarian theological issues, the Tomus takes up the Christological question of the human nature of Christ in a comparatively short section in a rather simple way. As before, the two unnamed "parties" again have their say, but in this section, their agreement is immediately pointed out, and especially "non-orthodox" theological positions are emphasized. For example, it is emphasized that the relationship between God and man in Jesus Christ must not be presented in the manner of the prophets who received the word of revelation, "but the Word Himself became flesh" (Tom 7:1 about John 1:14). The idea, such as the Miaphysitism of Apollinaris of Laodicea, that Jesus Christ had a soulless human body in which the divine Logos had replaced the human soul, is rejected (Tom 7:2). The unity of human and divine activity in Christ is emphasized.

The brevity and simplicity of this passage may indicate that this Christological question did not have the same significance, at least for Athanasius, as the Trinitarian theological questions dealt with earlier in the Tomus. It is also possible that the Christological section refers to actual or even supposed differences in Antioch between "Eustathians" and "Meletians," with the Meletians perhaps being more ascribed to an Apollinarian Christology, though this is not documented so early, but perhaps also "Arian" or "Homoean".

=== Divinity of the Holy Spirit ===
About the divinity of the Holy Spirit, the Tomus ultimately goes beyond the formulation of the Nicene Creed, albeit only in the form of a negative delimitation: those who believe that the Holy Spirit is created, a creature, and separate from the nature of Christ are also to be condemned. The divinity that applies to the Father and the Son in the Nicene Creed is supplemented by the divine dignity of the Holy Spirit, which is indirectly asserted in this formulation. In the following lines of the Tomus, the Holy Spirit is logically, again negatively defined, counted as part of the Holy Trinity. (Tom 3:1).

The Nicene Creed had at least mentioned the Holy Spirit but without any explanation. It was not until the Niceno-Constantinopolitan Creed that the third, pneumatological article of the creed was to be expanded, granting the Holy Spirit divine dignity with the predicates "Lord" and "Giver of Life," and attributing to Him the same worthiness of worship as the Father and the Son. The Tomus anticipates this pneumatological revaluation.

== Impact and acknowledgment ==
Looking at the history of the impact of the Tomus ad Antiochenos, a distinction must be made between the immediate impact on the Antiochene schism that had prompted the letter and the longer-term theological impact on the doctrine of the Trinity.

=== Failure of the desired church communion ===
The Tomus did not achieve its immediate goal: the Meletian schism continued until the end of the 4th century. This was even though the Tomus had resolved the theological differences of the schism. After the arrival of the Tomus in Antioch, Paulinus testified in an approving text, including his signature, that he accepted the statements made in it, especially the way of speaking of the three hypostases, which he had previously rejected. Meletius also showed that he agreed with the content of the Tomus: when Emperor Julian died in 363 and Jovian succeeded him to the imperial throne, Meletius and the Synod of Antioch of 363 addressed a synodal letter to the new ruler. In it, they declared their loyalty to the Nicene Creed.

The Antiochian schism is said to have persisted primarily because of differences in church policy: Lucifer of Calaris is said to have consecrated Paulinus as bishop before the episcopal commission could begin its mediation. Meletius and his followers must have seen this as a provocation. Moreover, Athanasius immediately recognized his old Nicene companion Paulinus as bishop and wanted to see the united Antiochian community under his leadership, not that of Meletius. However, Paulinus sent two deacons from Antioch to Alexandria for the synod. At least we have the signatures of the deacons Maximus and Calhemerus, who, together with the bishops of the "episcopal commission," sign the Tomus in an appendix and are explicitly mentioned as Paulinus' deacons and emissaries. The deacons could only have been sent to Alexandria by Paulinus when he was already a bishop, so the reason for the persistence of the schism in Antioch was probably not a premature consecration of Paulinus as bishop by Lucifer of Calaris, which, despite later information from church historians, probably did not take place at all.

=== Paving the way for the Cappadocian doctrine of the Trinity ===
Even if the immediate concern of an ecclesial community in Antioch failed, the "liquefaction of entrenched argumentative strategies ... released considerable theological creativity in the long run. By legitimizing the use of one hypostasis as well as three, and by eliminating the identification of ousia and hypostasis, the Tomus paved the way for a linguistic regulation that established Ousia as a term expressing the unity of God, while hypostasis could be used to express the Trinity of Father, Son, and Holy Spirit.

The trinitarian theological disputes before the Synod of Alexandria were the expression of a dilemma. The dilemma consisted in preserving (against the charge of tritheism) the unity of God, while at the same time (against Arianism, among others) upholding the divinity of the Son and (against the Pneumatomachi) that of the Holy Spirit, but also (against Sabellianism) emphasizing the truly existing, not merely nominal, Trinity of Father, Son, and Holy Spirit. As Tom 5:3-6:4 shows, Athanasius and the Synod of Alexandria were concerned precisely with resolving this dilemma by making room for the concern for the unity of God as well as that of the Trinity.

It was Basil of Caesarea who finally resolved the Trinitarian theological dilemma by speaking of one ousia and three hypostases. Together with the other two great Cappadocians - his brother Gregory of Nyssa and their mutual friend Gregory of Nazianzus -, he was able to help this solution to break through and, with the support of the Eastern Roman Emperor Theodosius I, to become universally valid and to reunite the Church of the Roman Empire based on the Nicene Creed, as Athanasius had probably hoped.

=== Nicaenum in variants ===
Athanasius and the Synod of Alexandria had realized that there could be not one, but several theological doctrines and Trinitarian language options based on the Nicene Creed. They thus differed from earlier interpretations of the Nicene Creed, especially that of the Council of Serdica. However, the Tomus Creed also distinguished itself from theological positions that were considered heretical, especially "Arianism" and Sabellianism.

== Tradition and edition ==
=== Manuscript tradition ===
The works of Athanasius have not yet appeared in a complete textual critique so Athanasius's research can only make preliminary statements about the manuscript tradition, dependencies, and lines of tradition of the manuscripts. However, the work of Hans-Georg Opitz, who in the 1930s not only published a critical edition of some of Athanasius' works, but also studied the transmission history of Athanasius' writings in detail, is still important. Since 2006, a critical edition of the Greek text of the Tomus ad Antiochenos has been available with an introduction that reflects the current state of research.

=== Textual traditions and manuscripts with collections of the work of Athanasius ===
The works of Athanasius have come down to us in four textual traditions or collections, which the editors of the critical Edition have designated by the letters a, b, x, and y. The Tomus is the only work of Athanasius that is included in three of these textual traditions, the a, b, and y traditions; it is not included in the x collection.

While there are only minor differences between the a and b versions, these two differ greatly from the y version. The former ends with the final greeting in ch. 9:3, while the latter also contains appendices in which various authors express their agreement with the Tomus. According to current research, the shorter version of the a- and b-versions is considered to be the original, while the additions in the y-version are secondary additions that already reflect the post-synodal history.

In some of the manuscripts in which the works of Athanasius are preserved, several of these collections have been compiled. However, double transmission of the same work in a manuscript was avoided, so that the Tomus ad Antiochenos is included only once in each manuscript, even if the manuscript contains several of the old collections that contained the Tomus ad Antiochenos.

The most important manuscripts that transmit the Tomus ad Antiochenos are the following:

- For the y-tradition: the codices B (Basel University Library, Ms. A III 4), K (Athos, Hiera Mone Batopediou, Ms. 5/6), O (Real Biblioteca, San Lorenzo de El Escorial, Ms. gr. X II 11 [371]), P (Biblioteca Palatina, Parma Ms. Pal. 10), S (Bibliothèque nationale de France, Paris, Coislin. 45 (133)).
- For the a-tradition: Codex R (Bibliothèque nationale de France, Paris, Ms. gr. 474).
- For the b-tradition: Codex Z (Biblioteca Apostolica Vaticana, Vat. gr. 1431) and the Syriac translation Σ (British Library, London, Or. 8606).

=== Secondary tradition ===
Two excerpts from the Tomus ad Antiochenos can be found in the Florilegium Edessenum, which contains some special readings but is otherwise dependent on the Vatican Codex Z mentioned above. Innocent of Maronea, Severus of Antioch, Timotheus Aelurus, and the Armenian Seal of Faith all contain an excerpt from Tom 7, 2–3.

Paulinus' declaration of consent to the Tomus (Tom 11,2) was originally an independent text, which only became part of the y-tradition of the Tomus in a later collection. Paulinus' assent is otherwise preserved in isolation in the Panarion of Epiphanius of Salamis, a work refuting eighty heretical doctrinal systems. The context suggests that Epiphanius did not have this statement as part of the Tomus ad Antiochenos, but as a separate document, so his version should be considered an independent textual witness.

=== Text editions ===
The first printed edition (editio princeps) of the works of Athanasius, and thus also of the Tomus ad Antiochenos, was the Editio Commeliniana, published in Heidelberg in 1601. This edition was also used by the Maurists Jacques Lopin and Bernard de Montfaucon for their three-volume edition of Athanasius' works, published in Paris in 1698, which - with the exception of individual works that have since appeared in critical editions, including the Tomus ad Antiochenos - is still considered the standard. The edition in the Patrologia graeca by Jacques Paul Migne (PG 26.796-809) is a reprint of the Maurin edition.

In the 1930s, Hans-Georg Opitz worked on the second and third volumes of the critical edition of the writings of Athanasius on behalf of the Church Fathers Commission of the Prussian Academy of Sciences. Due to his untimely death in 1941, Opitz was unable to complete the edition, and he was only able to edit the Tomus ad Antiochenos before it went to printing. His basic editorial decision not to attempt the closest possible approximation to the original text of Athanasius, but rather to give priority to the version of the text that is central to the history of its impact, is criticized from today's editorial and text-critical perspective.

Even after the Second World War, no progress was made on the edition of Volume II. Walther Eltester and later Wilhelm Schneemelcher worked on it, the latter handing over all his preliminary work to Hanns Christof Brennecke in 1998. As part of a working group at the University of Erlangen and on behalf of the Berlin-Brandenburg Academy of Sciences and Humanities, Brennecke was able to complete the edition of Volume II in 2006.

=== Translations ===
An ancient translation into Syriac has been preserved in a single manuscript (see above). It was published and translated into English by Robert W. Thomson in 1967. This translation is considered an independent textual witness in terms of textual criticism. Ancient translations into Latin are documented in secondary sources. The first printed Latin edition of the Tomus ad Antiochenos was published by Hieronymus Froben in Basel in 1556.

The following translations are available in modern languages: A German translation appeared in the 39-volume collection Sämtliche Werke der Kirchenväter aus dem Urtext in das Teutsche übersetzt (SWKV, Kempten 1831–1853), volume 16, 1836, pp. 313–325. An English translation was made by W. Bright, Later Treatises of St. Athanasius, Oxford 1881 (volume 46 of the series Library of the Fathers of the Holy Catholic Church). In the series A Select Library of the Nicene and Post-Nicene Fathers (reprint Grand Rapids 1980–1991) an English translation was published by H. Ellershaw (vol. 4, pp. 483–486).

A new German translation was published in 2014 as part of the Athanasius works by the Arbeitsstelle Athanasius Werke at the University of Erlangen-Nürnberg. Ignacio Ortiz de Urbina and Changseon Yeum also offer a German translation of the Tomus ad Antiochenos as part of the secondary literature on church history.

== Bibliography ==
=== Text editions ===
- Athanasius: Werke. Vol. 2: Die Apologien. Ed. v. Hans-Georg Opitz (†), vol. 8, edited by Hanns Christof Brennecke/Uta Heil/Annette von Stockhausen, de Gruyter, Berlin 2006, ISBN 978-3-11-017856-2, p. 340–351 (Critical edition)
- Greek online text of the Athanasius works Erlangen office
- Hanns Christof Brennecke, Annette von Stockhausen, Christian Müller, Uta Heil, Angelika Wintjes (Ed.): Athanasius Werke. Dritter Band, erster Teil. Dokumente zur Geschichte des arianischen Streites. 4. Lieferung: Bis zur Synode von Alexandrien 362. Walter de Gruyter, Berlin/Boston 2014, p. 592-603. Greek text of the 2006 critical edition and German translation.
- Robert W. Thomson: Athanasiana syriaca. Part II. Edition. Scriptores syri (Tomus 118). Corpus Scriptorum Christianorum Orientalium, Louvain 1967 (Edition of the Syriac translation)
- Robert W. Thomson: Athanasiana syriaca. Part II. Translation. Scriptores syri (Tomus 119). Corpus Scriptorum Christianorum Orientalium, Louvain 1967 (English translation of the Syriac translation)

=== Secondary bibliography ===
- Changseon Yeum: Die Synode von Alexandrien (362). Die dogmengeschichtliche und kirchenpolitische Bedeutung für die Kirche im 4. Jahrhundert. LIT, Münster 2005, ISBN 3-8258-8460-0. (The only monograph on the subject to date; cf. also the review by Peter Gemeinhardt in the Journal of Church History 117 (2006), p. 97f.)
- Peter Gemeinhardt: Der Tomus ad Antiochenos (362) und die Vielfalt orthodoxer Theologien im 4. Jahrhundert. In: Journal of Church History. Vol. 117, 2006, p. 169-196.
- Martin Tetz: Über nikäische Orthodoxie. Der sog. Tomus ad Antiochenos des Athanasios von Alexandrien. In: Journal for New Testament Studies and the Ancient Church. Vol. 66, 1975, p. 194–222. Republished in: Athanasiana. Zu Leben und Lehre des Athanasius, edited by Wilhelm Geerlings and Dietmar Wywra, supplementary booklet to the Journal for New Testament Studies and the Ancient Church 78, Berlin 1995, 107–134. (An important, often cited essay in the history of research)
- Annette von Stockhausen: Praefatio. In: Hanns Christof Brennecke et al. (ed.): Athanasius Werke. Zweiter Band: Die „Apologien“. 8. Lieferung. Walter de Gruyter, Berlin 2006, ISBN 978-3-11-017856-2, pp. xi-cxxv. (Introduction to the critical edition)
