= William Perault =

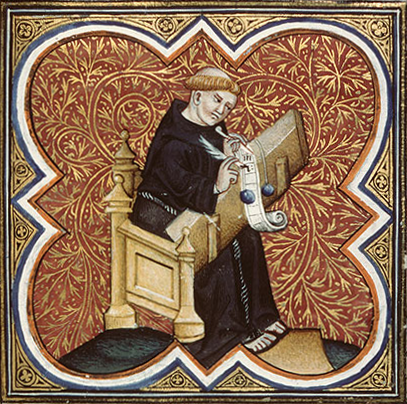
William Perault writing De Eruditione Principum from a late medieval manuscript

William Perault (c. 1190 – 1271), also spelled Perauld; Latinized Peraldus or Peraltus, was a Dominican writer and preacher.

== Life ==
He was born at Peyraud, France. He studied at the Sorbonne University of Paris, and there, being drawn to the religious life by the preaching perhaps of Jordan of Saxony, he was received into the Dominican Order.

It is thought that Perault was somewhat advanced in years when he embraced the religious state, although the precise date of his entrance into it is also unknown. He entered the order at Paris, but was destined, according to a custom then existing, for the convent at Lyons. At Lyons, where he passed his life, at once contemplative and active, he rendered service to the Church by the brilliancy of his writings and preaching and by the charm and splendour of his virtues.

His part in ecclesiastical affairs was for a time also very important. For fully ten years he performed all the episcopal functions of the Church of Lyons, having been chosen for this work during the vacancy of the see by Philip I, Count of Savoy who, although not in Holy orders, bore the title of Archbishop of Lyon from 1245 to 1267. Because of Perault's long labours in ministering to the needs of the diocese, he himself came to be known as the Bishop or Archbishop of Lyon. This error was further emphasized by the title of bishop which a later hand added to many of his writings. Authors such as Gerson, Noël Alexandre, Jacques Échard, and Hurter say that William Perault was never Archbishop of Lyons, as the Gallia christiana asserts, Louis Ellies du Pin is not justified in saying that he was never more than a religious of the Order of Preachers (cf. Antoine Touron, Hist. des hommes illust., 1, l.2, 184).

He died at Lyons.

== Writings ==
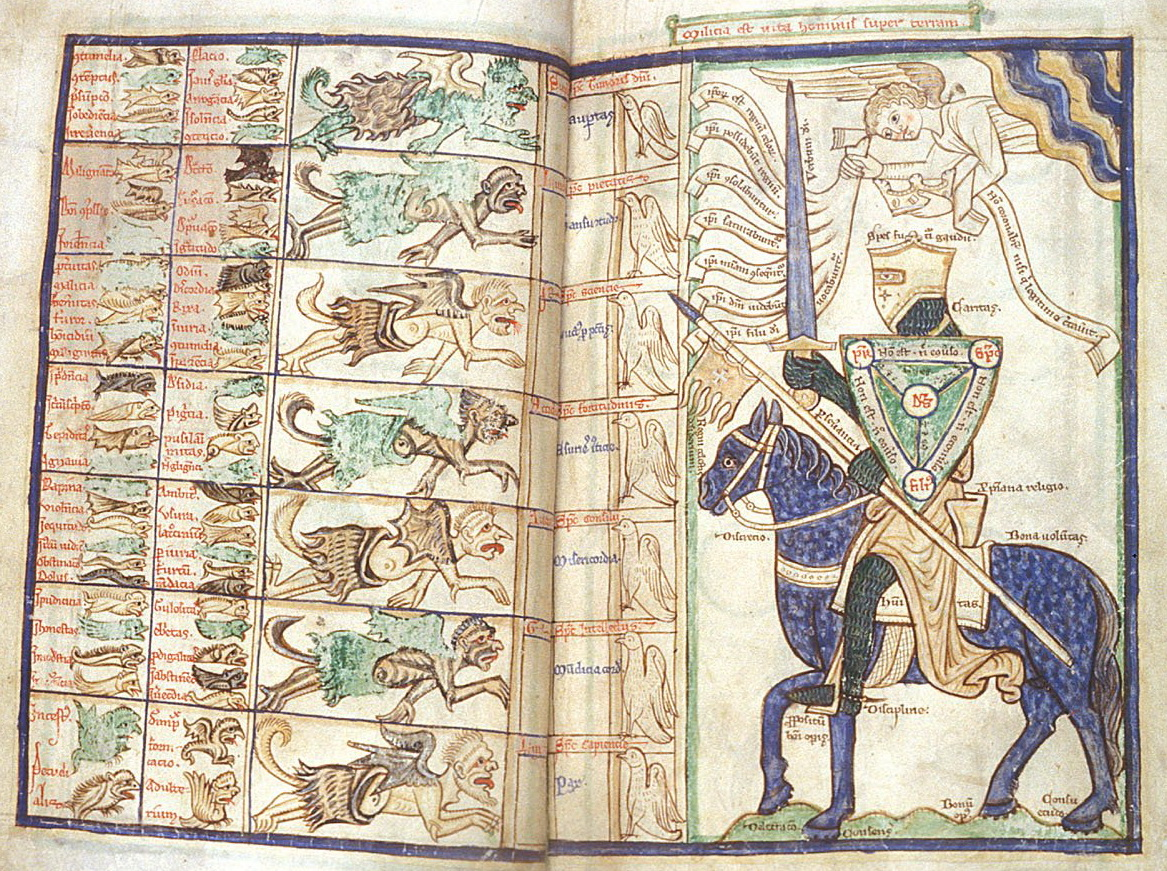
Elaborate illustration to a 13th-century manuscript of his Summa de virtutibus et vitiis or Summa vitiorum, showing a symbolic knight protected by the Shield of the Trinity preparing to do battle with the Seven Deadly Sins.

His works include:

- Summa de virtutibus et vitiis (Cologne, 1497, 1618, 1629; Venice, 1492, 1497; Rome, 1557; Lyons, 1668)
- Sermones de tempore et de sanctis, which appeared under the name of William III of Paris (Paris, 1494; Cologne, 1629)
- De eruditione seu de institutione religiosorum (Paris, 1512; Louvain, 1575; Lyons, 1585)
- De regimine principum, which, as in the Roman edition of 1570, was attributed to Thomas Aquinas and of which, in fact, Aquinas wrote a part: Speculum religiosorum seu institutionum vitae spiritualis, which appeared under the name of Humbert de Romans, Master-General of the Order of Preachers.
