= Auxentius of Milan =

Theologian and bishop of Milan, Italy (c. 355–374)

Auxentius
- Arian Bishop of Milan
- Church: Eastern Orthodox Church
- Appointed: 355 AD
- Term ended: 374 AD
- Predecessor: Dionysius
- Successor: Ambrose

Personal details
- Born: c. 4th century AD Silistra, Moesia, Roman Empire
- Died: c. 374 AD Milan, Roman Italy, Roman Empire

Auxentius of Milan or of Cappadocia (fl. 343 – 374) was an Arian theologian and bishop of Milan. Because of his Arian faith, Auxentius is considered by the Catholic Church to have been an intruder, and he is not included in Catholic lists of the bishops of Milan, such as the one engraved in the Cathedral of Milan.

Auxentius came to be regarded as the chief opponent of the Nicene Creed in the West. His theological doctrines were attacked by Hilary of Poitiers, whose Liber contra Auxentium remains the principal source of information about him.

== Life ==
Auxentius was a native of Cappadocia and was ordained a priest in 343 by Gregory of Cappadocia, the Arian bishop of Alexandria. According to his opponent Athanasius of Alexandria, Auxentius was "even ignorant of the Latin language, and unskilful in everything except impiety".

The period in which Auxentius lived was marked by the conflict between the Arians and the supporters of the faith defined at the Council of Nicaea. In 355, the Roman emperor Constantius II convened a synod in Milan, where Dionysius, bishop of Milan, along with Eusebius of Vercelli and Lucifer of Cagliari, opposed the emperor's Arian leanings. This resulted in the exile of all three. Shortly thereafter, the Arian bishops, with the emperor's support, appointed Auxentius as bishop of Milan.

In 359, Auxentius played a notable role at the Council of Rimini, which endorsed the Semi-Arian doctrines articulated at the Second Council of Sirmium in 351. After Constantius's death, the pagan emperor Julian (died 363) left Auxentius undisturbed in his diocese.

Under the subsequent Christian emperors Jovian and Valentinian I, supporters of the Nicaean faith made multiple attempts to depose Auxentius. In 364, Auxentius was publicly accused during a disputation with Hilary of Poitiers held in Milan by order of Emperor Valentinian I. His submission was only apparent, however, and he remained influential enough to compel Hilary's departure from Milan. Eusebius of Vercelli and Athanasius of Alexandria also failed to secure Auxentius's deposition.

In 372, Pope Damasus I convened a synod that explicitly condemned Auxentius as a heretic. Nevertheless, Auxentius remained in Milan until his death in 374, despite the efforts of the Nicaean priest Philastrius (later bishop of Brescia) to support the Christian population. Auxentius was succeeded by the Nicaean Ambrose.
