= Gratus of Aosta =

Italian bishop and saint

Saint Gratus
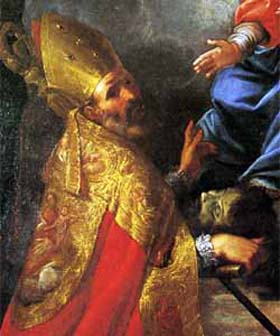
- Saint Gratus, with the head of Saint John the Baptist
- Died: c. AD 470
- Venerated in: Roman Catholic Church; Eastern Orthodox Church
- Major shrine: Aosta
- Feast: September 7
- Attributes: episcopal garb; head of John the Baptist; bunch of grapes; bishop with lightning flashing near him
- Patronage: Aosta; vineyards; invoked against fear of insects; against dangerous animals, against fire, against hail, against lightning, against rain, against storms

Gratus of Aosta (Italian: San Grato di Aosta, French: Saint Grat d'Aoste) (d. September 7, c. AD 470) was a bishop of Aosta and is the city's patron saint.

== Life ==
It is thought that both Gratus and Eustasius were of Greek origin and that they received their education and ecclesiastical formation from the type of monastic foundation in Italy established by Eusebius of Vercelli, which was modeled on that of the Eastern cenobites. He is known to have signed the acts of the synod of Milan in AD 451 as a priest. Gratus represented the bishop of Aosta, Eustasius, at this council, signing the letter that the assembly sent to Pope Leo I the Great in order to affirm its condemnation of the heresy of Eutyches.

Gratus became bishop of Aosta sometime after 451, and presided over the translation of various relics in the city around 470, including those of Innocent, one of the martyrs of the Theban Legion. The bishops of Agaunum and Sion were present at this translation.

The year of his death is not known, but the day is: his tomb in the parochial church of Saint-Christophe bears an inscription that reads Hic requiescit in pace S. M. GRATUS EPS D P SUB D. VII ID. SEPTEMB. His relics are preserved in the Collegiate church of Saint Ursus in Aosta.

== Veneration ==
His feast day is September 7. The diffusion of Gratus' cult occurred in the twelfth and thirteenth centuries, when his relics were translated from the church of St. Laurence (in Aosta) to the Collegiate church of Saint Ursus. Some of his relics lie there still, in a gold and silver reliquary.

One March 27 of an uncertain year, a liturgical feast was introduced in the diocese of Aosta that honored the translation of Gratus' relics. An ancient ritual of pagan origin consisted of a blessing of the earth, the water, and the candles, coinciding with the coming of spring. During the Middle Ages, Gratus was invoked against a series of natural disasters: floods caused by the melting of the winter snows; drought; hailstones; fire; grasshoppers and moles that devastated the fields. As a thaumaturgus, he was invoked against witches and devils. In 1450, he was invoked against a plague of insects in the Tarentaise region of France. Gratus is particularly invoked for the protection of crops.

== Background ==
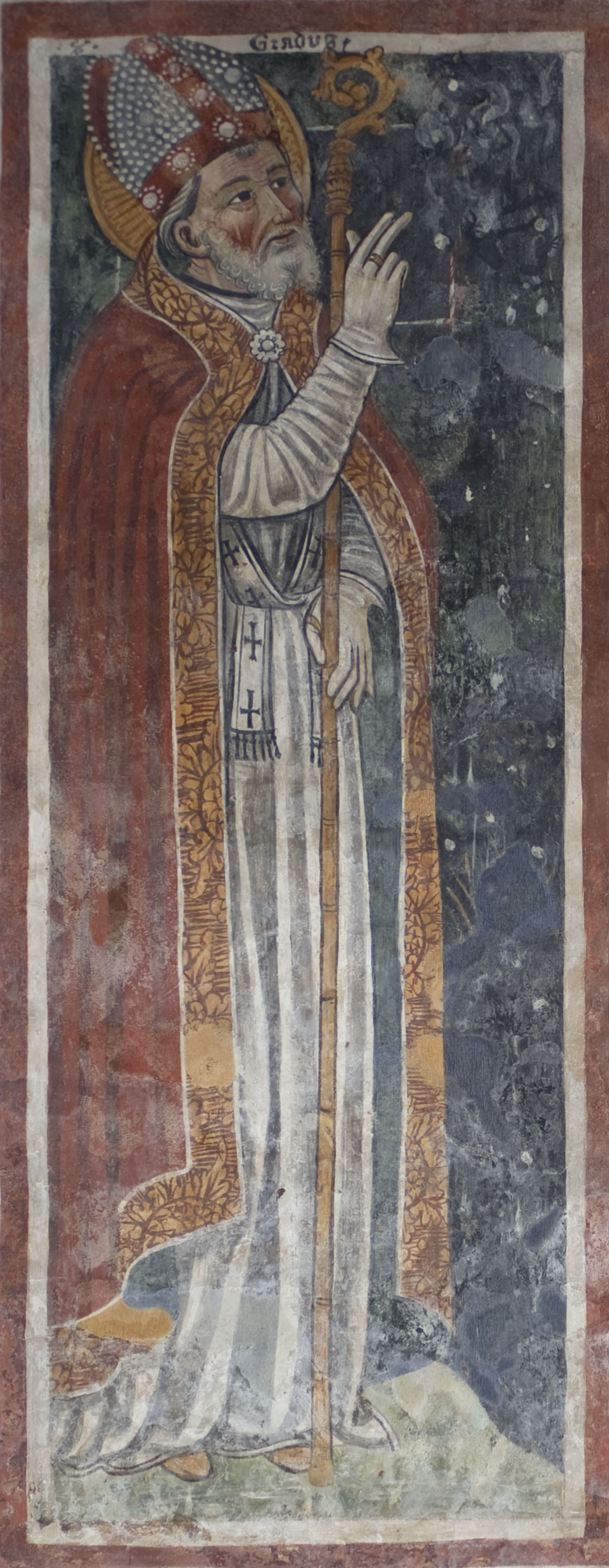
Fresco at Oratorio di Santa Maria, Garbagna Nov. (Italy), late 15th century

In 1285, the Magna Legenda Sancti Grati, a fictitious and anachronistic account of his life, was composed by Jacques de Cours, canon of Aosta Cathedral, to celebrate the translation of the saint's relics.

In this account, Gratus was said to have been born into a noble Spartan family. He studied at Athens and became a monk. In order to escape the persecutions in the East, he fled to Rome, where he was well received and was sent as an emissary to the court of Charlemagne.

A vision experienced at the Pantheon sent him to Aosta. He converted many pagans there and Charlemagne aided him in his mission. By divine command, he was then sent to the Holy Land to find the head of John the Baptist. For this reason, Gratus is sometimes depicted with John the Baptist's head in iconography. He was accompanied by Jucundus of Aosta (Italian: Giocondo or French: Joconde). Gratus found the relic concealed in the palace of Herod. Smuggling it out of Jerusalem, Gratus returned to Rome, where churchbells played of their own accord in celebration. Gratus presented John's head to the Pope; in doing so, the jawbone remained in Gratus' hand. This was interpreted as a sign, and the Pope allowed him to carry that precious relic back to Aosta. Gratus continued to govern the diocese, while periodically withdrawing to a hermitage with Jucundus.

This story was contested as early as the sixteenth century. Caesar Baronius, who drafted a new edition to the Roman Martyrology (1586), doubted the veracity of the tale. In the twentieth century, the historian Aimé Pierre Frutaz demonstrated that the Magna Legenda Sancti Grati was an invented tale. However, the tale had spurred the diffusion of Gratus' cult into Piedmont, Lombardy, Switzerland and Savoy, and provided the basis for the saint's attributes.

== Sources ==
- Béthaz, Pierre Joseph (1884). Vie de saint Grat évêque et patron du diocèse d'Aoste Aoste: Édouard Duc. (in French)
- Frutaz, Amato Pietro (1966). Le fonti per la storia della Valle d'Aosta. Thesaurus Ecclesiarum Italiae I, 1. (in Italian). Roma: Ed. di Storia e Letteratura. pp. 289–290. GGKEY:G2G579NHXT9.
- Savio, Fedele (1898). Gli antichi vescovi d'Italia dalle origini al 1300 descritti per regioni: Il Piemonte (in Italian). Torino: Fratelli Bocca. pp. 72–76.
- Stilting, Johannes (1750). Acta Sanctorum Septembris (in Latin). Vol. Tomus III. Antwerp: Bernardus Albertus vander Plassche. pp. 72–78.
