= Festal Index =

The Festal Index (or Chronicon Athanasianum) is an anonymous annotated index to a lost collection of the festal letters of Athanasius of Alexandria (died 373). Today, it is valued by scholars for its information on the chronology of Athanasius' career and the administration of Roman Egypt. The traditional numbering of the festal letters from I to XLV is based on the Index.

== History ==
The Festal Index was originally written in Greek, probably around 400 in Alexandria. It is known today only from a Syriac translation that does not correspond perfectly with the Syriac letter collection to which it is attached. The letter collection that the anonymous indexer had before him lacked the letters Athanasius wrote while in exile. This particular collection is lost. The Greek Index became attached to a different collection probably within a century of its composition. This new collection of Index and letters was translated into Syriac in the 6th or 7th century. The Syriac version is seemingly a very literal translation.

A single manuscript copy exists, British Library Add MS 14569, dated to the 8th or 10th century. An incomplete Syriac text was published by William Cureton in 1848 and a complete text with English translation by Henry Burgess in 1854. A Latin translation based on Cureton's text was published in 1857 as part of the Patrologia Graeca. A new critical edition by A. Martin and M. Albert appeared in 1985. It is the basis for the 2022 English translation of David Brakke and David Gwynn and the 2003 Italian translation by Alberto Camplani.

== Contents ==
The Index gives the date of Easter as celebrated in Alexandria under two calendars: the Egyptian calendar (which began on 1 Thoth, i.e., 29 August), dating years by the Era of the Martyrs (which began in AD 284), and the Julian calendar (which began on 1 January), using consular dating for years. Certain errors of dating events by year can be attributed to this dual system, but day and month dates are accurate. The day of the lunar month is also given for Easter. The epact and the day of the week for 28 Phamenoth (24 March) are also given. Besides the consuls, the prefect of Egypt is named.

The Index consists of a short introduction and 45 entries for the years 329–373 bracketed by a colophon and explicit. One of the main purposes of the Index is to explain why no festal letter was sent in certain years. The Index also explains Athanasius' efforts to bring the Alexandrian Easter dating into line with Roman dating as agreed upon at the Council of Serdica in 343. Numerous events from Athanasius' life are dated and described, always from a pro-Athanasian point of view. The contents of the festal letters are not described, save Letter 39 on the biblical canon, which already stood apart from the rest for its importance. The entry for 364 reads as follows:

In the following [year], the Sunday of the Passover was the ninth of Pharmouthi [4 April], the first before the Nones of April, the sixteenth of the moon, epact three, the fourth of the gods, the seventh indiction, during the consulship of Jovian Augustus and of Beronianus [364], when the governor was Hierius of Damascus, the prefect, after whom was Maximus of Raphia, after whom was Flavianus the Illyrian.

During this [year] the pope entered the city of Alexandria and the church on the twenty-fifth of Mecheir [19 February], but he sent the festal letter from Antioch, as customary, to all the bishops in the entire province.

The entry for 365 mentions the that year's earthquake and tsunami and no festal letter.

== Bibliography ==
- Burgess, Henry, ed. (1854). The Festal Epistles of S. Athanasius, Bishop of Alexandria. John Henry Parker.
- Brakke, David; Gwynn, David M., eds. (2022). The Festal Letters of Athanasius of Alexandria, with the Festal Index and the Historia Acephala. Liverpool University Press.
- Camplani, Alberto, ed. (2003). Atanasio di Alessandria: Lettere festali; Anonimo: Indice delle Lettere festali. Paoline.
- Casiday, A. M. (2004). "Review of Camplani 2003". Journal of Early Christian Studies. 12 (3): 366–367.
- Robertson, Archibald, ed. (1892). Select Writings and Letters of Athanasius, Bishop of Alexandria (PDF). Nicene and Post-Nicene Fathers, 2nd ser., vol. 4. The Christian Literature Company.
