= Dionysius (bishop of Milan) =

Archbishop of Milan (4th c.)

- Archbishop of Milan
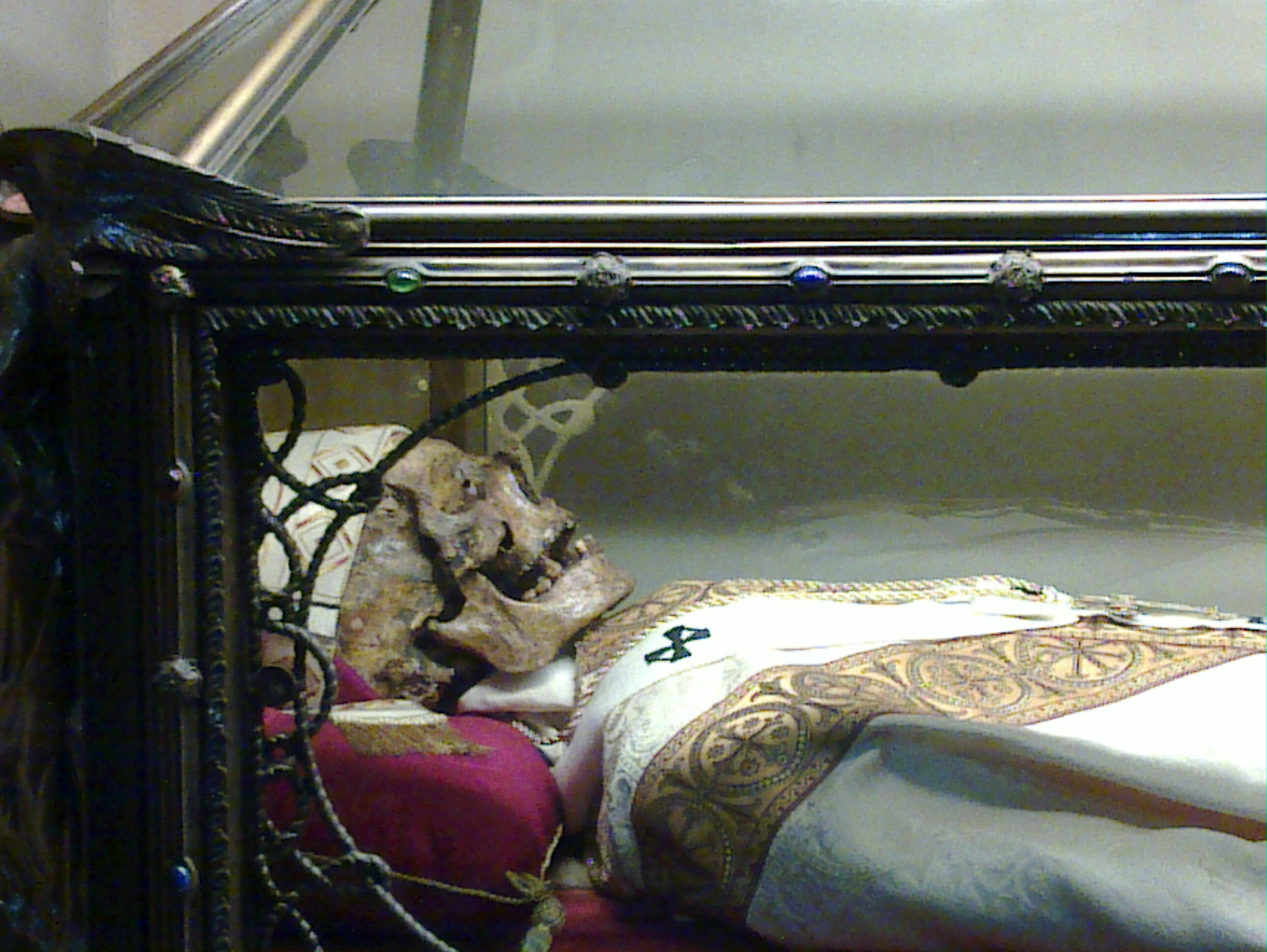
- Relic of Saint Dionysius, Cathedral of Milan
- Church: Catholic Church
- Appointed: 349 AD
- Term ended: 355 AD
- Predecessor: Eustorgius I
- Successor: Auxentius

Personal details
- Born: Milan, Italy, Roman Empire
- Died: c. 360 AD Cappadocia, Roman Empire

Sainthood
- Feast day: 25 May
- Venerated in: Catholic Church; Eastern Orthodox

Dionysius (Italian: Dionigi, died c. 360 AD) was bishop of Milan from 349 to 355. He is honoured as a Saint in the Catholic and Eastern Orthodox churches and his feast day is 25 May.

== Life ==
Almost nothing is known about the life of Dionysius before his election as bishop of Milan, which took place in 349. Dionysius was probably of Greek origin. He was a friend of the Roman Emperor Constantius II before being elected bishop of Milan.

The historical period in which Dionysius lived was marked by clashes between Arians and the supporters of the faith of the Council of Nicaea. Even Emperor Constantius II favored Semi-Arian doctrines. In 355 Pope Liberius requested the Emperor to convene a Synod in Milan, which was held in the newly erected Basilica Nova (or Basilica Maior or St. Tecla). The council however did not accomplish the hopes of the Pope due to the overwhelming number of Arian bishops present and the enforced absence of the champion of the Nicaean faith, Eusebius of Vercelli. Initially Dionysius seemed ready to follow the Arians in condemning the Nicaean Athanasius of Alexandria, who was accused not of heresy but of lese-majesty against the Emperor. With the arrival of Eusebius the situation changed. Eusebius requested an immediate subscription of the Nicaean faith by the bishops. Eusebius, the Papal legate Lucifer of Cagliari and Dionysius signed, but the Arian bishop Valens of Mursia violently shredded the act of faith.

Constantius, unaccustomed to independence on the part of the bishops, moved the synod to his palace, and grievously maltreated Eusebius, Lucifer and Dionysius, which were all three exiled (also Pope Liberius was shortly later exiled). Dionysius was exiled in Caesarea of Cappadocia and was substituted as bishop of Milan by the Arian Auxentius appointed by the Emperor.

Dionysius died in exile between 360 and 362. A late tradition, historically unfounded, associates Dionysius with the Mariani, a Milanese family.

== Veneration ==
Dionysius' feast is celebrated on 25 May. According to a late tradition, probably not historical, Ambrose sent in 375 or 376 a delegation to recover the corpse of Dionysius and to translate it to Milan. Even if it is historically difficult to determine when exactly the relics of Dionysius were translated to Milan, a primary source states that the relics were already in Milan in 744. A shrine dedicated to Dionysius was erected in Milan near Porta Venezia but it was destroyed in 1549, rebuild nearby and definitely knocked down in 1783 to leave space for the new gardens. The corpse of Dionysius was translated in the Cathedral of Milan in 1532.

Nowadays three parishes in Lombardia are entitled to Saint Dionysius: San Dionigi in Pratocentenaro in Milano, San Dionigi in Premana and San Dionigi in Carcano of Albavilla.
