= On the Incarnation =

Work by Athanasius of Alexandria

On the Incarnation is a theological work by Athanasius of Alexandria.

It is an apologetic treatise, also known as On the Incarnation of the Word, which defends the incarnation of Christ against the ideas of 4th century non-Christians. The scope is to explain the reason for incarnation.

The book was popularized by editions published with an introduction written by C. S. Lewis. Lewis' introduction was also published as an essay On the Reading of Old Books. In it, he describes On the Incarnation as a masterpiece which is easy to read.

== Contents ==
- 1. Creation and the Fall.
- 2. The Divine Dilemma and its Solution in the Incarnation.
- 3. The Divine Dilemma and its Solution in the Incarnation - Continued.
- 4. The Death of Christ.
- 5. The Resurrection.
- 6. Refutation of the Jews.
- 7. Refutation of the Gentiles.
- 8. Refutation of the Gentiles - Continued
- 9. Conclusion.

== Transmission ==
There are two families of manuscripts based on whether they contain the long or short recensions. The short recension is generally agreed to be a revision of the long recension to emphasise Christ as Logos rather than as man. Such changes were possibly made by elder Athanasius or his followers after his death; they have alternatively been attributed to Apollinarians, who sought during the fifth century to appeal to Athanasius' authority in disputes over Christological doctrine.

The editio princeps of the long rescension was printed in 1601 at Heidelberg. The best long recension manuscript is the Codex Seguerianus, which dates to the twelfth century and is named for Pierre Séguier. It is located today in the Bibliothèque nationale de France as part of the Fonds Coislin. There are fifteen major long recension manuscripts, ranging in age from the 10th century through to the 16th century, with the best being the Seguerianus and two manuscripts both currently at the Biblioteca Laurentiana in Florence dating to the 10th and 12th centuries AD.

There are four major short recension manuscripts. The short recension was discovered in 1925 within a manuscript at the Vatican Library which was written during the 6th century in the Syriac language. The other three manuscripts, in order of age, are located at the Greek National Library in Athens, the Docheiariou at Mt Athos, and the Biblioteca Ambrosiana in Milan.

Testimonia are also given in Theodoret.

The first major critical edition by the Benedictine monk Bernard de Montfaucon was published in 1698 based on the Seguerianus. Athansius' work was first translated into English in 1880, following the Benedictine edition. The series Oxford Early Christian Texts published in 1971 an edition with translation edited by Robert W. Thomson, the first critical edition of both long and short recensions with the companion work Contra Gentes.

== Bibliography ==
- Athanasius (1901). Robertson, Archibald (ed.). St. Athanasius On The incarnation: the Greek text (Third ed.). London: D. Nutt.
  - Robertson, Archibald. "Prefaces". In Athanasius (1901), pp. vii–xiii.
- Frend, W H C (1972). Scottish Journal of Theology. 25 (3): 375–377. doi:10.1017/S0036930600028489. ISSN 1475-3065.
- Hardy, Edward Rochie (1954). Christology of the later fathers. Philadelphia, PA: Westminster Press.
- Louth, A (1972). "Review of "Athanasius: Contra Gentes and De Incarnatione"". Journal of Theological Studies. 23 (1): 239–241. ISSN 0022-5185. JSTOR 23960058.
- Thomson, Robert W (1971). Athanasius: Contra Gentes and De Incarnatione. Oxford: Clarendon Press.
