= Pancratius =

Pancratius may refer to:

- Saint Pancras of Rome
- Pancratius, a priest who attended the 355 Council of Milan
