= Arabic Homily of Pseudo-Theophilus of Alexandria =

Alexandria Arabic

The Arabic Homily of Pseudo-Theophilus of Alexandria is a pseudonymous prophetic sermon pertaining to eulogies and stories of miracles in Rome about the Apostles Paul and Peter, including their corpses. A dialogue between Peter and Athanasius of Alexandria during Athanasius's exile in Rome is considered one of the most important stories in the text. It pertains to the future of the inhabitants of Egypt as well as Egypt itself and presents passages about Arab dominance and Islam.

== Dialogue between Peter and Athanasius ==
The dialogue begins with a prophecy by Peter outlining how the episcopal see of Athanasius will be the only one loyal to the true faith, and God removing the Byzantines from Egypt and establishing a nation that will care for the Churches and not commit any sin. The nation, which is identified as the Arabs, will chastise the people of Egypt on account of their sins as the Arabs were chosen to be God's instrument. The chastisement is short, and those who endure it receive salvation.

A series of questions and answers are then commenced between Peter and Athanasius about those who will be excluded from the Kingdom of Heaven. Concerning "the nation" (Muslims), despite their constant fasting, praying, and servitude to God, they will not receive the Kingdom of Heaven because they do not believe in Jesus and the Holy Spirit, have not been baptized, and do not receive the Eucharist. Christians who renounce Jesus and intergrade with the Muslims despite their faith in God or keep their faith in Christ but in thought only because they fear the people are dismissed by Peter from entering Heaven when Athanasius queries concerning them and their place in Heaven despite their attempts to keep a religious connection with their former faith.

== Date ==
Though the text attributes its authorship to Theophilus I of Alexandria, the unknown author was from the Islamic period as passages frequently reference Arab rule and Islam. The date for the composition varies between the seventh century to the ninth century, but the text provides little historical reference to estimate the date. There's a possibility of the text dating from the seventh or eighth centuries as the text states that the Arab rule was both respectful towards the Christians and oppressive, matches the period when Egyptian Copts felt at ease from the previous fifty years but also the first to experience the changing attitude of Muslim rulers towards their Christian subjects such as fierce tax implications and religious assertiveness documented for the period. A somewhat nationalistic tone of a glorified Egypt, the anti-Chalcedonian orthodox inhabitants, and the Apostle Peter's praise of Athanasius and his see would place the date of composition in the middle of the first century of Islamic rule over Egypt, a time of fierce political change, when the Coptic Church of Alexandria was concerned for its anti-Chalcedonian identity.

== Authorship ==
The author is unknown, and the original language of the text was either Coptic or Greek. The composition is estimated to be from the late seventh century or early eighth century. which is nearly contemporary to the composition of the Life of Theodota. The sermon is one of the oldest writings from the Coptic Orthodox community containing descriptions and responses to religious challenges of Islam and pertains info on the Islamic doctrine and is an important account of early Coptic tradition of the positive attitude towards the initial period of Islamic rule.

== Bibliography ==
- Tannous, Jack (2018). The Making of the Medieval Middle East: Religion, Society, and Simple Believers. Princeton University Press. ISBN 9780691179094.
- Thomas, David Richard; Roggema, Barbara; Sala, Juan Pedro Monferrer (2009). Christian-Muslim Relations: A Bibliographical History (600-900). BRILL. ISBN 9789004169753.
