= Theognostus of Alexandria =

Christian theologian (c. 210 – c. 270)

- Born: c. 210; Alexandria, Egypt
- Died: c. 270; Heliopolis, Egypt

Philosophical work
- Era: Ante-Nicene Fathers
- Region: Christian Philosophy
- School: Platonic, Hellinistic

Theognostus (Ancient Greek: Θεόγνωστος; c. 210 – c. 270) was a late 3rd century Alexandrian theologian. He is known from quotes by Athanasius and Photios I of Constantinople. Philip of Side says that he presided over the school of Alexandria after Pierius (AD 265). Although a disciple of Origen of Alexandria no reference of him can be found by Eusebius or Jerome. The main textual point of reference is derived from Athanasius.

== Works ==
He wrote a seven-volume work called Hypotyposes, extant at the time of Photius' quotation. Some of the more notable quotations of book two appear Arian; the Son is spoken of as a creature, which is to say a created being. In book three his references to the Spirit are unorthodox and reminiscent of Origen. In book five he spoke of angels and devils as embodied.

In books six and seven he treated the Incarnation in a more orthodox manner than book two, and Athanasius regarded him as a useful witness against Arianism. Under the influence of Origen of Alexandria Theognostus expounded on the trinity, divine redemption and the afterlife. His work was very much in line with the Christian Hellenistic philosophy prevalent within the school of Alexandria at the time.

Much of his theology would later be adopted by Gregory of Nyssa. The fragments of Theognostus are collected in Martin Joseph Routh's Reliquiae Sacrae 3:407–422. Translations into English can be found in the Ante-Nicene Fathers (available at WikiSource). Most of the 2nd book was later published in 1902 by Franz Diekamp.

== Exegetical writings ==
Hypotypōseis: The seven books known in Greek as the "Outlines" a title given by Photios I of Constantinople is considered to be Theognostus' principal work. Themes include:

- Book I Creation
- Book II The Divinity of Christ
- Book III The Holy Spirit
- Book IV Angels and Devils
- Books VI & V The Divinity of God
- Book VII A return to creation.
