= Oxford Early Christian Texts =

Oxford Early Christian Texts is the name of a series of books published by Oxford University Press which contain texts from early Christian writers in both their original Latin and Greek and in translation.

== List of books in the series ==
Date of publication	Title	Original author	Editor	ISBN
15 April 1971	Contra Gentes; De Incarnatione	Athanasius	Robert W. Thomson	ISBN 978-0-19-826801-7
19 August 1982	Oratio ad Graecos and Fragments	Tatian	Molly Whittaker	ISBN 978-0-19-826809-3
14 April 1983	Selected Letters	Cyril of Alexandria	Lionel R. Wickham	ISBN 978-0-19-826810-9
4 January 1996	De Doctrina Christiana	St Augustine	R.P.H. Green	ISBN 978-0-19-826334-0
29 August 1996	Letter on the Conversion of the Jews	Severus of Minorca	Scott Bradbury	ISBN 978-0-19-826764-5
8 March 2001	De Bono Coniugali and De Sancta Virginitate	St Augustine	P. G. Walsh	ISBN 978-0-19-826995-3
16 January 2003	Documents from Exile	Maximus the Confessor	Pauline Allen; Bronwen Neil	ISBN 978-0-19-829991-2
11 May 2006	Against the Monophysites: Testimonies of the Saints and Aporiae	Leontius of Jerusalem	Patrick T. R. Gray	ISBN 978-0-19-926644-9
10 December 2009	Complete Works	Priscillian of Avila	Marco Conti	ISBN 978-0-19-956737-9
