= Eustasius of Aosta =

Bishop of Augusta Pretoria (c. 388–c. 454)

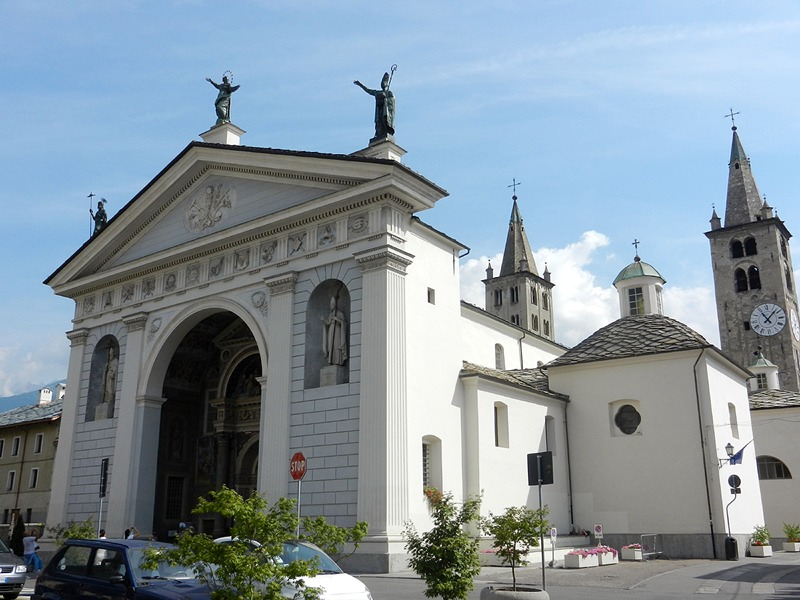
Aosta Cathedral

Saint Eustasius of Aosta (c. 388 – c. 454) was the first bishop of the ancient see of Augusta Pretoria, today Aosta. His name is attached to a letter sent to Pope Leo I by the delegates of the second Synod of Milan (451).

Eustasius is traditionally regarded as the first bishop of the ancient Augusta Pretoria, today Aosta. His name indicates he came from the east, possibly following Eusebius to Vercelli. Pope Benedict XVI thought he was of Sardinian origin. According to St Ambrose, the people of Aosta asked Eusebius to have their own bishop some time after 400 AD, and Eustasius was sent to Aosta as the first bishop. Unfortunately, no details of his ministry have survived.

In 451 he was perhaps prevented from traveling to the synod in Milan because of advanced age, so he sent as his representative Gratus to the Council of Milan. This Gratus succeeded him as bishop of Aosta and honor a saint and his cult overshadowed the first bishop. Indeed, for a long time the first bishop of Aosta was not celebrated in the diocese at all, and even today his cult is purely local. His memorial day is 25 February.
