= Gregory of Cappadocia =

Patriarch of Alexandria from 339 to 345

Gregory of Capadocia
- Patriarch of Alexandria
- Predecessor: Athanasius I
- Successor: Athanasius I

Personal details
- Died: 345

Gregory of Cappadocia served as Patriarch of Alexandria between 339 and 345. The appointment was made due to political pressure on Emperor Constantius II by Bishop Eusebius of Nicomedia, who had been one of the strong opponents of Patriarch Athanasius I and a supporter of Arianism from the very beginning.

Gregory was enthroned during one of the exiles of Patriarch Athanasius I from Alexandria. Most in the Eastern Orthodox Church of Alexandria and Coptic Church deny his papacy and say that Athanasius I was the true patriarch, considering Gregory to be a usurper of the Alexandrian see. Gregory was well spoken and a close friend to the Roman Emperor, and that became the reason as to why he became a "Patriarch" of Alexandria. His Arian views were not favoured in Egypt at the time and to this date the Christians believe that his views are heretical.

He died in June 345, probably from violence.

Preceded by Athanasius I	Patriarch of Alexandria; 339–345	Succeeded by Athanasius I
