= Henry Burgess (priest) =

Henry Burgess (1808 – 10 February 1886) was an English priest.

== Life ==
He was educated at a dissenting college at Stepney, where he studied Hebrew as well as the Classics. After ministering to a nonconformist congregation, he was ordained deacon in 1850 and priest in 1851 by Prince Lee, Bishop of Manchester. He took the degree of Legum Doctor (LLD) at Glasgow University in 1851 and a Doctor of Philosophy PhD at the University of Göttingen in the following year.

He held the perpetual curacy of Clifton Reynes, Buckinghamshire, from 1854 to 1861, when he was appointed by the Lord Chancellor to the vicarage of St Andrew, Whittlesey, Cambridgeshire, in recognition of his services to theological learning. He held it until his death on 10 February 1886.

== Works ==
His major works are:

- A translation from the Syriac language of the Metrical Hymns and Homilies of St Ephrem Syrus, with Philological Notes and Dissertations on the Syrian Metrical Church Literature, 2 vols. 1835.
- The Country Miscellany, 2 vols. 1836–7.
- Poems, 1850, dedicated to the Marchioness of Bute.
- Translation of the Festal Letters of St Athanasius, 1852, a work which, after being long lost in the original Greek, was recovered in an ancient Syriac version, and edited for the Oxford Library of the Fathers by Henry Griffin Williams.
- The Reformed Church of England in its Principles and their legitimate Development, 1869.
- Essays, Biblical and Ecclesiastical, relating chiefly to the Authority and Interpretation of the Holy Scriptures.
- The Art of Preaching and the Composition of Sermons, 1881.

He prepared the second edition of John Kitto's Cyclopædia of Biblical Literature, and he was for some years editor of the Clerical Journal (1854–68) and the Journal of Sacred Literature.
