= Lucifer of Cagliari =

4th-century bishop of Cagliari, Sardinia

Lucifer
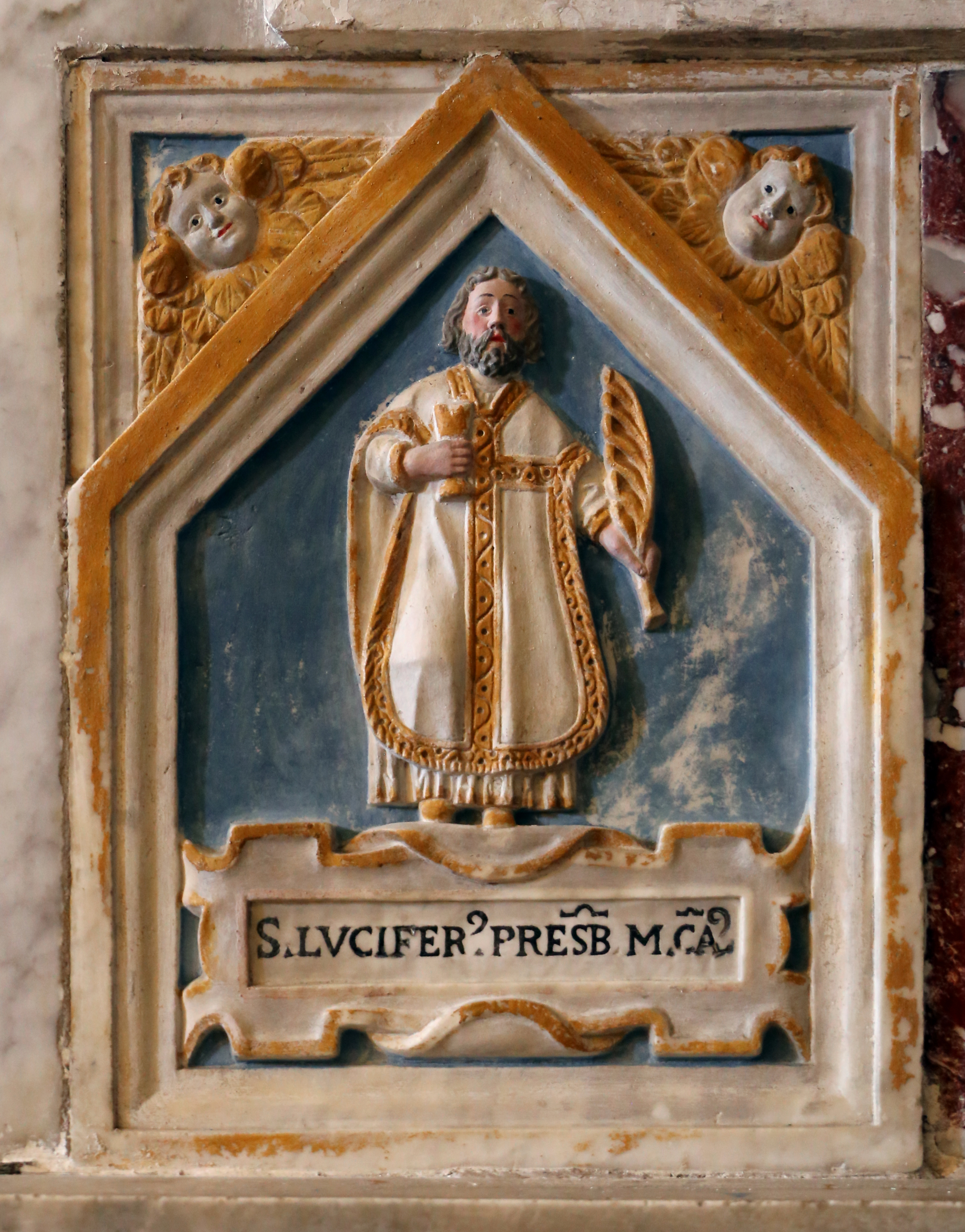
- Born: Early 4th century
- Died: 20 May 370
- Title: Bishop of Cagliari

St. Lucifer of Cagliari (Latin: Lucifer Calaritanus, Italian: Lucifero da Cagliari; died 20 May 370 or 371) was a bishop of Cagliari in Sardinia known for his passionate opposition to Arianism. He is venerated as a Saint in Sardinia.

== Life ==
Lucifer first appears in history as an envoy from Pope Liberius to the Emperor Constantius II, requesting the convening of a church council. At the Council of Milan in 355, he defended Athanasius of Alexandria against Arian attempts to secure his condemnation by Western bishops. It was reported that Constantius II, a supporter of Arian theology, confined Lucifer for three days in the Imperial Palace, where Lucifer continued to argue vehemently on behalf of Athanasius. Along with Eusebius of Vercelli and Dionysius of Milan, Lucifer was exiled for his opposition to the imperial ecclesiastical policy. He was banished first to Germanicia, the see of bishop Eudoxius, thereafter to Palestine and finally to the Thebais in Egypt. While in exile, he wrote fiery pamphlets to the Emperor in which he proclaimed himself to be ready to suffer martyrdom for his beliefs.

A disciple of Saint Eusebius of Rome, he became a scholar in Greek and Hebrew languages, and then was baptized by the Pope Eusebius. St Lucifer wrote a well documented Vita S. Eusebii Vercellensis (from Latin, "Life of Saint Eusebius of Vercelli").

After the death of Constantius and the accession of Julian the Apostate, Lucifer and other expatriated bishops were allowed to return from exile in 361 or 362. However, he would not be reconciled to former Arians.

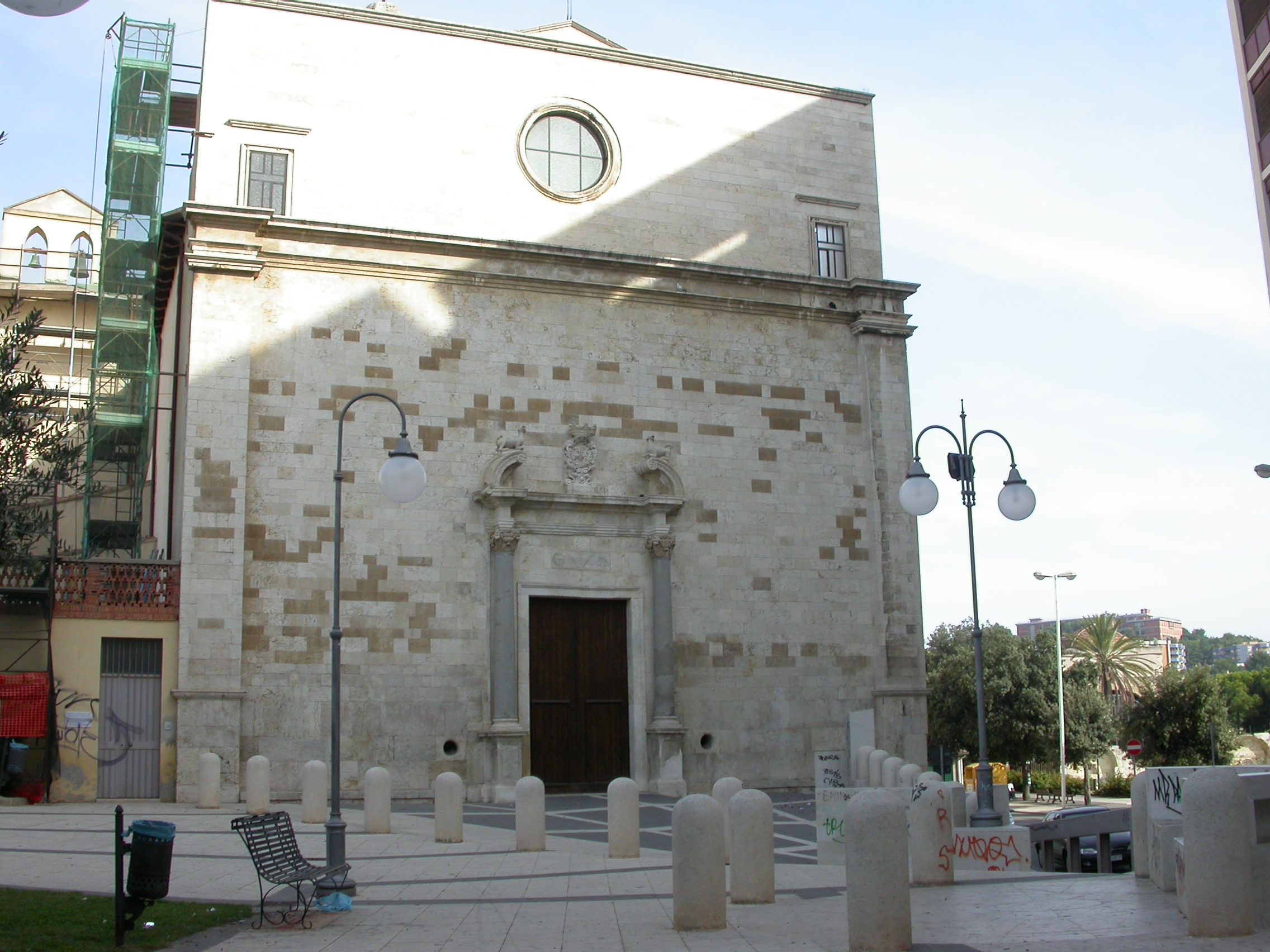
Church of San Lucifero (circa 1660), dedicated to Saint Lucifer. Cagliari, Sardinia

He opposed the Bishop Meletius, who came to accept the Nicene Creed (and for that was driven out by Arians). Although Meletius had the support of many proponents of Nicene theology at Antioch, Lucifer put his support behind the Eustathian party which had unflinchingly stood by the Nicene creed, and prolonged the schism between Meletians and Eustathians by consecrating without licence a Eustathian, Paulinus, as bishop. He subsequently returned to Cagliari where, according to Jerome, he died in 370.

He may have been excommunicated as is hinted in the writings of Ambrose of Milan and Augustine of Hippo, as well as Jerome, who refers to his followers as Luciferians. There is extant a work known as Libellus precum ad Imperatores, written by two Luciferian clergy called Faustinus and Marcellinus. Jerome discusses Lucifer and his supporters in his polemic Altercatio Luciferiani et orthodoxi ("Altercation of a Luciferian and an Orthodox"), as well as describing the bishop's career in De Viris Illustribus (chapter 95).

Alban Butler writes, on the life of Athanasius of Alexandria, that Lucifer of Cagliari and some other bishops refused to accept back the bishops who accepted the Arian position. The lapsed, notwithstanding their repentance, could no longer be admitted in the rank of bishop or priest. St. Athanasius condemned this excessive severity; and in 362 assembled the Council of Alexandria, at which assisted St Eusebius of Vercelli, in his return from banishment from Thebais, and St Asterius of Petra. This synod condemned those who denied the divinity of the Holy Ghost, and decreed that the authors of the Arian heresy should be deposed, and upon their repentance received only to the lay-communion; but those prelates who had fallen into it only by compulsion, and for a short time, should, upon their repentance, retain their sees. (Conc. t. vii. pp. 73 and 680.)

Alban Butler writes of the life of Saint Jerome as he reflects on the history of the Council of Alexandria in 362: "This indulgence of forgiveness, offered to the repentant Bishops, displeased Lucifer, Bishop of Cagliari, a person famous for his zeal and writings against the Arians, in the reign of Constantius. St Jerome composed a dialogue against the Luciferians, in which he plainly demonstrates, by the acts of the Council of Rimini, that in it the bishops were imposed upon." Constantius, for the purpose of wearying out the orthodox bishops (Sulpitius Severus says: E.H.., ii, 41), delayed allowing the bishops home, keeping them there for several months until they finally accepted the Sirmian Creed.

== Works ==
Lucifer of Cagliari's surviving writings, all of which date from the period of his exile, are directed against Arianism and reconciliation with heresy. His works are written in the form of speeches delivered directly to Constantius and repeatedly address the emperor in the second person throughout. His texts quote extensively from the Bible and so are useful as sources for the Vetus Latina. Also extant is a pair of letters which are allegedly correspondence between Lucifer and the emperor's secretary Florentius on the subject of some of Lucifer's inflammatory works that he had sent to Constantius.

=== Textual tradition ===
The editio princeps of his writings was printed by bishop Jean du Tillet (lat. Ioannes Tilius; Paris, 1568). In modern times they were edited by Wilhelm von Hartel (CSEL, vol. 14, 1886) and Gerardus Frederik Diercks (Corpus Christianorum, Series Latina, vol. 8, 1978). When Hartel prepared his edition, only one manuscript with Lucifer's works (Vaticanus Reginensis 133 = V) was known. But in 1893 another one was found in the Sainte-Geneviève Library in Paris (Genouefensis 1351 = G), and only since 1921 have scholars paid attention to it, thanks to dom André Wilmart's article. There was also a third manuscript (Corbiensis deperditus), which is mentioned in a library catalogue of Corbie Abbey. Moreover, there is a note in G indicating that it was transcribed from a very old book in Corbie (ad exemplar vetustissimum abbatie antique corbye in dyocesi Ambianensi).

Diercks in his edition concludes that G is an indirect copy of V, through a lost Corbie intermediary. However, Lambert Ferreres showed that some good readings are transmitted only in G, which is difficult to explain if it depends on V.

=== List of works ===
- De non conveniendo cum haereticis (On not Coming Together with Heretics)
- De regibus apostaticis (On Apostate Kings)
- Quia absentem nemo debet iudicare nec damnare, sive De Athanasio (That No One Ought to be Judged or Condemned while Absent, or Concerning Athanasius), 2 books
- De non parcendo in Deum delinquentibus (On not Sparing those who Commit Offences Against God)
- Moriundum esse pro Dei filio (The Necessity of Dying for the Son of God)
- Epistulae Luciferi et aliorum (Letters by Lucifer and Others)
- Fides sancti Luciferi episcopi (Faith of Saint Bishop Lucifer), dubious

== Veneration ==
Lucifer's status as a Saint had been a matter of controversy. According to John Henry Blunt's 1874 Dictionary of Sects, Heresies, Ecclesiastical Parties, and Schools of Religious Thought,

The Church of Cagliari celebrated the feast of a Saint Lucifer on the 20th of May. Two Archbishops of Sardinia wrote for and against the sanctity of Lucifer. The Congregation of the Inquisition imposed silence on both parties, and decreed that the veneration of Lucifer should stand as it was. The Bollandists defend this decree of the Congregation ... contending that the Lucifer in question is not the author of the schism, but another Lucifer who suffered martyrdom in the persecution of the Vandals."

A chapel in Cagliari's cathedral is dedicated to a Saint Lucifer. Marie Josephine Louise of Savoy, wife of Louis XVIII, is buried there.

Opinions about Lucifer vary among Catholics who know of him; some consider him to have been "the champion of correct belief against Arianism and friend of St. Athanasius," while others consider him to have been a religious fanatic who ferociously berated his opponents.

His optional memorial is observed in the Church of Cagliari on the 20th of May.

== See also ==
- Athanasius of Alexandria
