= Eusebius of Vercelli =

Bishop and saint (c. 283–371)

Saint Eusebius of Vercelli
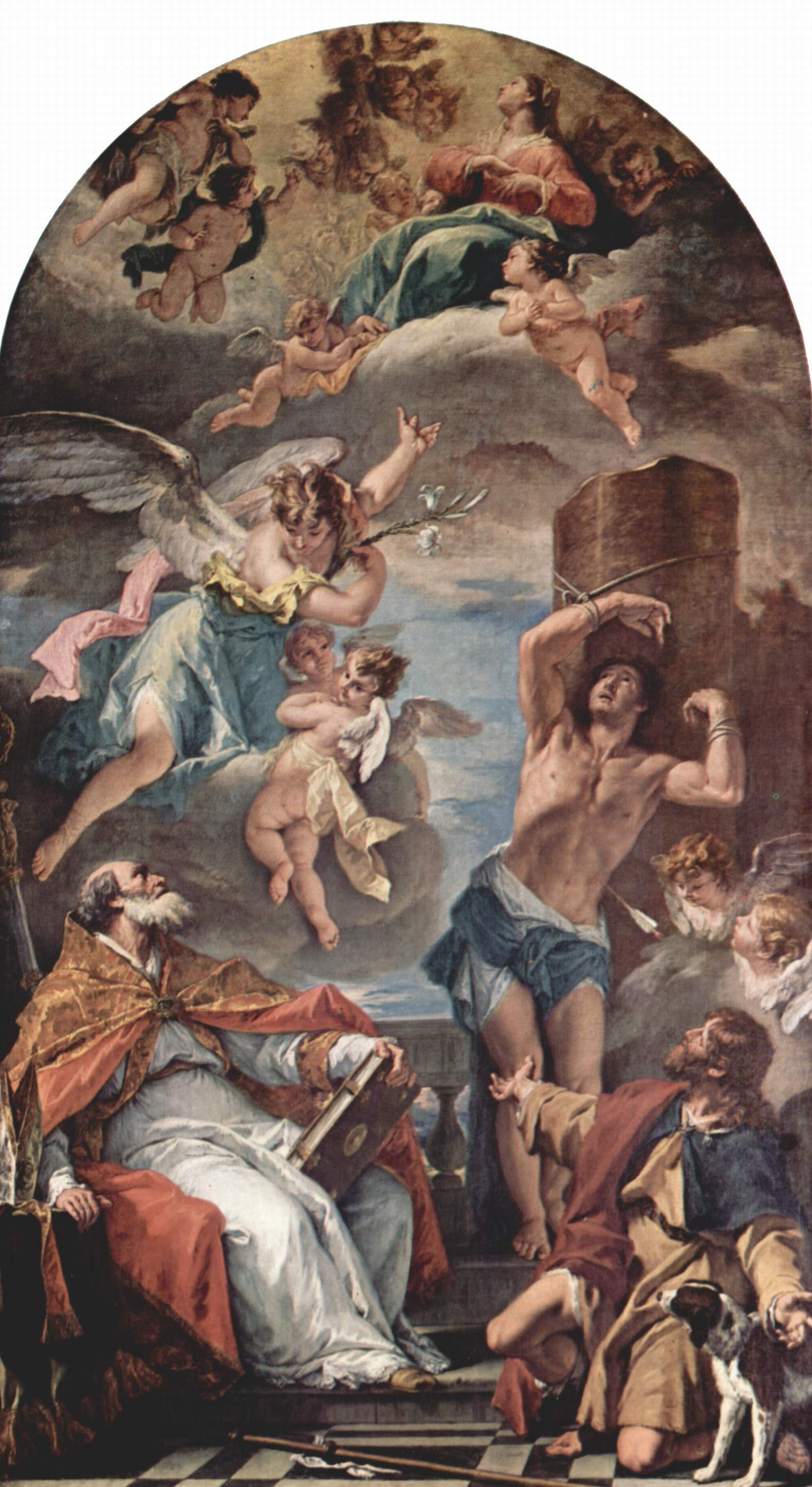
- The Virgin Mary in Glory with Archangel Gabriel, and Saints Eusebius of Vercelli (seated), Saint Sebastian, and Saint Roch, Sebastiano Ricci.

Bishop and Confessor of the Faith
- Born: c. 2 March 283; Sardinia
- Died: 1 August 371 (aged 88); Vercelli, Piemonte
- Venerated in: Catholic Church; Eastern Orthodox Church Anglican Communion
- Feast: 2 August; 15 December (General Roman Calendar 1602–1728); 16 December (General Roman Calendar 1729–1969)
- Patronage: Vercelli

Eusebius of Vercelli (c. 2 March 283 – 1 August 371) was a bishop from Sardinia and is counted a saint. Along with Athanasius, he affirmed the divinity of Jesus against Arianism.

== Biography ==
Eusebius was born in Sardinia, in 283. After his father's martyrdom, he was taken to Rome by his mother, where he later became a lector. He became the first bishop in Vercelli (in northern Italy), probably sometime in the early- to mid-340s. According to a letter of Ambrose to the congregation in Vercelli two decades after Eusebius' death, the local leaders recognized his piety and thus elected him rather than local candidates (Epistola lxiii, Ad Vercellenses). Inspired by St Athanasius's Life of St Anthony, he founded a priestly community in Vercelli that resembled a monastic community. This coenobium, in turn, inspired others such as Gaudentius of Novara, Eustasius of Aosta, and Maximus of Turin. He was the first bishop to live in common with the clergy, devoting his best energies to form them in piety and zeal. For this reason, the Canons Regular of St. Augustine honour him along with Augustine as their founder.

In 354, Pope Liberius asked Eusebius to join Bishop Lucifer of Cagliari in carrying a request to the Emperor Constantius II at Milan, pleading for the emperor to convoke a council to end the dissensions over the status of Athanasius of Alexandria and the matter of Arianism. The synod was held in Milan in 355. Eusebius attended part of the council, but refused to condemn Athanasius and so was exiled, first to Scythopolis in Syria, under the watchful eye of the Arian bishop Patrophilus, whom Eusebius calls his jailer, then to Cappadocia, and lastly to the Thebaid, in Upper Egypt. Several letters surrounding the council written to or by Eusebius still survive, as do two letters written by him during his exile.

In the latter place, Eusebius was dragged through the streets and persecuted in many ways but never gave up the Catholic faith. Upon the accession of Julian, the exiled bishops were free to return to their sees. Eusebius passed through Alexandria and there attended Athanasius' synod of 362 which confirmed the divinity of the Holy Spirit and the orthodox doctrine concerning the Incarnation. The synod also agreed both to deal mildly with the repentant bishops who had signed Arianizing creeds under pressure and to impose severe penalties upon the leaders of several of the Arianizing factions.

While still on his way home, Eusebius took the synod's decisions to Antioch and hoped to reconcile the schism there. The church was divided between adherents of Eustathius of Antioch, who had been deposed and exiled by the Arians in 331, and those of the Meletians. Since Meletius' election in 361 was brought about chiefly by the Arians, the Eustathians would not recognize him, although he solemnly proclaimed his orthodox faith after his episcopal consecration. The Alexandrian synod had desired that Eusebius should reconcile the Eustathians with Bishop Meletius, by purging his election of whatever might have been irregular in it, but Eusebius found that Lucifer of Cagliari had also passed that way, and had unilaterally consecrated Paulinus, the leader of the Eustathians, as Bishop of Antioch.

Unable to reconcile the factions, he continued towards home, visiting other churches along the way in the interest of promulgating and enforcing the orthodox faith. Once back in Vercelli in 363, he continued to be a leader with Hilary of Poitiers in defeating Arianism in the Western Church, and was one of the chief opponents of the Arian bishop Auxentius of Milan. He died in 370 or 371.

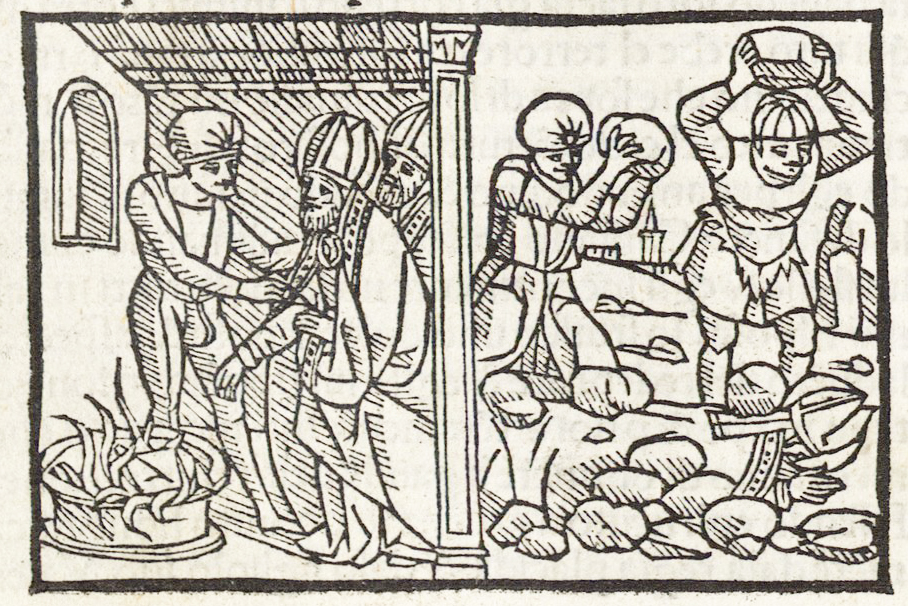
The martyrdom of Eusebius according to the Golden Legend (1497).

Although in the Middle Ages he was sometimes referred to as a martyr, this was more to honour the sufferings he endured in standing up for his faith. Later legends of his martyrdom have no historical basis. The Roman Catholic Church celebrates his feast on 2 August. His former feast day of 16 December roughly coincided with his elevation as bishop. His current feast day roughly coincides with the anniversary of his death. Vercelli Cathedral is dedicated to him.

In a General Audience in October 2007, Pope Benedict XVI observed,

Therefore, Pastors, Eusebius said, must urge the faithful not to consider the cities of the world as their permanent dwelling place but to seek the future city, the definitive heavenly Jerusalem. This "eschatological reserve" enables Pastors and faithful to preserve the proper scale of values without ever submitting to the fashions of the moment and the unjust claims of the current political power. The authentic scale of values – Eusebius' whole life seems to say – does not come from emperors of the past or of today but from Jesus Christ,...

== Works ==
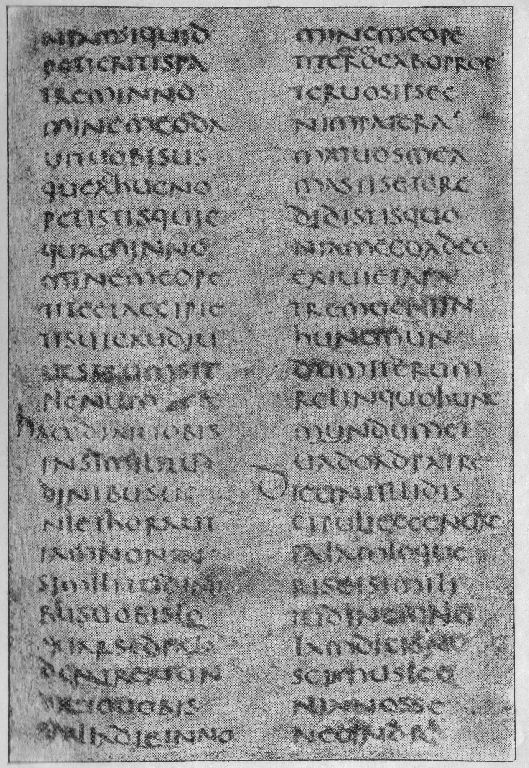
A part of the Codex Vercellensis, believed to have been written by Eusebius in the year 370.

- Three short letters of Eusebius are printed in Migne, Pat.Lat., XII, 947-54 and X, 713-14.
- Jerome (Of Famous Men, c. lvi, and Epistle lxi, n. 2) ascribes to him a Latin translation of a commentary on the Psalms, written originally in Greek by Eusebius of Caesarea; but this work has been lost.
- In the cathedral at Vercelli is preserved the Codex Vercellensis, the earliest manuscript of the old Latin Gospels ("Codex a"), which was believed to have been written by Eusebius, though now scholars tend to doubt it.
- Krüger (Lucifer, Bischof von Calaris, Leipzig, 1886, 118–30) ascribes to Eusebius a baptismal oration by Caspari (Quellen sur Geschichte des Taufsymbols, Christiania, 1869, II, 132-40).
- The confession of faith "Des. Trinitate confessio", P.L., XII, 959–968, sometimes ascribed to Eusebius, is spurious.

== Bibliography ==
- Covolo, Enrico; Uglione, Renato; Vian, Giovanni Maria (edd.). (1997). Eusebio di Vercelli e il suo tempo. (in Italian). (Rome: Libreria Ateneo Salesiana 1997).
- Dattrino, L., "S. Eusebio di Vercelli: vescovo „martire“? vescovo „monaco“?," (in Italian), in: Augustinianum 24 (1984) 167-187.
- N. Everett, "Narrating the Life of Eusebius of Vercelli", in R. Balzaretti and E.M. Tyler (eds), Narrative and History in the Early Medieval West (Turnhout, 2006: Brepols), pp. 133–165.
- Nicholas Everett, Patron Saints of Early Medieval Italy AD c.350–800 (PIMS/ Durham University Press, 2016), pp.171–205.
- Ferrari, M. (1996). "Eusebio di Vercelli e il suo tempo," (in Italian), in: Bollettino storico Vercellese 46 (1996), pp. 113-125.
- Milano, E. (1987). "Eusebio di Vercelli, vescovo metropolita. Leggenda o realtà storica?", (in Italian), in: Italia Medioevale e Umanistica 30 (1987), 313–322.
- Simonetti, M. (1997). "Eusebio nella controversia ariana," (in Italian), in: Covolo, E., Uglione, R. and Vian, G. M. (eds.) Eusebio di Vercelli ed il suo tempo, pp. 155–179.
- Zangara, V. (1997). "Eusebio di Vercelli e Massimo di Torino: tra storia e agiografia," (in Italian), in: Eusebio di Vercelli e il suo tempo, pp. 257–321.
