= Synod of Milan =

The Synod of Milan or Council of Milan may refer to any of several synods which occurred in late Roman Mediolanum or medieval Milan in northern Italy's Po valley:

== Synod of 345 ==
In 353 or 354, Pope Liberius wrote thus: "Eight years ago the Eusebian deputies, Eudoxius and Martyrius (who came to the West with the formula Greek: μακρόστικος), refused to anathematize the Arian doctrine at Milan". But the Synod of Milan here alluded to is placed about the year 345, soon after the Synod of Sardica.

Maximin of Trier was at this synod.

== Synod of 355 ==
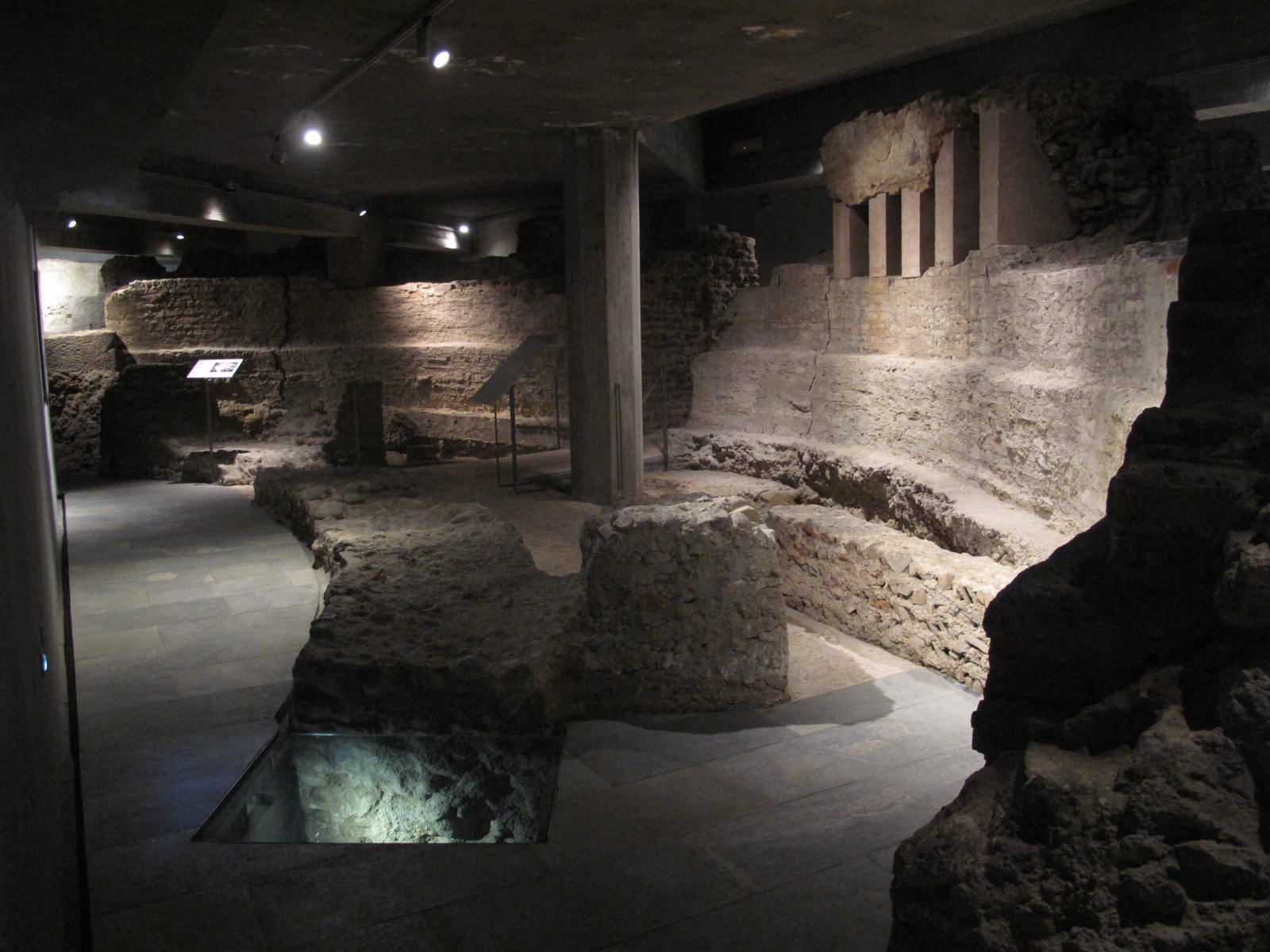
Ruins of the Basilica Maior where was held the 355 synod

Lucifer of Cagliari was deputed by Pope Liberius, with the priest Pancratius and the deacon Hilary, to request the Emperor Constantius to convene a council, to deal with the accusations directed against St. Athanasius and his previous condemnation. This council was convened at Milan in the newly erected Basilica Nova (or Basilica Maior or St. Tecla). The council however did not follow the hopes of the Pope due to the overwhelming number of Arians bishops and the initial forced absence of the champion of the Nicaean faith, Eusebius of Vercelli. Lucifer there defended the Bishop of Alexandria (Athanasius) with much passion and in very violent language, thus furnishing the adversaries of the great Alexandrian with a pretext for resentment and further violence, and causing a new condemnation of Athanasius. The bishop of Milan Dionysius initially seemed ready to follow the Arians in condemning Athanasius, accused not of heresy but of lese-majesty against the Emperor.

With the arrival of Eusebius the situation changed: Eusebius requested an immediate subscription of the Nicaean faith by the bishops. Eusebius, Lucifer and Dionysius signed, but the Arian bishop Valens of Mursia violently shredded the act of faith. Constantius, unaccustomed to independence on the part of the bishops, moved the synod to his palace and grievously maltreated the papal embassy. Hilary was flogged and the exiled along with Pancratius and the two Nicaean bishops. The synod, now governed by the Arian bishops of the court of Constantius, ended supporting Arian statements.

== Synod of 389 ==
Augustine's "On the Good of Marriage" was written against somewhat that still remained of the heresy of Jovinian. He mentions this error in b. ii. c. 23, de Nuptiis et Conc. Jovinianus, he says, who a few years since tried to found a new heresy, said that the Catholics favored the Manichæans, because in opposition to him they preferred holy Virginity to Marriage. "That heresy took its rise from one Jovinianus, a monk, in our own time, when we were yet young". And he adds that it was soon overborne and extinguished, say about A.D. 390, having been condemned first at Rome, then at Milan. There are letters of Pope Siricius on the subject to the Church of Milan, and the answer sent him by the Synod of Milan, at which St. Ambrose presided. Jerome had refuted Jovinian, but was said to have attempted the defense of the excellency of the virgin state, at the expense of condemning marriage.

St. Maximus of Turin was at a "synod of Milan" in 389 at which Jovinianus was condemned, according to his ninth homily.

== Synod of 451 ==
In 451, St. Maximus of Turin was again at a synod in Milan where the bishops of Northern Italy accepted the celebrated letter (epistola dogmatica) of Pope Leo I, setting forth the orthodox doctrine of the Incarnation against the Nestorians and Eutychians. Among nineteen subscribers Maximus is the eighth, and since the order was determined by age, Maximus must then have been about seventy years old.

== Synod of 860 ==
A synod that took place in Milan in 860 summoned Ingiltrud, wife of Boso, to appear before it because she had left her husband for a paramour. Pope Nicholas I commanded the bishops in the dominions of Charles the Bald to excommunicate her unless she returned to her husband. As she paid no attention to the summons, she was put under the ban.

== Other ==
- Holy Synod of Milan

== See also ==
- Milan as an early center of Christianity
