= June 21 (Eastern Orthodox liturgics) =

Day in the Eastern Orthodox liturgical calendar

Eastern Orthodox liturgical calendar
June 20	June 21	June 22
June 21 O.S. ≍ July 4 N.S. June 21 N.S ≍ June 8 O.S.

An Eastern Orthodox cross

June 21 in Eastern Orthodox liturgical calendars is a feast day and a day of commemoration of saints and martyrs. Although some Orthodox churches use the Revised Julian Calendar and others use the traditional Julian calendar, the fixed commemorations for their respective June 21 are broadly the same, no matter which calendar is used. (Note: Despite the dates being the same, the days to which they refer typically differ by 13 days. The notation Old Style or O.S. is sometimes used to indicate a date in the traditional Julian Calendar (the "Old Calendar"). The notation New Style or N.S. indicates a date in the Revised Julian calendar (the "New Calendar").)

== Saints ==
- Hieromartyr Tertius of Iconium (Terence), Apostle of the Seventy, Bishop of Iconium (1st century) (Note: "At Iconium, in Lycaonia, St. Terentius, bishop and martyr.")
- Martyr Julian and his wife Basilissa, and with them Martyrs Celsius, his mother Marcianilla, Anastasius, the priest Anthony, seven brothers, and twenty prison guards, of Antinoe in Egypt (283-305) (see also: January 8 )
- Martyr Julian of Tarsus in Cilicia (c. 284-305)
- Martyr Aphrodisius in Cilicia. (Note: "THE Greek Menaea contains an absurd story of this martyr, how a lioness was let loose upon him in the arena, but instead of devouring him, she stood up on her hind-legs and preached to the people, many of whom were converted by the singular preacher.")
- Martyrs Kyriakos and Apollinarios, of Africa. (Note: "In Africa, the holy martyrs Cyriacus and Apollinaris.")
- Saints Julius of Novara, presbyter, and his brother Julian the Deacon (5th century)
- Martyr Archil II, King of Georgia (718 or 744)

== Pre-Schism Western saints ==
- Saints Rufinus and Martia, martyrs in one of the early persecutions in Syracuse in Sicily. (Note: "At Syracuse, in Sicily, the birthday of the holy martyrs Rufinus and Martia.")
- Saint Urciscenus, Seventh Bishop of Pavia in Italy c 183-216 (c. 216) (Note: "At Pavia, St. Urciscenus, bishop and confessor.")
- Saint Martin of Tongeren, seventh Bishop of Tongeren in Belgium, venerated as the Apostle of the Hesbaye region in Brabant (c. 350)
- Saint Demetria, a virgin-martyr in Rome, sister of St Bibiana and daughter of Sts Flavian and Dafrosa (363) (Note: "Also, at Rome, St. Demetria, virgin, who was crowned with martyrdom under Julian the Apostate.")
- Saint Alban of Mainz, a Greek priest from Naxos, sent into exile by the Arians, he preached the Gospel in Germany around Mainz, then martyred by the Arians (c. 400) (Note: "At Mayence, St. Alban, martyr, who was made worthy of the crown of life, after long labors and severe combats.")
- Saint Cormac Ua Liatháin (Cormac of the Sea; Corbmac), a disciple of St Columba and Abbot of Durrow Monastery, Ireland (c. 590)
- Saint Méen (Mevenus, Mewan, Maine), a disciple of St Samson, whom he accompanied to Brittany, and founded the monastery of Saint-Méon (617)
- Saint Agofredus, brother of St Leutfrid (Leffroi), and monk at Holy Cross (La-Croix-Saint-Leuffroi), a monastery near Evreux in the north of France (738)
- Saint Leutfrid (Leufroi), founder of the monastery La Croix-Saint-Ouen (later called Saint-Leufroy) near Evreux in France, where he was abbot for nearly fifty years (738) (Note: "In the diocese of Evreux, St. Leutfrid, abbot." He cared for poor children.)
- Saint Engelmund of Velsen, an English-born Benedictine missionary to Frisia (c. 739) (Note: Born in England, he became a monk at a very early age and then priest and abbot. He went to Friesland in Holland where he successfully preached with St Willibrord at Velsen, six miles north of Haarlem.)
- Saint Dominic of Comacchio, a monk at Comacchio near Venice in Italy (c. 820)
- Saint Rodulf (Rudolph, Raoul, Ralph), Abbot, and Archbishop of Bourges, Gaul (866) (Note: He became a monk at the monastery of Solignac in France and later Abbot of St Medard in Soissons. In 840 he became Bishop of Bourges, founding monasteries and doing good works.)
- Saint Wolfrid, founder of the monastery of Hohentwiel in Germany (c. 990)

== Post-Schism Orthodox saints ==
- Venerable Anastasia of Serbia (Anna), mother of St. Sava (1200)
- Martyr Theodore, right-believing prince of Starodub (1330)
- Martyr Luarsab II, King of Georgia (1622)
- New Martyr Nicetas of Nisyros, near Rhodes, at Chios (1732)

=== New martyrs and confessors ===
- New Hieromartyr John Budrin (1918)
- Venerable New Hieroconfessor George (Lavrov), Archimandrite, of Kaluga (1932)
- New Hieromartyr Jonah (Sankov), Hieromonk, of Alpatievo, Moscow (1938)
- New Hieromartyrs Alexis Skvortsov, Paul Uspensky and Nicholas Rozanov, Priests (1938)
- New Martyr Nikita Sukharev (1942)

== Other commemorations ==
- Uncovering of the relics (1996) of St. Maximus the Greek, of Russia (1556)
- Repose of Schemamonk John "the Muscovite," of Valaam (1933)
- Discovery of the Icon of Panagia Eleousa in Xyniada of Domokou (1962)

== Icon gallery ==
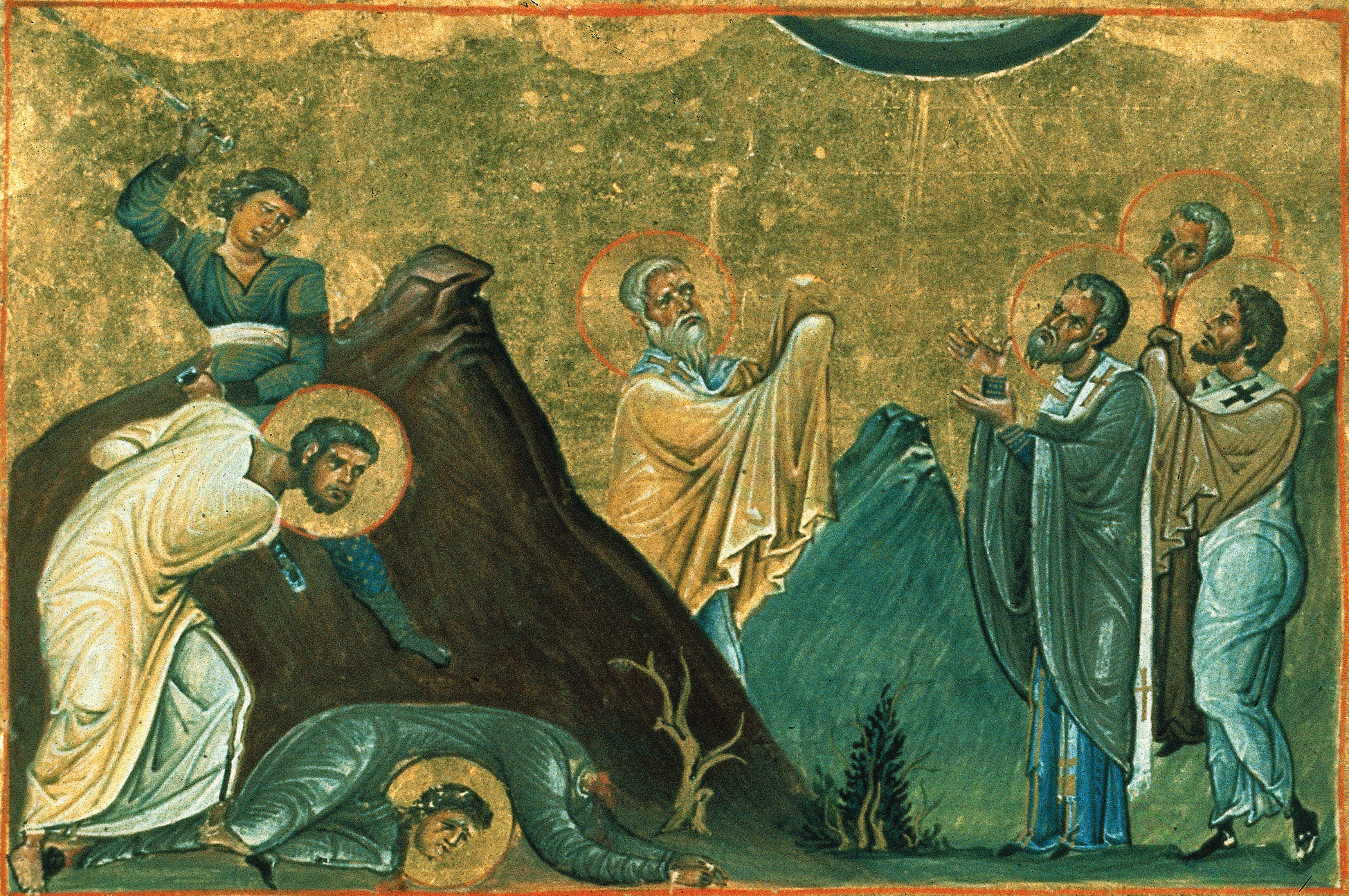
Erastus, Olympus, Rhodion, Sosipater, Quartus and Tertius.

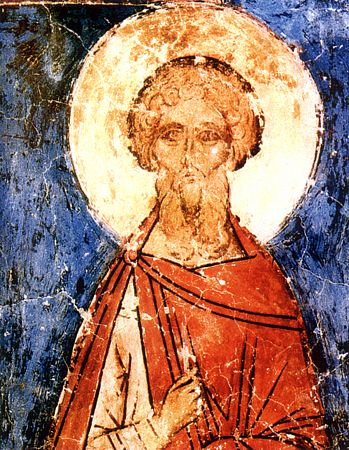
Martyr Julian of Tarsus in Cilicia.

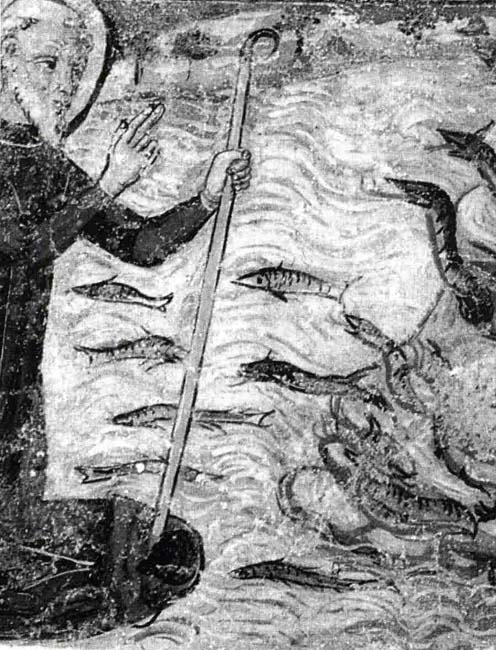
St. Julius of Novara, presbyter.

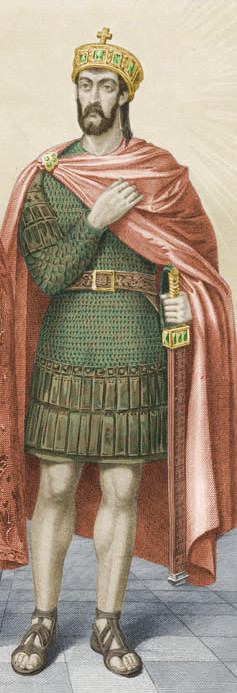
Martyr Archil II, King of Georgia.

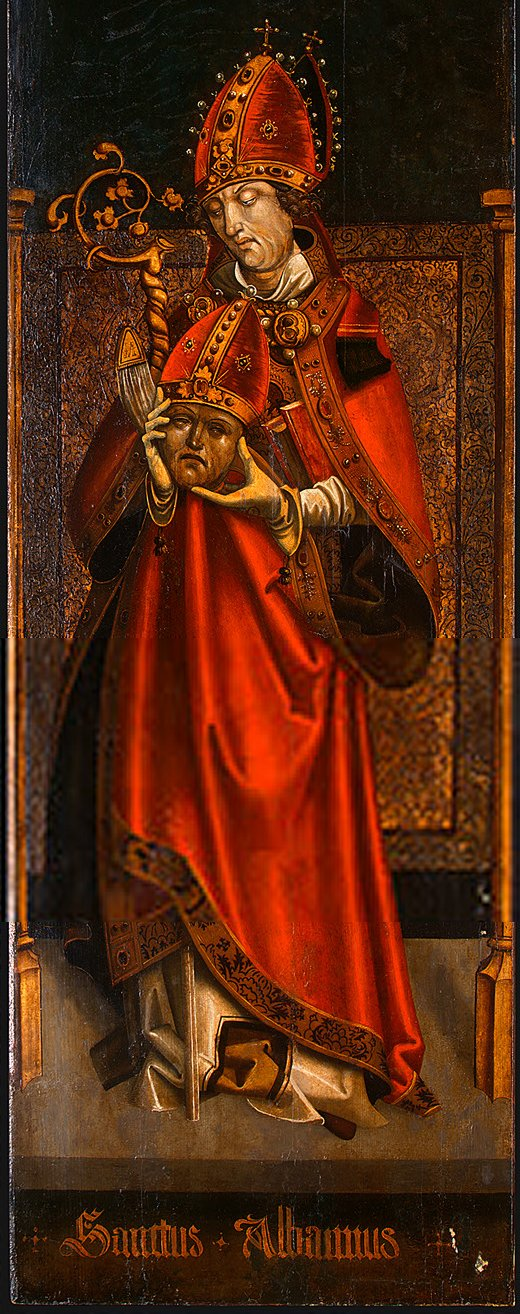
St. Alban of Mainz.

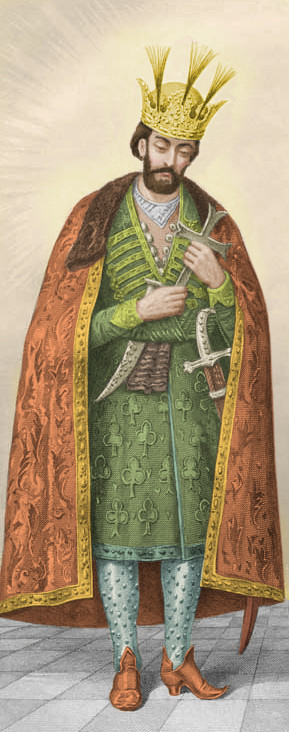
Martyr Luarsab II, King of Georgia.

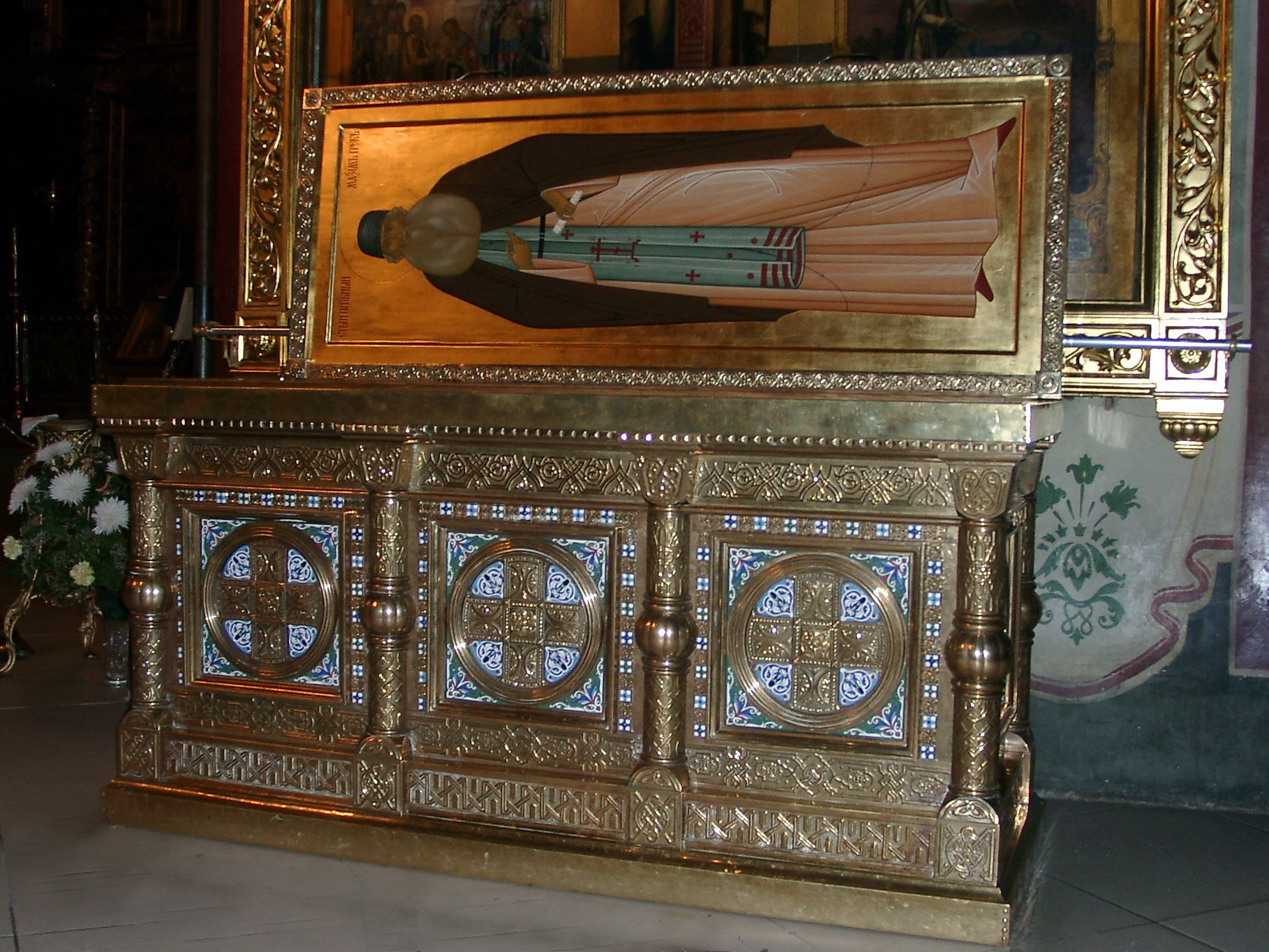
Shrine with the relics of St. Maximus the Greek.

== Sources ==
- June 21/July 4. Orthodox Calendar (PRAVOSLAVIE.RU).
- July 4 / June 21. HOLY TRINITY RUSSIAN ORTHODOX CHURCH (A parish of the Patriarchate of Moscow).
- June 21. OCA - The Lives of the Saints.
- The Autonomous Orthodox Metropolia of Western Europe and the Americas (ROCOR). St. Hilarion Calendar of Saints for the year of our Lord 2004. St. Hilarion Press (Austin, TX). p. 46.
- The Twenty-First Day of the Month of June. Orthodoxy in China.
- June 21. Latin Saints of the Orthodox Patriarchate of Rome.
- The Roman Martyrology. Transl. by the Archbishop of Baltimore. Last Edition, According to the Copy Printed at Rome in 1914. Revised Edition, with the Imprimatur of His Eminence Cardinal Gibbons. Baltimore: John Murphy Company, 1916. pp. 180–181.
- Rev. Richard Stanton. A Menology of England and Wales, or, Brief Memorials of the Ancient British and English Saints Arranged According to the Calendar, Together with the Martyrs of the 16th and 17th Centuries. London: Burns & Oates, 1892. pp. 278–281.

Greek Sources

- Great Synaxaristes: (in Greek) 21 ΙΟΥΝΙΟΥ. ΜΕΓΑΣ ΣΥΝΑΞΑΡΙΣΤΗΣ.
- (in Greek) Συναξαριστής. 21 Ιουνίου. ECCLESIA.GR. (H ΕΚΚΛΗΣΙΑ ΤΗΣ ΕΛΛΑΔΟΣ).
- (in Greek) 21 Ιουνίου. Αποστολική Διακονία της Εκκλησίας της Ελλάδος (Apostoliki Diakonia of the Church of Greece).
- (in Greek) 21/06/2018. Ορθόδοξος Συναξαριστής.

Russian Sources

- (in Russian) 4 июля (21 июня). Православная Энциклопедия под редакцией Патриарха Московского и всея Руси Кирилла (электронная версия). (Orthodox Encyclopedia - Pravenc.ru).
- (in Russian) 21 июня по старому стилю / 4 июля по новому стилю. Русская Православная Церковь - Православный церковный календарь на 2017 год.
- (in Russian) 21 июня (ст.ст.) 4 июля 2014 (нов. ст.). Русская Православная Церковь Отдел внешних церковных связей. (DECR).
