= List of Christians martyred during the reign of Diocletian =

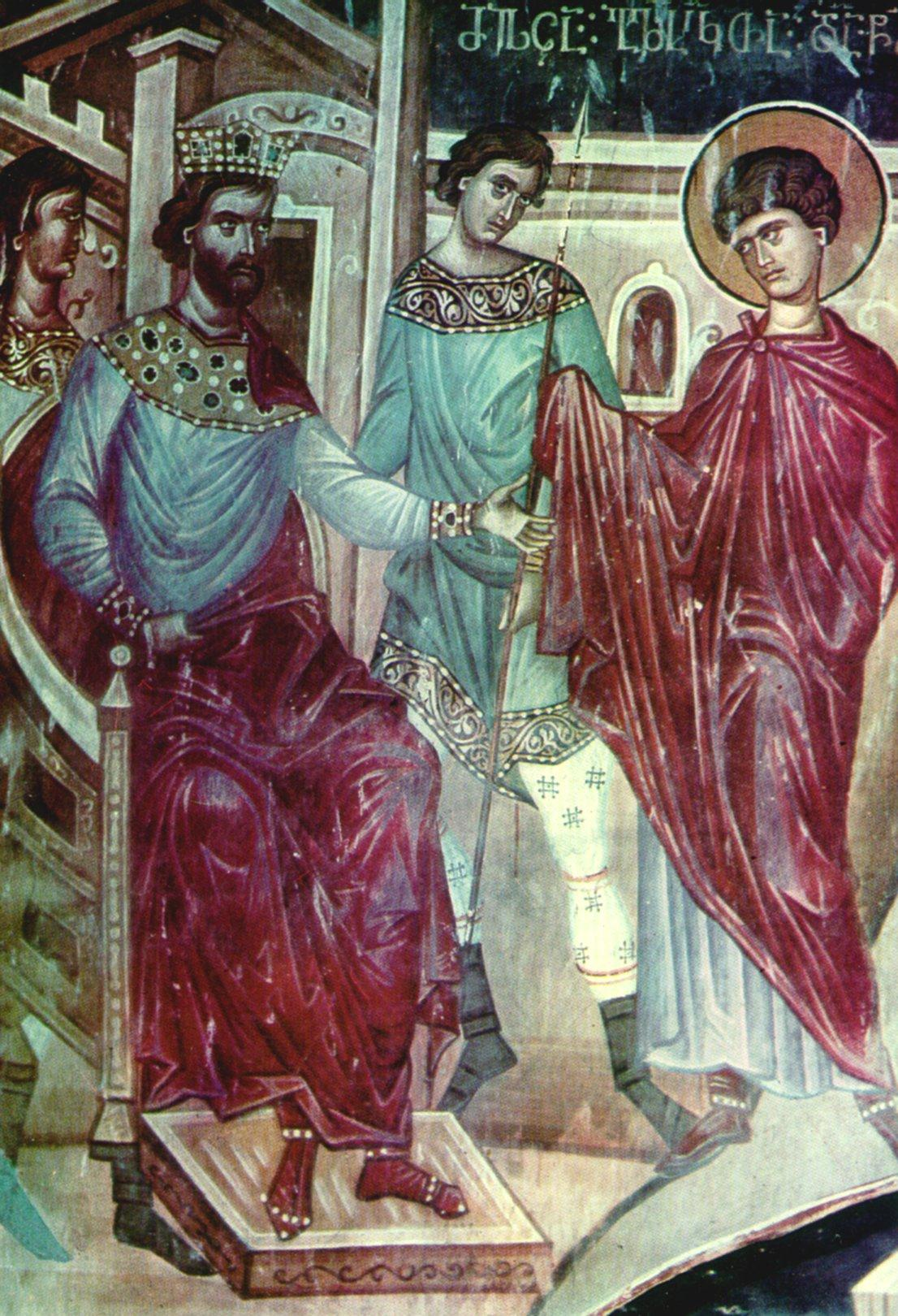
Saint George before Diocletian, in a 14th-century mural in Ubisi

The reign of the emperor Diocletian (284−305) marked the final widespread persecution of Christians in the Roman Empire. The most intense period of violence came after Diocletian issued an edict in 303 more strictly enforcing adherence to the traditional religious practices of Rome in conjunction with the Imperial cult. Modern historians estimate that during this period, known as the Diocletianic or Great Persecution and extending several years beyond the reign of Diocletian, as many as 3,000−3,500 Christians were executed under the authority of Imperial edicts.

The church historian Eusebius, a Bishop of Caesarea who lived through both the "Little Peace" of the Church and the Great Persecution, is a major source for identifying Christian martyrs in this period. Martyr narratives flourished later as a genre of Christian literature, but are not contemporary with the persecutions and are often of dubious historicity. This article lists both historical and legendary figures traditionally identified as martyrs during the reign of Diocletian.

== Martyrs of Palestine ==
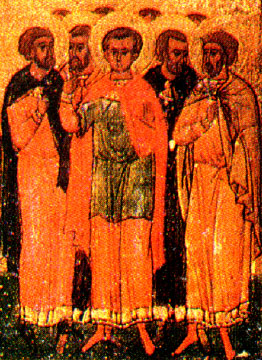
Icon of Saint Timolaus and Companions

Eusebius recorded many accounts of martyrdoms in Caesarea in his book The Martyrs of Palestine. Here are just a few of the names of martyrs as recorded by Eusebius in his work The Martyrs of Palestine

=== Procopius of Scythopolis July 7, 303 AD ===
Procopius of Scythopolis was killed in 303 after being betrayed by his mother, and subsequently imprisoned, tortured and beheaded. During his final days, he is quoted as receiving another vision from God and receiving a new name of Procopius. He would later be venerated as a saint.

=== Timolaus and Companions 303 AD ===
Timolaus was followed 5 young men, recorded as "Companions". Urban, governor of Caesarea, had fed 2 Christians to wild beasts after refusing to perform sacrifices to Roman gods. Urban planned to hold more executions in similar fashions, so Timolaus and 5 others "went in haste" to Urban, and tied their own hands behind themselves while declaring themselves as Christians and demanding to be put to death in the fashion of the earlier 2 Christians.

=== Alphaeus and Zacchaeus 303/304 AD ===
The Emperor Diocletian had ordered that all in the Empire should perform worship and sacrifices to the Roman gods. The authorities in Caesarea were so keen that all should obey this order that, according to the shorter recension of Eusebius' Martyrs of Palestine, they seized one Christian leader by the hands, led him to the altar and thrust the offering into his right hand. He was then dismissed as if he had performed the sacrifice. It was agreed by those in charge that they would attest that two others had made the offerings, even though they had not. Another Christian opened his mouth to say that he refused to worship the Roman gods when the guards struck him across the face, prevented him from speaking, and dismissed him, so that, says Eusebius, of the many brought in from the area to perform acts of worship to the Roman gods or die, only two, Alphaeus and Zaccheus, "were honored with the crown of the holy martyrs."

=== Romanus of Caesarea 303/304 AD ===
During a pagan festival, he upbraided the participants for worshiping idols. Taken prisoner, he was condemned to death by fire, and was bound to the stake. When rain extinguished the flames, Romanus was brought before Emperor Galerius who was then in Antioch. At the emperor's command Romanus' tongue was cut out. Tortured in various ways in prison he was finally strangled.

=== Aphian April 2, 305 AD ===
According to his legend, he was only eighteen when he entered the temple at Caesarea Maritima, where the prefect Urbanus was offering sacrifice. Seizing the outstretched hand that was presenting the incense, he reproached the magistrate for his idolatrous act. The guards fell upon him furiously and, after cruelly torturing him, flung him into a dungeon. The next day, he was brought before the prefect, torn with iron claws, beaten with clubs, and burned over a slow fire, and then sent back to confinement. After three days, he was again taken from prison and thrown into the sea with stones tied to his feet. Eusebius, an eyewitness, declares that an earthquake simultaneously shook the city, and that the sea flung up his corpse on the shore.

=== Silvanus of Gaze 311 AD ===
During the Diocletian Persecution he was condemned to work as a slave in the copper mines of Phaeno. By that time he was already old and soon weakened under the atrocious work in the mines, making him incapable of continue to work though he encouraged his fellow Christians to remain strong in their faith. When it was decided that those who were incapable of working in the mines were to be killed, Silvanus and 39 other Christians were martyred. Silvanus was beheaded and was known as hieromartyr as he had become bishop of Gaza.

== Martyrs of Nicomedia ==
In his Church History, Eusebius discusses the martyrdoms at Nicomedia, naming two:

=== Gorgonius of Nicomedia, 304 ===
According to one version of the legend, Diocletian, wishing to expose Christians in his household, ordered everyone to pay honor to the Roman gods; if they refused, they would be exposed as Christians. The first to be exposed was Diocletian's butler, Peter, surnamed Cubicularius ("valet, chamberlain"), who was strung up, his flesh torn from his bones. Two Christians, Dorotheus, an imperial chamberlain, and Gorgonius, an army officer, protested this treatment, and were also martyred, together with another official, named Migdonius. In the meantime, Peter was boiled or burned alive, or “roasted on a gridiron.”

=== Anthimus of Nicomedia, 304 ===
At the request of members of his congregation, Anthimus took refuge in the small village of Omana, where he provided aid to survivors and sent letters exhorting the Christians to stand firm. When the soldiers of Maximinus were sent to find him, he welcomed them and fed them before revealing who he was. (The detail referring to Maximinus suggests that two persecutions have been conflated.) Amazed at his kindness, the soldiers promised him to tell Maximinus that they had not found him, but Anthimus returned with them, and converted and baptized them along the way.

== Attested in early sources ==
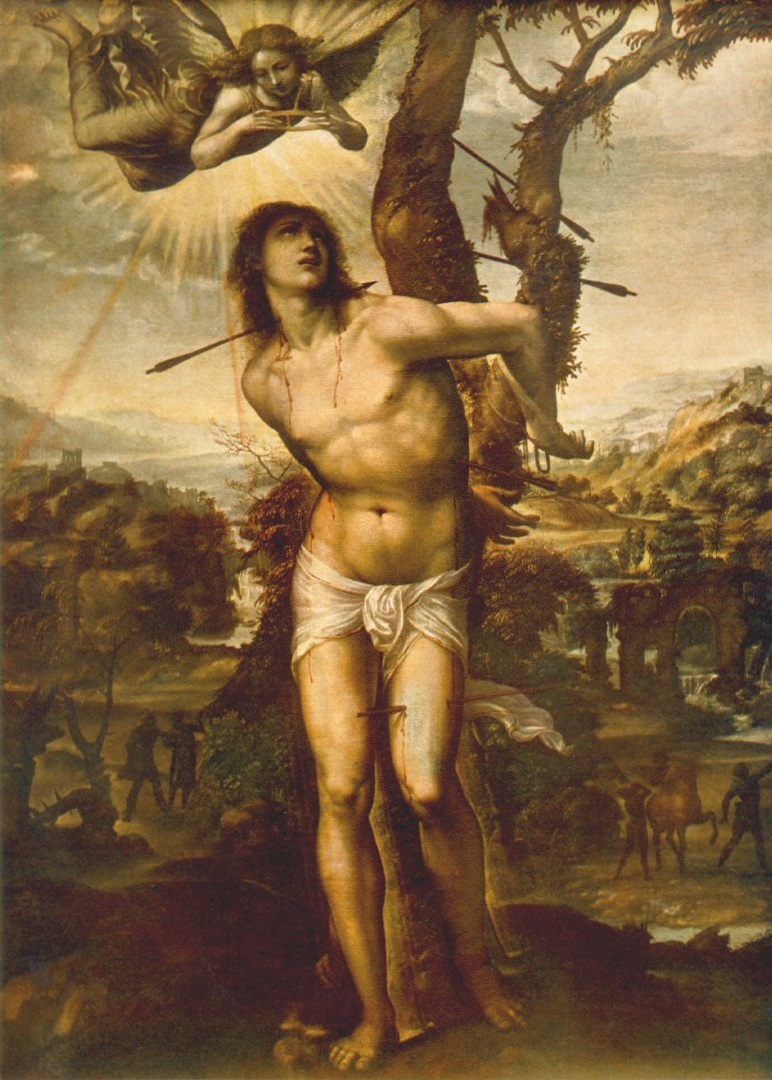
Saint Sebastian and Madonna with Saints (1525) by Il Sodoma

- Shmona and Gurya, c. 297, as recorded in the Acts of Shmona and of Gurya (c. 309)
- Saint Sebastian, c. 288, first attested by Ambrose, bishop of Milan 374–397
- Saint Faith, 287 or 290, prior to the official start of the Diocletianic Persecution but during his reign. Attested by Jerome in Martyrologium Hieronymianum
- Euphemia, 303, attested in the Martyrologium Hieronymianum and the Fasti vindobonenses
- Felix and Adauctus, c. 303, attested in the works of Pope Gregory I (late 6th century) and in a miraculous martyrology by Ado in the 9th century that may have drawn on a 4th-century record by Pope Damasus I
- Agnes of Rome, c. 304, recorded by Ambrose
- Marcellinus and Peter, 304, first recorded by Damasus

== Others ==
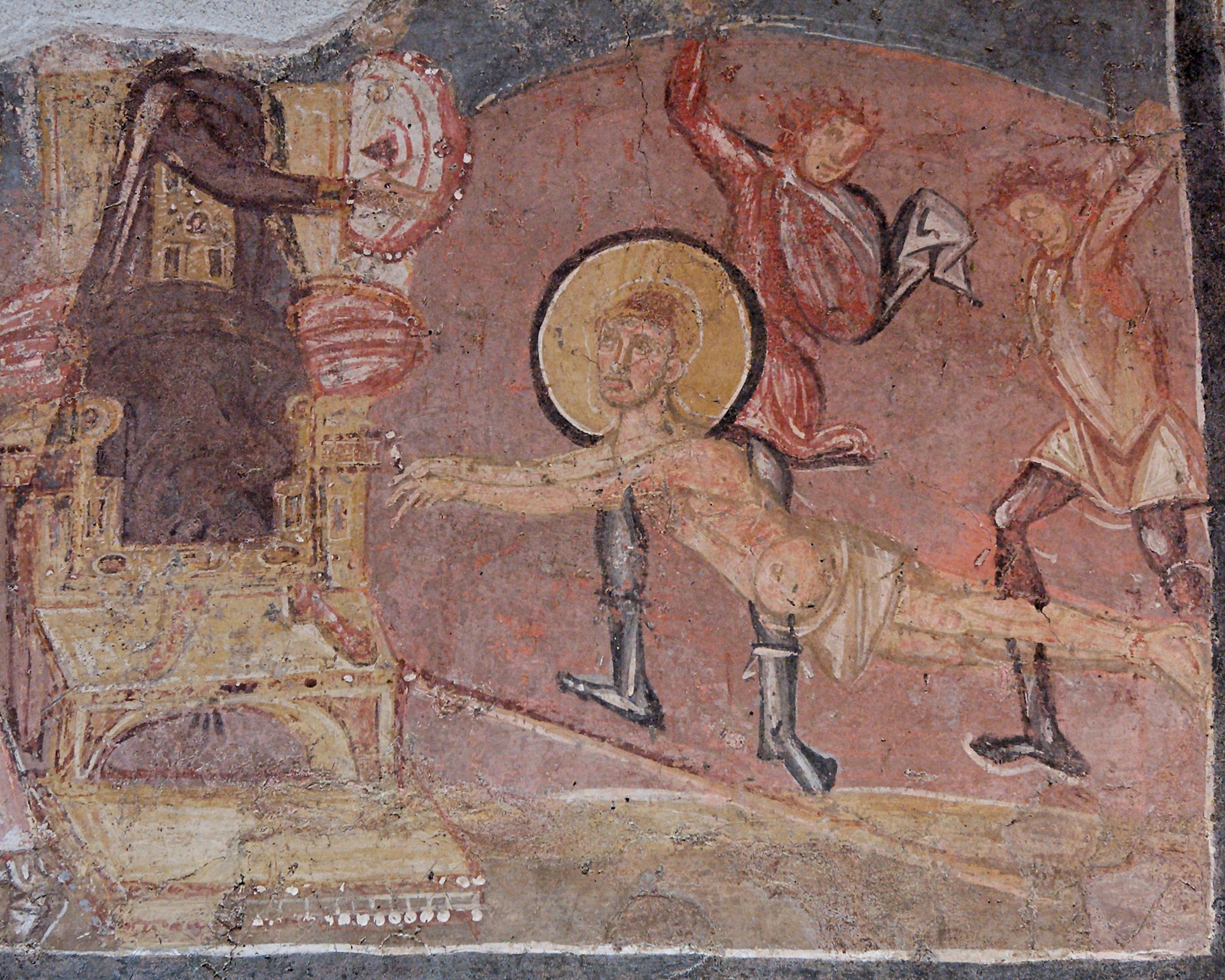
The Flagellation of Erasmus of Formiae, from the crypt of Santa Maria in Via Lata (c. 750)

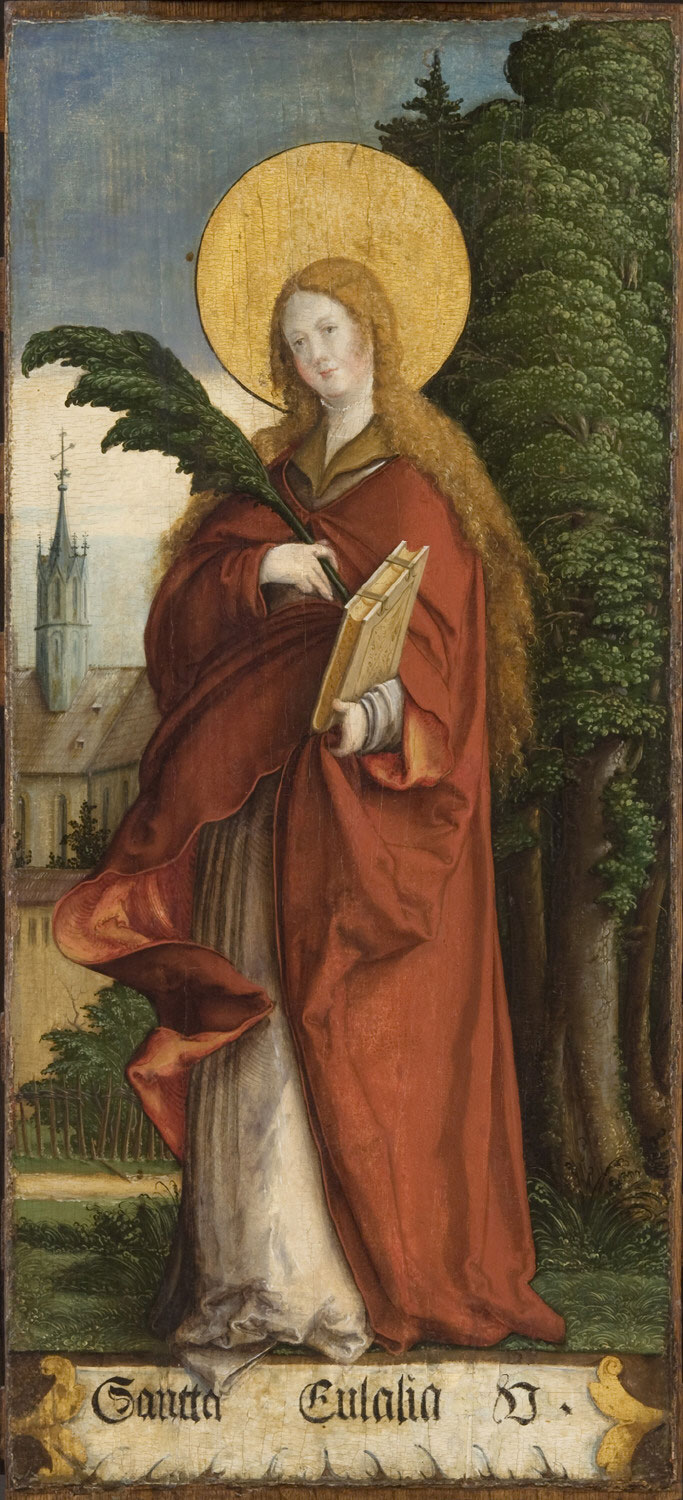
Eulalia of Mérida with the martyr's palm (Master of Meßkirch, 1535–40)

- Chrysanthus and Daria, according to the Martyrologium Hieronymianum
- Nicasius, Quirinus, Scubiculus, and Pientia, according to tradition
- Castulus and his wife Irene of Rome, according to tradition
- Mark and Marcellian, according to tradition
- Saint Tiburtius and Saint Susanna, according to legend
- Victor of Marseilles, according to tradition
- Pope Caius, according to legend
- Gabinus, died c. 300, according to tradition
- Sabinus of Spoleto, c. 300, according to tradition
- Anthony of Antioch, Celsus and Marcionilla, according to tradition
- Eulalia of Barcelona, 12 February 303, according to tradition
- Quirinus of Tegernsee, according to legend
- Engratia, 303, according to tradition
- George, 23 April 303, according to tradition
- Victor Maurus, c. 303, according to tradition
- Agathius, 8 May 303, according to tradition
- Erasmus of Formiae, c. 303, according to tradition
- Vitus, according to legend
- Cyriacus, according to tradition
- Alexander of Bergamo, according to legend
- Anastasius of Antioch, Julian and Basilissa, according to tradition
- Lucy, 304, according to tradition
- Vincent of Saragossa, c. 304, according to tradition
- Victoria of Albitina, c. 304, according to tradition
- Agape, Chionia, and Irene, 304, according to tradition
- Fidelis of Como, c. 304, according to tradition
- Saint Florian, c. 304, according to tradition
- Acisclus of Córdoba, 304, according to tradition
- Leocadia of Toledo, c. 304, according to tradition
- Quiricus and Julietta, 304, according to tradition
- Eulalia of Mérida, according to tradition
- Proculus of Pozzuoli, and Januarius, c. 305, according to tradition
- Vincent, Orontius, and Victor 305, according to tradition
- Chrysogonus, according to tradition
- Cantius, Cantianus, and Cantianilla, 304, reported by Maximus of Turin and Venantius Fortunatus
- Cessianus, 303
- Acacius of Sebaste, according to tradition
- Anastasia of Sirmium, according to tradition
- Saint Kyriaki, 289, according to tradition
- Archelais and Companions
- Philomena, according to tradition
- Pancras of Rome, according to tradition
- Pantaleon of Nicomedia, according to St Alphonsus Liguori
- Verissimus, Maxima, and Julia, c. 303, first attested in the Martyrology of Usuard (8th century)

== See also ==
- List of Christian women of the patristic age
