= Leutfred =

Leutfred is a masculine given name of Germanic origin. Based on the roots liud- and -frid, it can be spelled many other ways. Common are Leudefred, Leutfrid, Liutfrid, Luitfrid and Luitfred. Also attested in medieval sources are Litifrid, Leutfred, Leodofred, Leodifred, Leotfrid, Liutifred, Liutefrid, Liutefred, Liutfrith, Liudfrith, Liuthfred, Luidfrid, Litfrit, Littefrid, Leufred and Liufreth. The Old English form is Leodfridh. The family name Liutfridingas, meaning descendents of Liutfrid, is also attested.

Persons with the name include:

- Leudefred (duke of Alamannia) (deposed 587)
- Leutfridus of Évreux (died 738)
- Liutfrid, Duke of Alsace (died 742)
- Luitfrid II of the Sundgau (died 802)
- Litifred I (bishop of Pavia) (r. 864–874)
- Litifred II (bishop of Pavia) (r. c. 939 – 967)
- Luitfred of Aoste (fl. 969), bishop
- Liutfried II of Winterthur (fl. 930–970)
- Litifredo (bishop of Novara) (died 1151)
- Leutfrid Signer (1897–1963), Swiss Capuchin priest and educator
- Luitfried Salvini-Plawen (1939–2014), Austrian professor of zoology
