= Anastasius of Antioch (martyr) =

Saint Anastasius
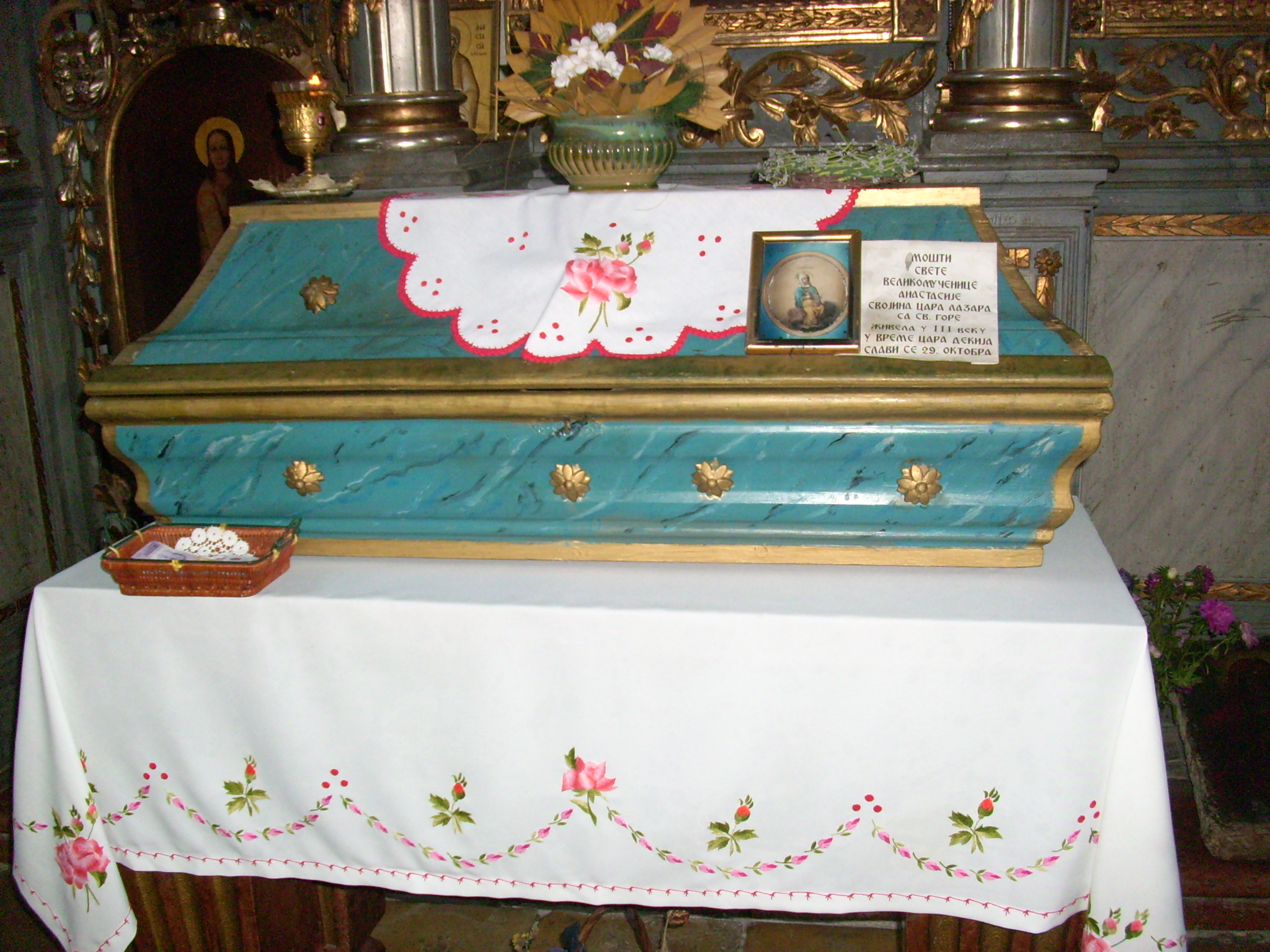
- Relics at Ravanica Monastery, Serbia

Martyr
- Died: 302; Antioch (modern-day Antakya, Hatay, Turkey)
- Venerated in: Roman Catholic Church Eastern Orthodox Church
- Canonized: Pre-Congregation
- Feast: 9 January Roman Catholic 8 January Eastern Orthodox

Anastasius (Greek: Άναστάσιος) was a Christian convert who suffered martyrdom with Anthony, Julian, Celsus and Marcionilla, during the Diocletianic Persecution. He is supposed to have converted after being raised from the dead by Saint Julian of Antioch. His memorial is on 9 January. Anastasius is one of the 140 Colonnade saints which adorn St. Peter's Square. His relics are interred at the Ravanica Monastery in Serbia.
