= Julian and Basilissa =

Chrystian Martyrs

Saints Julian and Basilissa
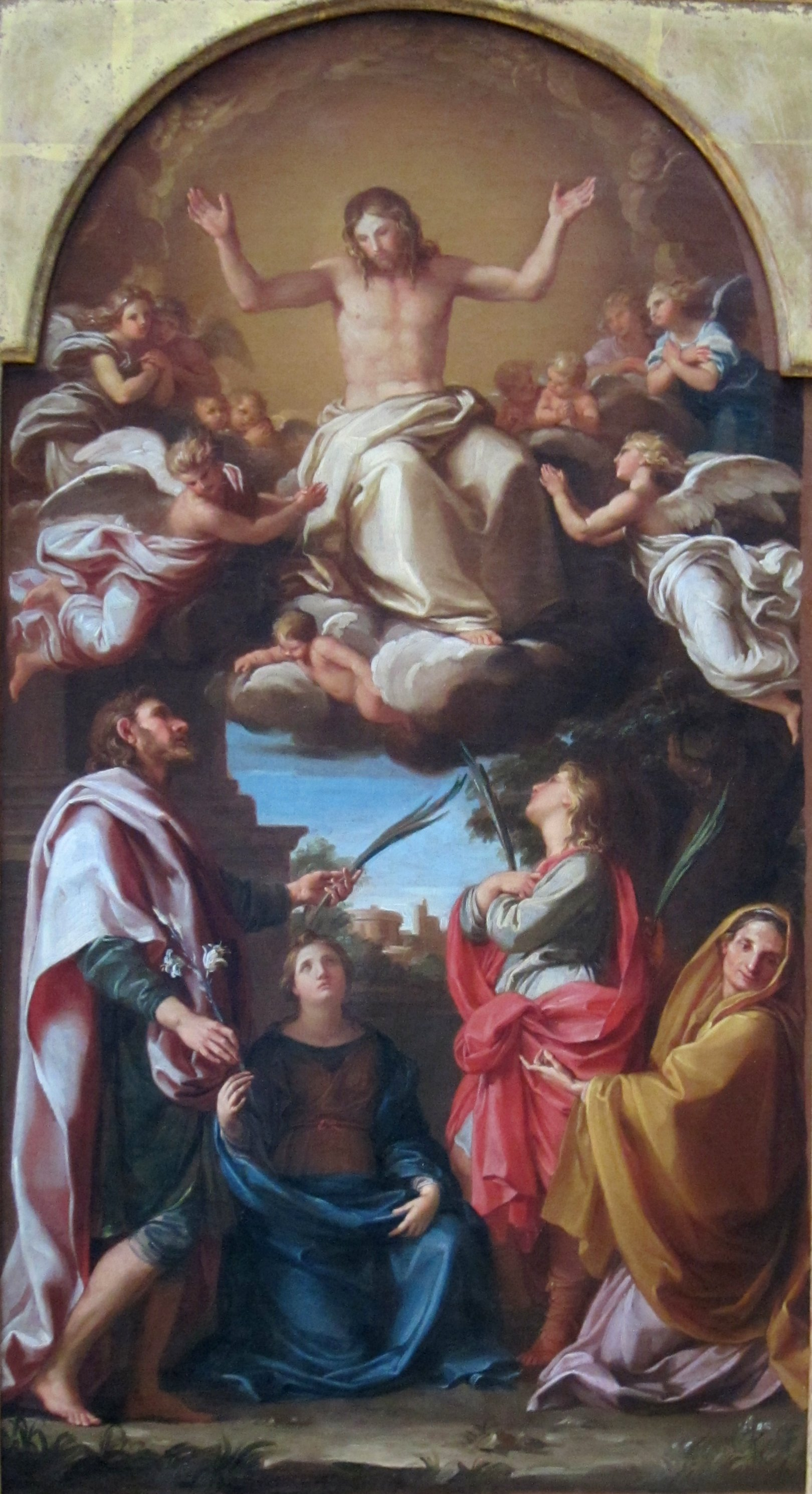
- Christ with Saints Julian and Basilissa, Celsus and Marcionilla, Pompeo Batoni, 1736-8.
- Died: ~304 AD
- Venerated in: Roman Catholic Church Eastern Orthodox Church
- Feast: January 9; January 6; January 7 (this last date according to calendars of the Old Hispanic liturgy, such as that in the Antiphonary of León)
- Attributes: palm of martyrdom
- Patronage: Basilissa is invoked against chilblains

See also Saint Julian

Julian and Basilissa (Greek: Ίουλιανός & Βασίλισσα, died c. 304) were husband and wife, and are venerated as saints in the Roman Catholic Church and the Eastern Orthodox Church. They were Christian martyrs who died at either Antioch or, more probably, at Antinoe, in the reign of Diocletian, early in the fourth century, on 6 January, according to the Roman Martyrology, or 8 January, according to the Greek Menaea.

There exists no historically certain data relating to these two personages, and more than once this Julian of Antinoe has been confounded with Julian of Cilicia. The confusion is easily explained by the fact that thirty-nine saints of this name are mentioned in the Roman Martyrology, eight of whom are commemorated in the one month of January. But little is known of this saint, aside from the exaggerations of his Acts.

== Legend ==
Forced by his family to marry, he agreed with his spouse, Basilissa, that they should both preserve their virginity, and further encouraged her to found a convent for women, of which she became the superior, while he himself gathered a large number of monks and undertook their direction. (Note: In fact, the idea of monks (or nuns) living together in communities is attributed to Pachomius the Great, who lived decades later.) The two converted their home into a hospital which could house up to 1,000 people (thus, Julian is often confused with Julian the Hospitaller).

Basilissa, after having stood severe persecutions, died in peace; Julian survived her many years, but was martyred, (together with Celsus a youth, Antony a priest, Anastatius, and Marcianilla the mother of Celsus) under the Persecutions of Diocletian.

== Julian's martyrdom ==
During the persecution of Diocletian he was arrested, tortured, and put to death at Antioch, in Syria, by the order of the governor, Martian, according to the Latins, at Antinoe, in Egypt, according to the Greeks, which seems more probable. Unfortunately, as with most saints lives the exact historical details are hard to parse from the religious tropes and maxims.

Celsus, the young son of Marcionilla, was martyred along with Julian. The priest Anthony (Antony) was martyred at the same time, as well as a convert and neophyte named Anastasius. Marcionilla's seven brothers are also said to have been killed.

== Veneration ==
In any case, these two must have enjoyed a great reputation in antiquity, and their veneration was well established before the eighth century. In the Martyrologium Hieronymianum they are mentioned under 6 January; Usuard, Ado, Notker of St Gall, and others place them under the ninth, and Rabanus Maurus under the thirteenth of the same month, while Vandelbert puts them under 13 February, and the Menology of Canisius under 21 June, the day to which the Greek Menaea assign St. Julian of Caesarea. There used to exist at Constantinople a church under the invocation of these saints, the dedication of which is inscribed in the Greek Calendar under 5 July.

Only a fragment of Ælfric's Passion of St. Julian and His Wife Basilissa from his Lives of the Saints has survived, but the traditional legend is there: the two vow not to consummate their marriage on their wedding night, and devote themselves to clænnysse ("chastity"). Julian suffers martyrdom by beheading.
