= Agofredus =

Agofredus, also known as Aifroy, (died 738) was a French monk and saint. His memorial is June 21.

== Life ==
A Benedictine known throughout Normandy for his holiness, he was the brother of St. Leutfridus (Leufroy), whom he succeeded as abbot of the Benedictine monastery at La-Croix Saint-Ouen in June 738.
