= Anthony of Antioch =

Christian martyr

Saint Anthony

Martyr
- Born: 266 AD
- Died: 302 AD; Antioch (modern-day Antakya, Hatay, Turkey)
- Venerated in: Roman Catholic Church; Eastern Orthodox Church
- Canonized: Pre-Congregation
- Feast: 9 January (Roman Catholic); 8 January (Eastern Orthodox)

Anthony (Greek: Ἀντώνιος; died 302 AD) was an early Christian priest who suffered martyrdom with Anastasius, Julian, Celsus and Marcionilla during the Diocletianic Persecution. Denouncing the Roman way of life, he lived as a desert hermit, practiced celibacy, lived off roots and plants, and shunned any visitors he received. Anthony wished to live his life in complete solidarity with God.
