= Archelais and Companions =

Saints Archelais, Thecla, and Susanna were Christian virgins of the Romagna region in Northern Italy. During the Diocletianic Persecution in the 3rd century, the virgins disguised themselves as men, cut their hair, and escaped to a remote area in Campagna in Southern Italy. They continue to live as ascetics, practicing fasting and prayer, using their God-given gift of healing, treating the local inhabitants, and converting many pagans to Christianity. When the district's governor heard about the virgins' healings, he arrested them and brought them to Salerno. He threatened Archelais with torture if she did not offer sacrifice to idols, and when she refused, he ordered her "to be torn apart by hungry lions, but the beasts meekly lay at her feet". The governor ordered the lions killed, and put the virgins in prison.

Archelais was tortured; first she was suspended from a tree, and then she was raked with iron utensils and hot tar was poured on her wounds. According to tradition, she prayed more loudly, "and suddenly a light shone over her and a voice was heard, 'Fear not, for I am with you' ". Her torturers also tried to crush her with a large stone, but an angel pushed it to the other side and crushed the torturers instead. A judge ordered soldiers to behead all three virgins, but they dared not harm them, and the virgins told them, "If you do not fulfill the command, you shall have no respect from us". All three were then beheaded, in 293. Their feast day is January 19.
