= Urciscenus =

Italian Roman Catholic saint

Saint Urciscenus

Bishop of Pavia
- Died: 216
- Venerated in: Roman Catholic Church, Orthodox Church
- Canonized: Pre-congregation
- Feast: 21 June

Urciscenus was Bishop of Pavia, from around 183 until his death in 216. He is believed to have led the see of Pavia during a period of increased persecutions.
