= Celsus and Marcionilla =

Saints Celsus and Marcionilla
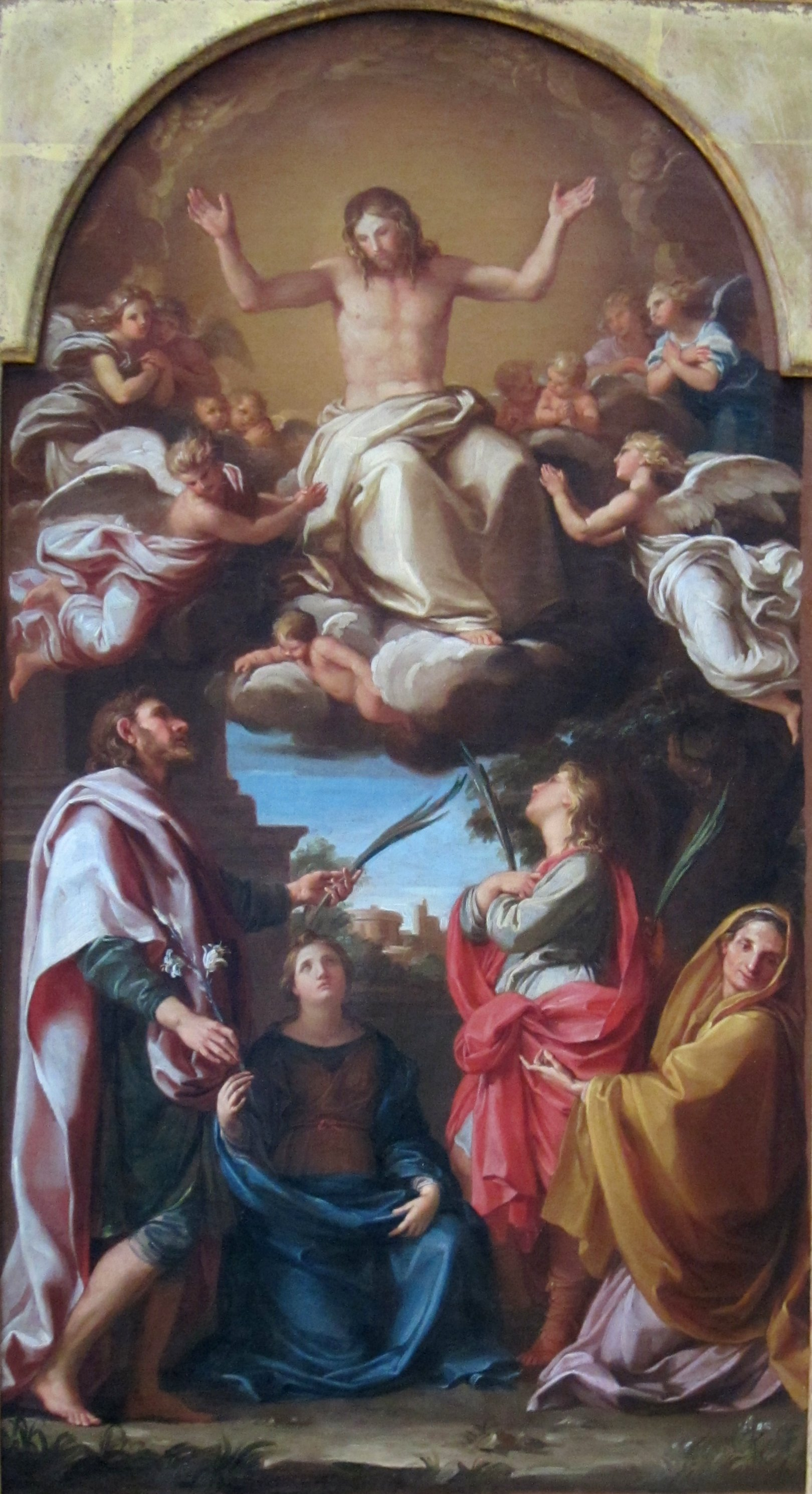
- Christ with Saints Julian and Basilissa, Celsus and Marcionilla, Pompeo Batoni, 1736-8.

Martyrs
- Died: 302; Antioch
- Venerated in: Roman Catholic Church Eastern Orthodox Church
- Canonized: Pre-Congregation
- Feast: 9 January Roman Catholic, 8 January Eastern Orthodox

Celsus and Marcionilla (Greek: Κέλσος & Μαρκιονίλλα) were early Christian martyrs. Marcionilla was a matron, and Celsus was her little son. Together with Anastasius, Anthony, Julian and others they suffered martyrdom in Antioch during the Diocletianic Persecution.
