= Julian of Antioch =

4th-century Christian martyr and saint

Saint Julian of Antioch
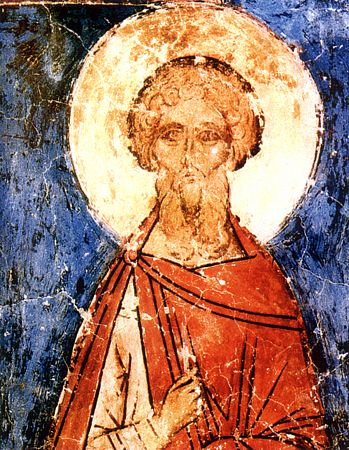

Martyr
- Died: ~305 AD
- Venerated in: Eastern Orthodox Church Roman Catholic Church
- Feast: June 21 (Eastern Orthodox); March 16 (Roman Catholicism)
- Attributes: portrayed as being cast into the sea in a sack full of serpents and scorpions. He may also be shown as his coffin floats with four angels seated on it, or being led bound on a dromedary.

Julian of Antioch (Latin: Julianus, Greek: Ίουλιανός; d. AD 305 x 311), variously distinguished as Julian the Martyr, Julian of Tarsus, Julian of Cilicia, and Julian of Anazarbus, was a 4th-century Christian martyr and saint. He is sometimes confused with the St Julian who was martyred with his wife Basilissa.

== Life ==
Of senatorial rank, he was killed during the persecutions of Diocletian.

According to legend, he was subjected to terrible tortures, and paraded daily for a whole year through various cities of Cilicia. He was then sewn into a sack half-filled with scorpions, sand, and vipers, then cast into the sea. The waters carried his body to Alexandria, and he was buried there before his relics were translated to Antioch.

== Veneration ==
Saint John Chrysostom preached a homily in Julian's honor at Antioch, whose chief basilica was said to be the final resting place for Julian's relics and was known in his honor.

His feast day is observed on June 21 in the Eastern Orthodox Church and on March 16 in the Catholic Church.

== See also ==
- Saint Julian of Antioch, patron saint archive
