= Leutfridus of Évreux =

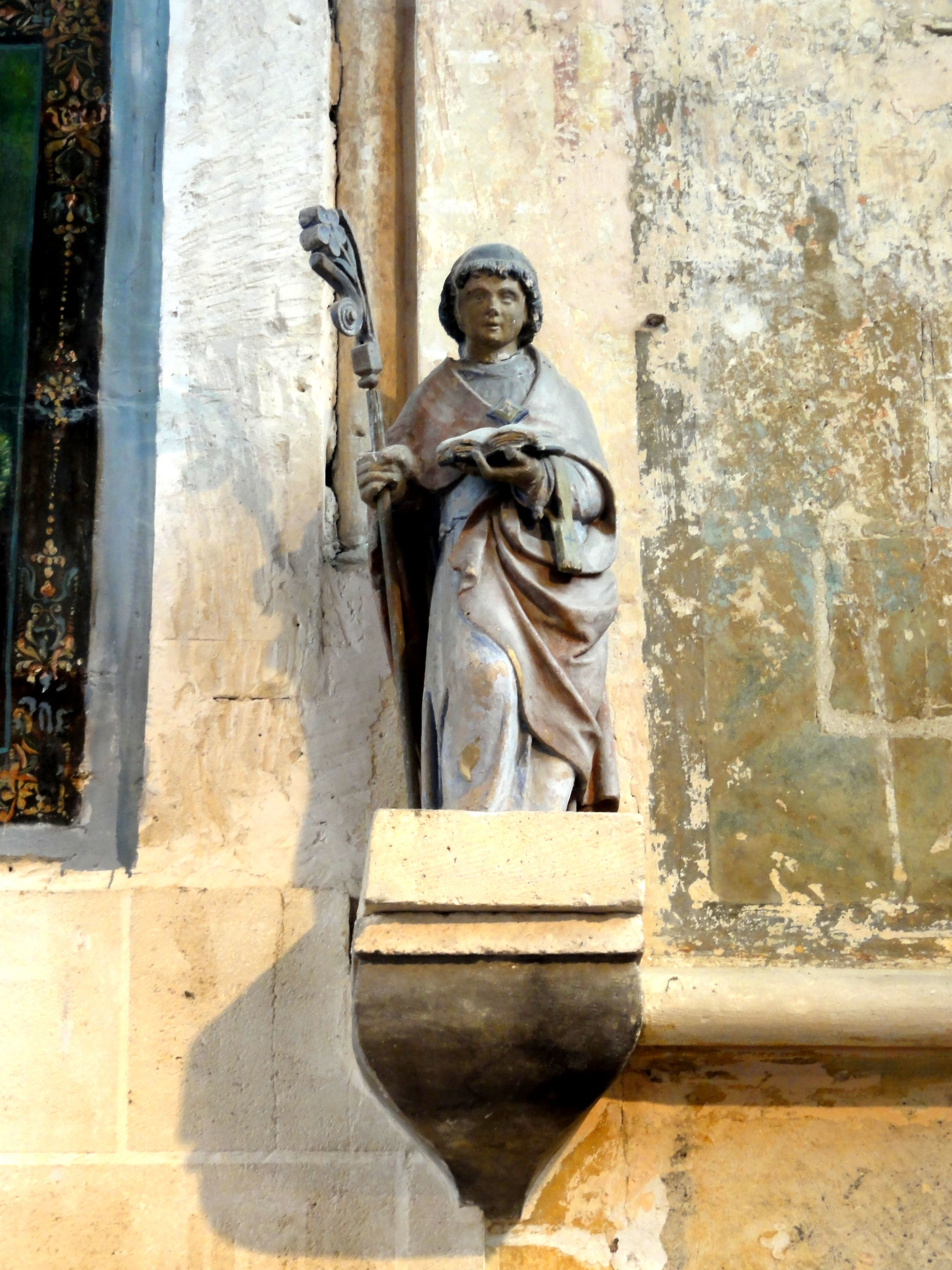
statue de saint Leufroy, église Saint-Leufroy,

Leutfridus (died 738) was a French monk and saint.

== Life ==
Leutfridus studied at Condat Abbey and at Chartres, and was for a time a teacher at Evreux. A Benedictine, he was also a spiritual student of Saint Sidonius of Saint-Saëns. He spent time as a hermit at Cailly and at Rouen. He founded the abbey of La Croix-Saint-Qu'en around 690, and served as its first abbot. The abbey was later renamed Saint-Leufroy in his honor.

Leutfridus died in 738; his feast day is June 21.

Leutfridus was the brother of Saint Agofredus.

== Butler's account ==
The hagiographer Alban Butler wrote,

St. Leufredus, In French Leufroi, Abbot

HE was a native of the territory of Evreux, and performed his studies partly in the monastery of St. Taurinus at Evreux. Hearing the great sanctity of B. Sidonius, abbot near Rouen, much spoken of, he repaired to him, and received the monastic habit at his hands. By the advice of St. Anshert, archbishop of Rouen, he returned to his own country, and on a spot two leagues from Evreux, upon the Eure, where St. Owen had formerly erected a cross and a chapel, he built a monastery in honour of the cross, which he called the cross of St. Owen, but it is long since called the cross of St. Leufroi. Fasting, watching, and prayer were the constant exercises of his whole life, especially during forty years that he governed his monastery. (Note: Note 1. This monastery of the Cross of St. Leufroi was anciently called by the old name of the village where it was built, Madric, in Latin Madriacense, and is possessed by old Benedictins.) He died happily after receiving the holy viaticum in 738, and was succeeded in the abbacy by his brother St. Agofroi. In the incursions of the Normans in the ninth century, the monks fled for refuge to the abbey of St. Germain-des-Prez at Paris, carrying with them the relics of St. Owen, St. Turiave, St. Leufroi and St. Agofroi. When they returned, they left in gratitude for their entertainment those of St. Leufroi and St. Turiave, which still remain in that great abbey. St. Leufroi is named in the Roman Martyrology on the 21st of June, and honoured with an office in the new Paris Breviary.

See his anonymous life written in the ninth age with the remarks of Mabillon, sæc. 3. Ben. part 1, p. 582; also Usuard, the life of St. Owen, &c.
