= Diocletianic Persecution =

Persecution of Christians in the Roman Empire (303–313)

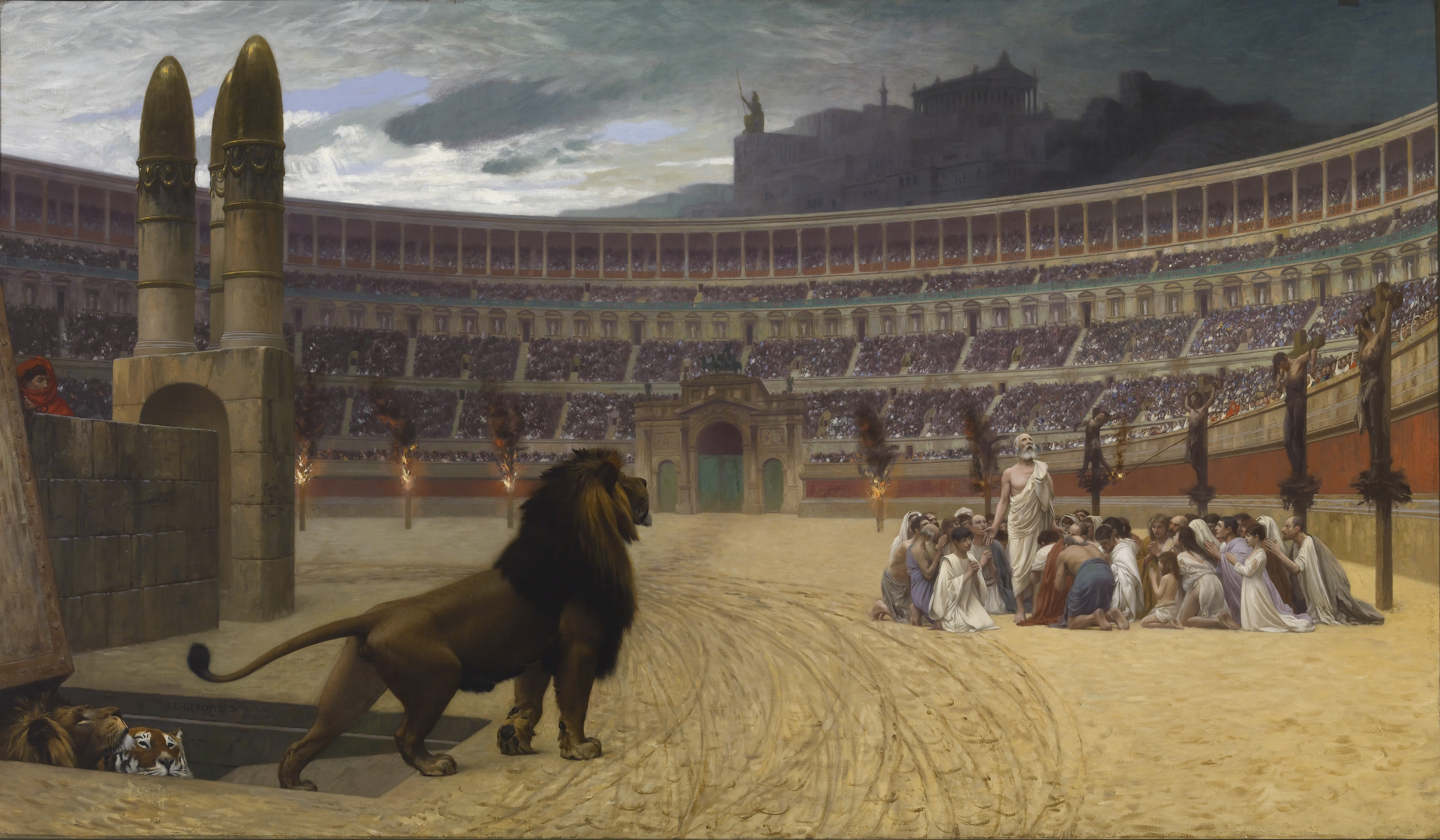
The Christian Martyrs' Last Prayer, by Jean-Léon Gérôme (1883)

The Diocletianic or Great Persecution was the last and most severe persecution of Christians in the Roman Empire. In 303, the emperors Diocletian, Maximian, Galerius, and Constantius issued a series of edicts rescinding Christians' legal rights and demanding that they comply with traditional religious practices. Later edicts targeted the clergy and demanded universal sacrifice, ordering all inhabitants to sacrifice to the Roman gods (Jews were exempt). The persecution varied in intensity across the empire—weakest in Gaul and Britain, where only the first edict was applied, and strongest in the Eastern provinces. Persecutory laws were nullified by different emperors (Galerius with the Edict of Serdica in 311) at different times. Traditionally, the reign of Constantine the Great (306–337 AD) and Licinius' Edict of Milan in 313 have marked the end of the persecution.

Christians had been subject to intermittent local discrimination in the empire. Roman Emperors before Diocletian were reluctant to legislate against Christianity. In the 250s, under the reigns of Decius and Valerian, Roman subjects including Christians were compelled to sacrifice to Roman gods or face imprisonment and execution, but there is no evidence that these edicts were specifically intended to attack Christianity. After Gallienus's accession in 260, these laws went into abeyance. Diocletian's assumption of power in 284 did not mark an immediate reversal of imperial inattention to Christianity, but it did herald a gradual shift in official attitudes toward religious minorities. In the first fifteen years of his rule, Diocletian purged the army of Christians, condemned Manicheans to death, and surrounded himself with public opponents of Christianity. Diocletian's preference for activist government, combined with his self-image as a restorer of past Roman glory, foreboded the most pervasive persecution in Roman history. In the winter of 302, Galerius urged Diocletian to begin a general persecution of the Christians. Diocletian was wary and asked the oracle at Didyma for guidance. The oracle's reply was read as an endorsement of Galerius's position, and a general persecution was called on 23 February 303.

Persecutory policies varied in intensity across the empire. Whereas Galerius and Diocletian were avid persecutors, Constantius was unenthusiastic. Later persecutory edicts, including the calls for universal sacrifice, were not applied in his domain. His son, Constantine, on taking the imperial office in 306, restored Christians to full legal equality and returned property that had been confiscated during the persecution. In Italy in 306, the usurper Maxentius ousted Maximian's successor Severus, promising full religious toleration. Galerius ended the persecution in the East in 311, but it was resumed in Egypt, Palestine, and Asia Minor by his successor, Maximinus. Constantine and Licinius, Severus's successor, signed the Edict of Milan in 313, which offered a more comprehensive acceptance of Christianity than Galerius's edict had provided. Licinius ousted Maximinus in 313, bringing an end to persecution in the East.

The persecution failed to check the rise of the Church. By 324, Constantine was sole ruler of the empire, and Christianity had become his favored religion. Although the persecution resulted in death, torture, imprisonment, or dislocation for many Christians, most of the empire's Christians avoided punishment. The persecution did, however, cause many churches to split between those who had complied with imperial authority (the traditores), and those who had remained "pure". Certain schisms, like those of the Donatists in North Africa and the Melitians in Egypt, persisted long after the persecutions. The Donatists would not be reconciled to the Church until after 411.

Some historians posit that in the centuries that followed the persecutory era, Christians created a "cult of the martyrs" and exaggerated the barbarity of the persecutions. Other historians using texts and archeological evidence from the period assert that this position is in error. Christian accounts were criticized during the Enlightenment and afterwards, most notably by Edward Gibbon. That can be attributed to the political anticlerical and secular tenor of that period. Modern historians, such as G. E. M. de Ste. Croix, have attempted to determine whether Christian sources exaggerated the scope of the Diocletianic persecution, but disagreements continue.

== Background ==
=== Prior persecutions ===
From its first appearance to its legalization under Constantine, Christianity was an illegal religion in the eyes of the Roman state. For the first two centuries of its existence, Christianity and its practitioners were unpopular with the people at large. Christians were always suspect, members of a "secret society" who communicated with a private code and shied away from the public sphere. It was popular hostility and the anger of the crowd that drove the earliest persecutions, not official action. Around 112, Pliny, the governor of Bithynia–Pontus, was sent long lists of denunciations of Christians by anonymous citizens, which Emperor Trajan advised him to ignore. In Lyon in 177, it was only the intervention of civil authorities that stopped a pagan mob from dragging Christians from their houses and beating them to death.

To the followers of the traditional cults, Christians were odd creatures: not quite Roman but not quite barbarian either. Their practices were deeply threatening to traditional mores. Christians rejected public festivals, refused to take part in the imperial cult, avoided public office, and publicly criticized ancient traditions. Conversions tore families apart: Justin Martyr tells of a pagan husband who denounced his Christian wife, and Tertullian tells of children disinherited for becoming Christians. Traditional Roman religion was inextricably interwoven into the fabric of Roman society and state, but Christians refused to observe its practices. (Note: Early pagan opponents of the Christians would see their God as a political criminal, executed under a governor of Judea for proclaiming himself "King of the Jews" and note that their holy texts included an allegorical attack on the Roman state that prophesied its imminent destruction (Revelation). Those arguments were less effective as time went on since Christians were visibly apolitical.) In the words of Tacitus, Christians showed "hatred of the human race" (odium generis humani). Among the more credulous, Christians were thought to use black magic in pursuit of revolutionary aims and to practise incest and cannibalism.

Nonetheless, for the first two centuries of the Christian era, no emperor issued general laws against the faith or its Church. The persecutions were carried out under the authority of local government officials. At Bithynia–Pontus in 111, it was Pliny; at Smyrna in 156 and Scilli near Carthage in 180, it was the proconsul; at Lyon in 177, it was the provincial governor. When Emperor Nero executed Christians for their alleged involvement in the fire of 64, it was a purely local affair and did not spread beyond the city limits of Rome. The early persecutions were certainly violent but they were sporadic, brief, and limited in extent. They were of limited threat to Christianity as a whole. The very capriciousness of official action, however, made the threat of state coercion loom large in the Christian imagination.

In the 3rd century, the pattern changed. Emperors became more active, and government officials began to actively pursue Christians rather than merely to respond to the will of the crowd. Christianity also changed. No longer were its practitioners merely "the lower orders fomenting discontent"; some Christians were now rich or from the upper classes. Origen, writing at about 248, tells of "the multitude of people coming in to the faith, even rich men and persons in positions of honour and ladies of high refinement and birth." Official reaction grew firmer. In 202, according to the Historia Augusta, a 4th-century history of dubious reliability, Septimius Severus (r. 193–211) issued a general rescript forbidding conversion to either Judaism or Christianity. Maximin (r. 235–238) targeted Christian leaders. (Note: Clarke argues that other evidence (Cyprian, Epistolae 75.10.1f; Origen Contra Celsus 3.15) undermines Eusebius's picture of Maximin's policy, and vouches for a comparatively light persecution instead.) Decius (r. 249–251), demanding a show of support for the old pagan Roman religion, proclaimed that all inhabitants of the empire must sacrifice to the gods, eat sacrificial meat, and testify to these acts. Christians were obstinate in their non-compliance. Church leaders, like Fabian, bishop of Rome, and Babylas, bishop of Antioch, were arrested, tried and executed, as were certain members of the Christian laity, like Pionius of Smyrna. (Note: Although some members of the laity were persecuted, the primary targets of official action were always the clergy and the more prominent lay Christians.) Origen was tortured during the persecution and died about a year after from the resulting injuries.

The Decian persecution was a grave blow to the Church. At Carthage, there was mass apostasy (renunciation of the faith). At Smyrna, the bishop Euctemon sacrificed and encouraged others to do the same. Because the Church was largely urban, it should have been easy to identify, isolate, and destroy the Church hierarchy. That did not happen. In June 251, Decius died in battle, which left his persecution incomplete. His persecutions were not followed up for another six years, which allowed some Church functions to resume. Valerian, Decius's friend, took up the imperial mantle in 253. Though he was at first thought of as "exceptionally friendly" towards the Christians, his actions soon showed otherwise. In July 257, he issued a persecutory edict. As punishment for following the Christian faith, Christians were to face exile or condemnation to the mines. In August 258, he issued a second edict, making the punishment death. This persecution stalled in June 260, when Valerian was captured in battle. His son Gallienus (r. 260–268), ended the persecution and inaugurated nearly 40 years of freedom from official sanctions, praised by Eusebius as the "little peace of the Church". The peace was undisturbed, save for occasional, isolated persecutions, until Diocletian became emperor.

=== Persecution and Tetrarchic ideology ===
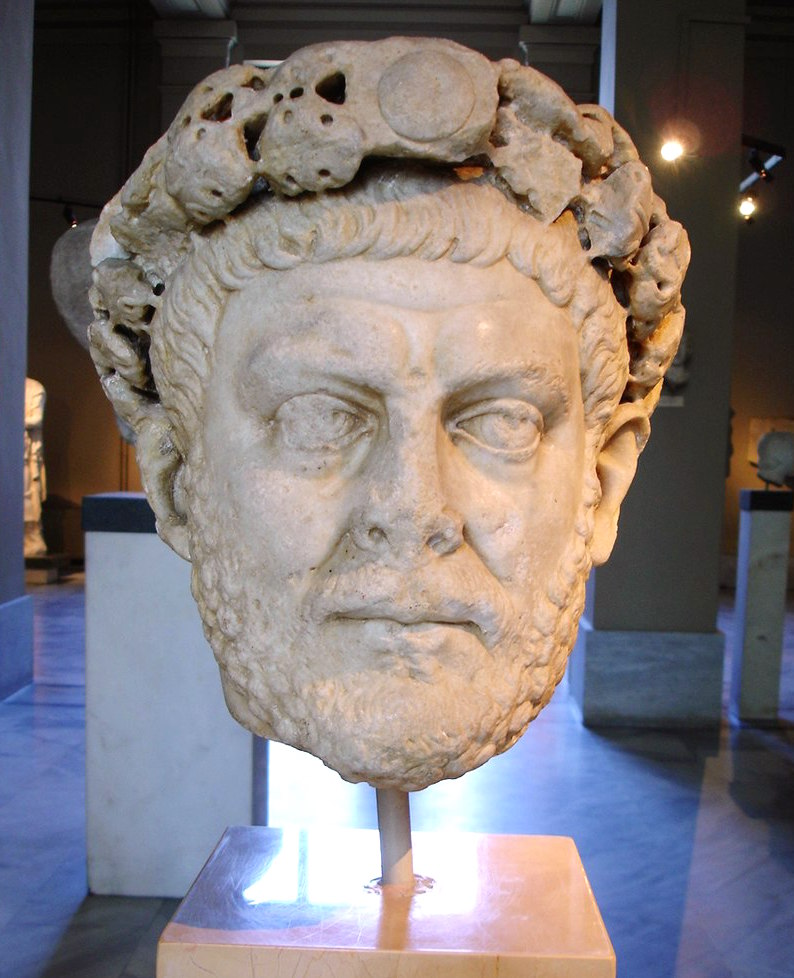
Head from a statue of Diocletian at the Istanbul Archaeological Museum

Diocletian, acclaimed emperor on 20 November 284, was a religious conservative who was faithful to the traditional Roman cult. Unlike Aurelian (r. 270–275), Diocletian did not foster any new cult of his own. He preferred the older Olympian gods. Nonetheless, Diocletian wished to inspire a general religious revival. As the panegyrist to Maximian declared: "You have heaped the gods with altars and statues, temples and offerings, which you dedicated with your own name and your own image, whose sanctity is increased by the example you set, of veneration for the gods. Surely, men will now understand what power resides in the gods, when you worship them so fervently." Diocletian associated himself with the head of the Roman pantheon, Jupiter; his co-emperor, Maximian, associated himself with Hercules. This connection between god and emperor helped to legitimize the emperors' claims to power and tied imperial government closer to the traditional cult.

Diocletian did not insist on exclusive worship of Jupiter and Hercules, which would have been a drastic change in the pagan tradition. For example, Elagabalus had tried fostering his own god and no others and had failed dramatically. Diocletian built temples for Isis and Sarapis at Rome and a temple to Sol in Italy. He, however, favored gods that provided for the safety of the whole empire, instead of the local deities of the provinces. In Africa, Diocletian's revival focused on Jupiter, Hercules, Mercury, Apollo, and the imperial cult. The cult of Saturn, the romanized Baal-hamon, was neglected. In imperial iconography Jupiter and Hercules were pervasive. The same pattern of favoritism affected Egypt as well. Native Egyptian deities saw no revival, nor was the sacred hieroglyphic script used. Unity in worship was central to Diocletian's religious policies.

Diocletian, like Augustus and Trajan before him, styled himself a "restorer". He urged the public to see his reign and his governing system, the Tetrarchy (rule by four emperors), as a renewal of traditional Roman values and, after the anarchic 3rd century, a return to the "Golden Age of Rome". As such, he reinforced the long-standing Roman preference for ancient customs and Imperial opposition to independent societies. The Diocletianic regime's activist stance, however, and Diocletian's belief in the power of central government to effect major change in morals and society made him unusual. Most earlier emperors tended to be quite cautious in their administrative policies and preferred to work within existing structures, rather than overhaul them. Diocletian, in contrast, was willing to reform every aspect of public life to satisfy his goals. Under his rule, coinage, taxation, architecture, law and history were all radically reconstructed to reflect his authoritarian and traditionalist ideology. The reformation of the empire's "moral fabric", with its elimination of religious minorities, was simply one step in that process.

The unique position of the Christians and the Jews of the empire became increasingly apparent. The Jews had earned imperial toleration on account of the great antiquity of their faith. They had been exempted from Decius's persecution and continued to enjoy freedom from persecution under Tetrarchic government. (Note: The Palestinian Talmud records that when Diocletian paid a visit to the region, he decreed that "sacrifices should be offered by all the people except the Jews".) Because their faith was new and unfamiliar and not typically identified with Judaism by this time, Christians had no such excuse. Moreover, Christians had been distancing themselves from their Jewish heritage for their entire history.

Persecution was not the only outlet of the Tetrarchy's moral fervor. In 295, either Diocletian or his caesar (subordinate emperor) Galerius issued an edict from Damascus forbidding incestuous marriages and affirming the supremacy of Roman law over local law. (Note: The edict illegalized sibling marriage, which had long been customary in the East.) Its preamble insisted that it was every emperor's duty to enforce the sacred precepts of Roman law, for "the immortal gods themselves will favour and be at peace with the Roman name...if we have seen to it that all subject to our rule entirely lead a pious, religious, peaceable and chaste life in every respect". The principles, if given their full extension, would logically require Roman emperors to enforce conformity in religion.

=== Public support ===
Christian communities grew quickly in many parts of the empire (and especially in the East) after 260, when Gallienus brought peace to the Church. The data to calculate figures are nearly non-existent, but the historian and sociologist Keith Hopkins has given crude and tentative estimates for the Christian population in the 3rd century. Hopkins estimates that the Christian community grew from a population of 1.1 million in 250 to a population of 6 million by 300, about 10% of the empire's total population. (Note: Hopkins assumes a constant growth rate of 3.35% per annum. Hopkins' study is cited at Potter, 314. The historian Robin Lane Fox gives a smaller estimate of the Christian population in 300—4% or 5% of the empire's total population—but allows that Christian numbers grew as a result of the hardship of the years from 250 to 280.) Christians even expanded into the countryside, where they had never been numerous before. Churches in the later 3rd century were no longer as inconspicuous as they had been in the 1st and 2nd centuries. Large churches were prominent in certain major cities throughout the empire. The church in Nicomedia even sat on a hill overlooking the imperial palace. These new churches probably represented not only absolute growth in Christian population, but also the increasing affluence of the Christian community. (Note: Clarke argues against reading a large advancement in either the numbers or the social status of Christians into this data.) In some areas where Christians were influential, such as North Africa and Egypt, traditional deities were losing credibility.

It is unknown how much support there was for persecution within the aristocracy. After Gallienus's peace, Christians reached high ranks in Roman government. Diocletian even appointed several Christians to those positions, and his wife and daughter may have been sympathetic to the Church. There were many individuals willing to be martyrs and many provincials willing to ignore any persecutory edicts from the emperors as well. Even Constantius was known to have disapproved of persecutory policies. The lower classes demonstrated little of the enthusiasm that they had shown for earlier persecutions. (Note: Clarke cautions, however, that this shift in attitudes may simply be an artifact of the source material.) They no longer believed the slanderous accusations that were popular in the 1st and 2nd centuries. Perhaps, as the historian Timothy Barnes has suggested, the long-established Church had become another accepted part of their lives.

Within the highest ranks of the imperial administration, however, there were men who were ideologically opposed to the toleration of Christians, like the philosopher Porphyry of Tyre and Sossianus Hierocles, governor of Bithynia. To E.R. Dodds, the works of these men demonstrated "the alliance of pagan intellectuals with the Establishment". Hierocles thought Christian beliefs absurd. If Christians applied their principles consistently, he argued, they would pray to Apollonius of Tyana instead of Jesus. Hierocles considered that Apollonius's miracles had been far more impressive and Apollonius never had the temerity to call himself "God". He thought the scriptures were full of "lies and contradictions" and Peter and Paul had peddled falsehoods. In the early 4th century, an unidentified philosopher published a pamphlet attacking the Christians. This philosopher, who might have been a pupil of the Neoplatonist Iamblichus, dined repeatedly at the imperial court. Diocletian was surrounded by an anti-Christian clique. (Note: Aurelius Victor describes the circle around Diocletian as an imminentium scrutator; Lactantius describes it as a scrutator rerum futurarum.)

Porphyry was somewhat restrained in his criticism of Christianity, at least in his early works, On the Return of the Soul and Philosophy from Oracles. He had few complaints about Jesus, whom he praised as a saintly individual, a "humble" man. Christ's followers, however, he damned as "arrogant". Around 290, Porphyry wrote a fifteen-volume work entitled Against the Christians. (Note: Later dates are possible, but discouraged by the statement in the Suda (written in the 10th century) that Porphyry only "survived until [the reign] of Diocletian".) In the work, Porphyry expressed his shock at the rapid expansion of Christianity. He also revised his earlier opinions of Jesus, questioning Jesus' exclusion of the rich from the Kingdom of Heaven, and his permissiveness in regards to the demons residing in pigs' bodies. Like Hierocles, he unfavorably compared Jesus to Apollonius of Tyana. Porphyry held that Christians blasphemed by worshiping a human being rather than the Supreme God and behaved treasonably in forsaking the traditional Roman cult. "To what sort of penalties might we not justly subject people," Porphyry asked, "who are fugitives from their fathers' customs?"

Pagan priests, too, were interested in suppressing any threat to traditional religion. They believed their ceremonies to be hindered by the presence of Christians, who were thought to cloud the sight of oracles and stall the gods' recognition of their sacrifices. The Christian Arnobius, writing during Diocletian's reign, attributes financial concerns to provisioners of pagan services:

The augurs, the dream interpreters, the soothsayers, the prophets, and the priestlings, ever vain...fearing that their own arts be brought to nought, and that they may extort but scanty contributions from the devotees, now few and infrequent, cry aloud, 'The gods are neglected, and in the temples there is now a very thin attendance. Former ceremonies are exposed to derision, and the time-honoured rites of institutions once sacred have sunk before the superstitions of new religions.'

== Early persecutions ==
=== Christians in the army ===
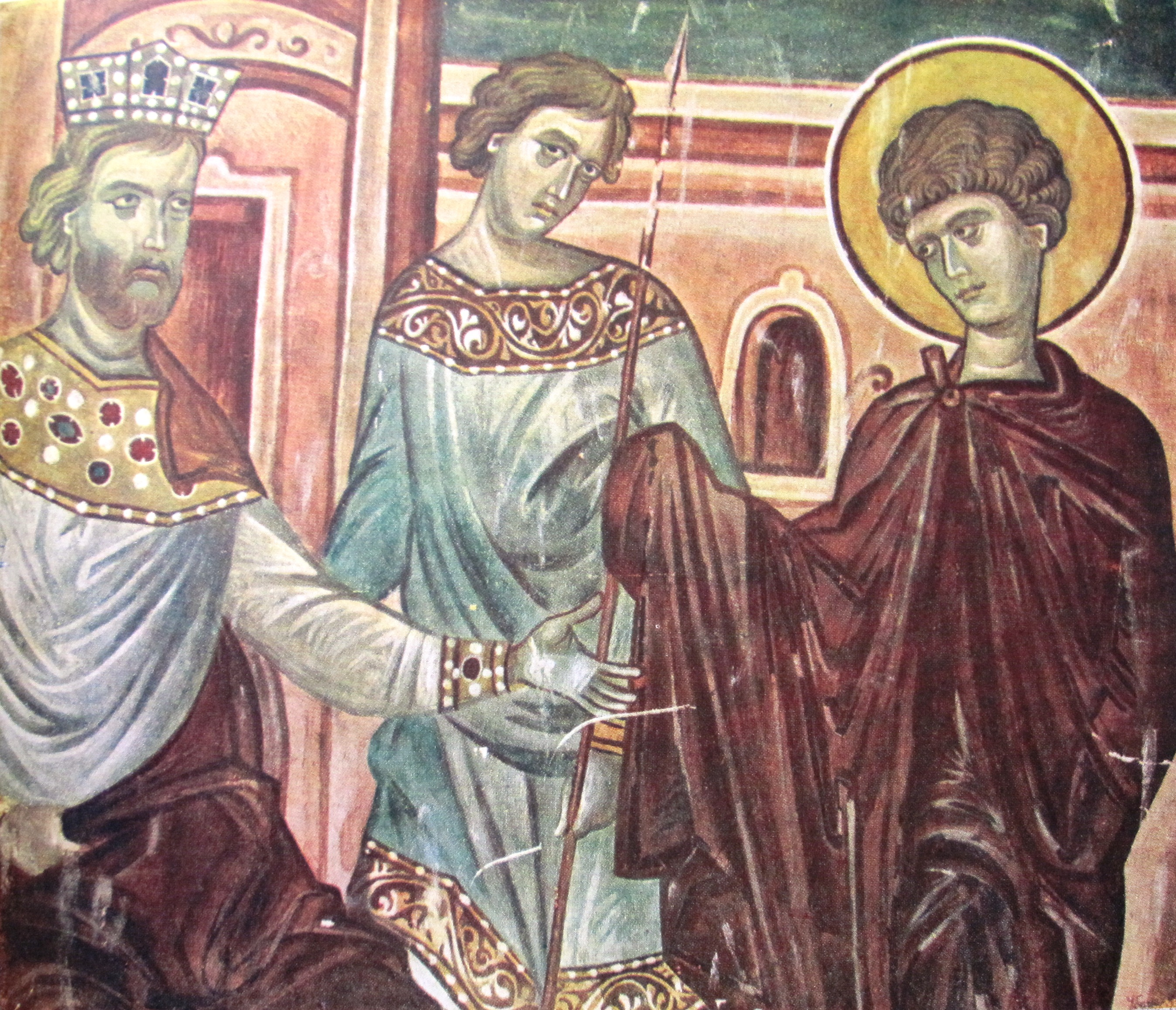
Saint George before Diocletian. A 14th-century mural from Ubisi, Georgia. Christian tradition places the martyrdom of St. George, formerly a Roman army officer, in the reign of Diocletian.

At the conclusion of the Persian Wars in 299, the co-emperors Diocletian and Galerius traveled from Persia to Syrian Antioch (Antakya). The Christian rhetor Lactantius records that at Antioch some time in 299, the emperors were engaged in sacrifice and divination in an attempt to predict the future. The haruspices, diviners of omens from sacrificed animals, were unable to read the sacrificed animals and failed to do so after repeated trials. The master haruspex eventually declared that this failure was the result of interruptions in the process caused by profane men. Certain Christians in the imperial household had been observed making the sign of the cross during the ceremonies and were alleged to have disrupted the haruspices' divination. Diocletian, enraged by the turn of events, declared that all members of the court had to make a sacrifice. Diocletian and Galerius also sent letters to the military command that demanding that the entire army perform the sacrifices or face discharge. (Note: Helgeland places the event in 301. Barnes argued for a date of 302 or "not long before" in 1976, but accepted a date of 299 in 1981. Woods argues for a date of 297, on the grounds that Diocletian and Galerius were both in the area at this time, and because Eusebius's Chronicle associates the persecution with Galerius's defeat by Narseh. (For, although Eusebius dates the defeat to 302, it actually occurred in 297.)) Since there are no reports of bloodshed in Lactantius's narrative, Christians in the imperial household must have survived the event. Eusebius of Caesarea, a contemporary ecclesiastical historian, tells a similar story: commanders were told to give their troops the choice of sacrifice or loss of rank. The terms were strong since a soldier would lose his career in the military, his state pension and his personal savings, but they were not fatal. According to Eusebius, the purge was broadly successful, but Eusebius is confused about the technicalities of the event, and his characterization of the overall size of the apostasy is ambiguous. Eusebius also attributes the initiative for the purge to Galerius, rather than Diocletian.

The modern scholar Peter Davies surmises that Eusebius is referring to the same event as Lactantius but that he heard of the event through public rumors and knew nothing of the privileged discussion at the emperor's private religion ceremony that Lactantius had access to. Since it was Galerius's army that would have been purged (Diocletian had left his in Egypt to quell continuing unrest), Antiochenes would understandably have believed Galerius to be its instigator. The historian David Woods argues instead that Eusebius and Lactantius are referring to different events. Eusebius, according to Woods, describes the beginnings of the army purge in Palestine, while Lactantius describes events at court. Woods asserts that the relevant passage in Eusebius's Chronicon was corrupted in the translation to Latin and that Eusebius's text originally located the beginnings of the army persecution at a fort in Betthorus (El-Lejjun, Jordan).

Eusebius, Lactantius, and Constantine each allege that Galerius was the prime impetus for the military purge, and its prime beneficiary. (Note: Davies disputes Barnes' identification of Constantine's unnamed emperor (Oratio ad Coetum Sanctum 22) with Galerius.) Diocletian, for all his religious conservatism, still had tendencies towards religious tolerance. (Note: Barnes argues that Diocletian was prepared to tolerate Christianity—he did, after all, live within sight of Nicomedia's Christian church, and his wife and daughter were, if not Christians themselves (as per Eusebius, Historia Ecclesiastica 8.1.3; Lactantius, De Mortibus Persecutorum 15.1), at least sympathetic to the faith—but was successively brought closer and closer to intolerance under Galerius's influence. Davies takes a more skeptical view of the same evidence.) Galerius, by contrast, was a devoted and passionate pagan. According to Christian sources, he was consistently the main advocate of such persecution. He was also eager to exploit his position to his own political advantage. As the lowest-ranking emperor, Galerius was always listed last in imperial documents. Until the end of the Persian War in 299, he had not even had a major palace. Lactantius states that Galerius hungered for a higher position in the imperial hierarchy. Galerius's mother, Romula, was bitterly anti-Christian; she had been a pagan priestess in Dacia, and loathed the Christians for avoiding her festivals. Newly prestigious and influential after his victories in the Persian War, Galerius might have wished to compensate for a previous humiliation at Antioch, when Diocletian had forced him to walk at the front of the imperial caravan, rather than inside it. His resentment fed his discontent with official policies of tolerance; from 302 on, he probably urged Diocletian to enact a general law against the Christians. Since Diocletian was already surrounded by an anti-Christian clique of counsellors, these suggestions must have carried great force.

=== Manichean persecution ===
Affairs quieted after the initial persecution. Diocletian remained in Antioch for the following three years. He visited Egypt once, over the winter of 301–302, where he began the grain dole in Alexandria. In Egypt, some Manicheans, followers of the prophet Mani, were denounced in the presence of the proconsul of Africa. On 31 March 302, in an official edict called the De Maleficiis et Manichaeis compiled in the Collatio Legum Mosaicarum et Romanarum and addressed to the proconsul of Africa, Diocletian wrote:

We have heard that the Manichaens […] have set up new and hitherto unheard-of sects in opposition to the older creeds so that they might cast out the doctrines vouchsafed to us in the past by the divine favour for the benefit of their own depraved doctrine. They have sprung forth very recently like new and unexpected monstrosities among the race of the Persians—a nation still hostile to us—and have made their way into our empire, where they are committing many outrages, disturbing the tranquility of our people and even inflicting grave damage to the civic communities. We have cause to fear that with the passage of time they will endeavour, as usually happens, to infect the modest and tranquil of an innocent nature with the damnable customs and perverse laws of the Persians as with the poison of a malignant (serpent) … We order that the authors and leaders of these sects be subjected to severe punishment, and, together with their abominable writings, burnt in the flames. We direct their followers, if they continue recalcitrant, shall suffer capital punishment, and their goods be forfeited to the imperial treasury. And if those who have gone over to that hitherto unheard-of, scandalous and wholly infamous creed, or to that of the Persians, are persons who hold public office, or are of any rank or of superior social status, you will see to it that their estates are confiscated and the offenders sent to the (quarry) at Phaeno or the mines at Proconnesus. And in order that this plague of iniquity shall be completely extirpated from this our most happy age, let your devotion hasten to carry out our orders and commands.

The Christians of the empire were vulnerable to the same line of thinking.

=== Diocletian and Galerius, 302–303 ===
Diocletian was in Antioch in the autumn of 302, when the next instance of persecution occurred. The deacon Romanus visited a court while preliminary sacrifices were taking place and interrupted the ceremonies, denouncing the act in a loud voice. He was arrested and sentenced to be set aflame, but after rain extinguished the fires, Diocletian overruled the decision and decided that Romanus should have his tongue removed instead. Romanus was executed on 18 November 303. The boldness of this Christian displeased Diocletian, and he left the city and made for Nicomedia to spend the winter, accompanied by Galerius.

Throughout those years, the moral and religious didacticism of the emperors was reaching a fevered pitch; at the behest of an oracle, it was to hit its peak. According to Lactantius, Diocletian and Galerius entered into an argument over what imperial policy towards Christians should be while at Nicomedia in 302. Diocletian argued that forbidding Christians from the bureaucracy and military would be sufficient to appease the gods, and Galerius pushed for their extermination. The two men sought to resolve their dispute by sending a messenger to consult the oracle of Apollo at Didyma. Porphyry may also have been present at this meeting. Upon returning, the messenger told the court that "the just on earth" hindered Apollo's ability to speak. These "just", Diocletian was informed by members of the court, could only refer to the Christians of the empire. At the behest of his court, Diocletian acceded to demands for a universal persecution.

== Great Persecution ==
=== First edict ===
On 23 February 303, Diocletian ordered for the newly-built Christian church at Nicomedia to be razed, its scriptures burned, and its treasures seized. 23 February was the feast of the Terminalia, for Terminus, the god of boundaries. It was the day they would terminate Christianity. The next day, Diocletian's first "Edict against the Christians" was published. (Note: The edict might not actually have been an "edict" in the technical sense; Eusebius does not refer to it as such, and the passage in the Passio Felicis which includes the word edictum ("exiit edictum imperatorum et Caesarum super omnem faciem terrae") may simply have been written to echo Luke 2:1 ("exiit edictum a Caesare Augusto ut profiteretur universus orbis terrae"). Elsewhere in the passion, the text is called a programma. The text of the edict itself does not actually survive.) The key targets of this piece of legislation were senior Christian clerics and Christians' property, just as they had been during Valerian's persecution. The edict prohibited Christians from assembling for worship and ordered the destruction of their scriptures, liturgical books, and places of worship across the empire. (Note: This apparently included any house in which scriptures were found.) But Christians tried to retain the scriptures as far as possible, but according to de Ste Croix, "it appears that giving them up... was not regarded as a sin" in the East; sufficient numbers of them must have been successfully saved, as is evident from the representative findings of "early biblical papyri" in the stream of the transmission of the text during this period. Christians might have given up apocryphal or pseudepigraphal works, or even refused to surrender their scriptures at the cost of their own lives, and there were some cases where the scriptures were not in the end destroyed. Christians were also deprived of the right to petition the courts, making them potential subjects for judicial torture; Christians could not respond to actions brought against them in court; Christian senators, equestrians, decurions, veterans, and soldiers were deprived of their ranks; and Christian imperial freedmen were re-enslaved.

Diocletian requested that the edict be pursued "without bloodshed", against Galerius's demands that all those refusing to sacrifice be burned alive. In spite of Diocletian's request, local judges often enforced executions during the persecution, as capital punishment was among their discretionary powers. Galerius's recommendation—burning alive—became a common method of executing Christians in the East. After the edict was posted in Nicomedia, a man named Eutius tore it down and ripped it up, shouting "Here are your Gothic and Sarmatian triumphs!" He was arrested for treason, tortured, and burned alive soon after, becoming the edict's first martyr. (Note: Gaddis writes that the quotation may be a slur on Galerius's trans-Danubian ancestry.) The provisions of the edict were known and enforced in Palestine by March or April (just before Easter), and it was in use by local officials in North Africa by May or June. The earliest martyr at Caesarea was executed on 7 June, and the edict was in force at Cirta from 19 May. In Gaul and Britain Constantius did not enforce this edict, but in the East progressively harsher legislation was devised; the edict was firmly enforced in Maximian's domain until his abdication in 305, but persecutions later began to wane when Constantius succeeded Maximian and were officially halted when Maxentius took power in 306.

=== Second, third, and fourth edicts ===
In the summer of 303, following a series of rebellions in Melitene (Malatya, Turkey) and Syria, a second edict was published, ordering the arrest and imprisonment of all bishops and priests. In the judgment of the historian Roger Rees, there was no logical necessity for the second edict, and the fact that Diocletian issued one indicates that he either was unaware that the first edict was being carried out or felt that it was not working as quickly as he wanted. Following the publication of the second edict, prisons began to fill since the underdeveloped prison system of the time could not handle the deacons, lectors, priests, bishops, and exorcists forced upon it. Eusebius writes that the edict netted so many priests that ordinary criminals were crowded out and had to be released.

In anticipation of the upcoming twentieth anniversary of his reign, on 20 November 303, Diocletian declared a general amnesty in a third edict. Any imprisoned clergyman could be freed so long as he agreed to make a sacrifice to the gods. Diocletian may have been searching for some good publicity with that legislation. He may also have sought to fracture the Christian community by publicising the fact that its clergy had apostatized. The demand to sacrifice was unacceptable to many of the imprisoned, but wardens often managed to obtain at least nominal compliance. Some of the clergy sacrificed willingly; others did so on pain of torture. Wardens were eager to be rid of the clergy in their midst. Eusebius, in his Martyrs of Palestine, records the case of one man who, after being brought to an altar, had his hands seized and made to complete a sacrificial offering. The clergyman was told that his act of sacrifice had been recognized and was summarily dismissed. Others were told they had sacrificed even when they had done nothing.

In 304, the fourth edict ordered all persons, men, women, and children to gather in a public space and offer a collective sacrifice. If they refused, they were to be executed. The precise date of the edict is unknown, but it was probably issued in either January or February 304 and was being applied in the Balkans in March. The edict was in use in Thessalonica in April 304 and in Palestine soon after. The last edict was not enforced at all in the domains of Constantius and was applied in the domains of Maximian until his abdication in 305. In the East, it remained applicable until the issue of the Edict of Milan by Constantine and Licinius in 313.

=== Abdications, instability, and renewed toleration, 305–311 ===
Diocletian and Maximian resigned on May 1, 305. Constantius and Galerius became augusti (senior emperors), while two new emperors, Severus and Maximinus, became caesars (junior emperors). According to Lactantius, Galerius had forced Diocletian's hand in the matter and secured the appointment of loyal friends to the imperial office. In this "Second Tetrarchy", it seems that only the Eastern emperors, Galerius and Maximinus, continued with the persecution. As they left office, Diocletian and Maximian probably imagined Christianity to be in its last throes. Churches had been destroyed, the Church leadership and hierarchy had been snapped, and the army and civil service had been purged. Eusebius declares that apostates from the faith were "countless" (μυρίοι) in number. At first, the new Tetrarchy seemed even more vigorous than the first. Maximinus in particular was eager to persecute. In 306 and 309, he published his own edicts demanding universal sacrifice. Eusebius accuses Galerius of pressing on with the persecution as well.

In the West, however, what remained after the Diocletianic settlement had weakened the Tetrarchy as a system of government. Constantine, the son of Constantius, and Maxentius, the son of Maximian, had been overlooked in the Diocletianic succession, which offended the parents and angered the sons. Constantine, against Galerius's will, succeeded his father on July 25, 306. He immediately ended any ongoing persecutions and offered Christians full restitution of what they had lost under the persecution. That declaration gave Constantine the opportunity to portray himself as a possible liberator of oppressed Christians everywhere. Maxentius, meanwhile, had seized power in Rome on 28 October 306, and soon brought toleration to all Christians within his realm. Galerius made two attempts to unseat Maxentius but failed both times. During the first campaign against Maxentius, Severus was captured, imprisoned, and executed.

=== The Peace of Galerius and the Edict of Milan, 311–313 ===
In the East, the persecution was officially discontinued on 30 April 311, although martyrdoms in Gaza continued until 4 May. The Edict of Serdica, also called Edict of Toleration by Galerius, was issued in 311 in Serdica (Sofia, Bulgaria) Galerius, officially ending the Diocletianic persecution of Christianity in the East. Galerius issued the proclamation to end hostilities while on his deathbed, which gave Christians the rights to exist freely under the law and to peaceable assembly. Persecution was everywhere at an end. Lactantius preserves the Latin text of the pronouncement and describes it as an edict. Eusebius provides a Greek translation of the pronouncement. His version includes imperial titles and an address to provincials, which suggests that the proclamation is, in fact, an imperial letter. The document seems to have been promulgated only in Galerius's provinces.

Among all the other arrangements that we are always making for the benefit and utility of the state, we have heretofore wished to repair all things in accordance with the laws and public discipline of the Romans, and to ensure that even the Christians, who abandoned the practice of their ancestors, should return to good sense. Indeed, for some reason or other, such self-indulgence assailed and idiocy possessed those Christians, that they did not follow the practices of the ancients, which their own ancestors had, perhaps, instituted, but according to their own will and as it pleased them, they made laws for themselves that they observed, and gathered various peoples in diverse areas. Then when our order was issued stating that they should return themselves to the practices of the ancients, many were subjected to peril, and many were even killed. Many more persevered in their way of life, and we saw that they neither offered proper worship and cult to the gods, or to the god of the Christians. Considering the observation of our own mild clemency and eternal custom, by which we are accustomed to grant clemency to all people, we have decided to extend our most speedy indulgence to these people as well, so that Christians may once more establish their own meeting places, so long as they do not act in a disorderly way. We are about to send another letter to our officials detailing the conditions they ought to observe. Consequently, in accord with our indulgence, they ought to pray to their god for our health and the safety of the state, so that the state may be kept safe on all sides, and they may be able to live safely and securely in their own homes.

Galerius's words reinforce the Tetrarchy's theological basis for the persecution; the acts did nothing more than attempt to enforce traditional civic and religious practices even if the edicts were thoroughly nontraditional. Galerius does nothing to violate the spirit of the persecution—Christians are still admonished for their nonconformity and foolish practices—Galerius never admits that he did anything wrong. Certain early 20th-century historians have declared that Galerius's edict definitively nullified the old "legal formula" non licet esse Christianos, made Christianity a religio licita, "on a par with Judaism", and secured Christians' property, among other things.

Not all have been so enthusiastic. The 17th-century ecclesiastical historian Tillemont called the edict "insignificant"; likewise, the late-20th-century historian Timothy Barnes cautions that the "novelty or importance of [Galerius'] measure should not be overestimated". Barnes notes that Galerius's legislation only brought to the East rights Christians already possessed in Italy and Africa. In Gaul, Spain, and Britain, moreover, Christians already had far more than Galerius was offering to Eastern Christians. Other late 20th-century historians, like Graeme Clark and David S. Potter, assert that for all its hedging, Galerius's issuance of the edict was a landmark event in the histories of Christianity and the Roman Empire.

Galerius's law was not effective for long in Maximinus's district. Within seven months of Galerius's proclamation, Maximinus resumed the persecution, which continued until 313, shortly before his death. At a meeting between Licinius and Constantine in Milan in February 313, the two emperors drafted the terms of a universal peace. The terms of this peace were posted by the victorious Licinius at Nicomedia on 13 June 313. Later ages have taken to calling the document the "Edict of Milan". (Note: The document is not actually an edict, but a letter. The two can be distinguished by the presence of a specific addressee on a letter, and the absence of one on an edict. The version of the document preserved by Lactantius (De Mortibus Persecutorum 48.2–12) is a letter to the governor of Bithynia, and was presumably posted in Nicomedia after Licinius had taken the city from Maximinus. Eusebius's version (Historia Ecclesiastica 10.5.2–14) is probably a copy sent to the governor of Palestine and posted in Caesarea.)

We thought it fit to commend these things most fully to your care that you may know that we have given to those Christians free and unrestricted opportunity of religious worship. When you see that this has been granted to them by us, your Worship will know that we have also conceded to other religions the right of open and free observance of their worship for the sake of the peace of our times, that each one may have the free opportunity to worship as he pleases; this regulation is made that we may not seem to detract from any dignity or any religion.

== Regional variation ==
Known martyrdoms in the East (Dubious)
| | Asia Minor | Oriens | Danube |
|---|---|---|---|
| Diocletian's provinces (303–305) | 26 | 31 | |
| Galerius's provinces (303–305) | | | 14 |
| Galerius's provinces (undatable) | | | 8 |
| Galerius's provinces (305–311) | 12 | | 12 |
After Davies, pp. 68–69. (Note: These figures count only the total number of martyrdoms, not the number of individuals martyred. Davies takes his figures from martyrs' acts collected by the Bollandists.)

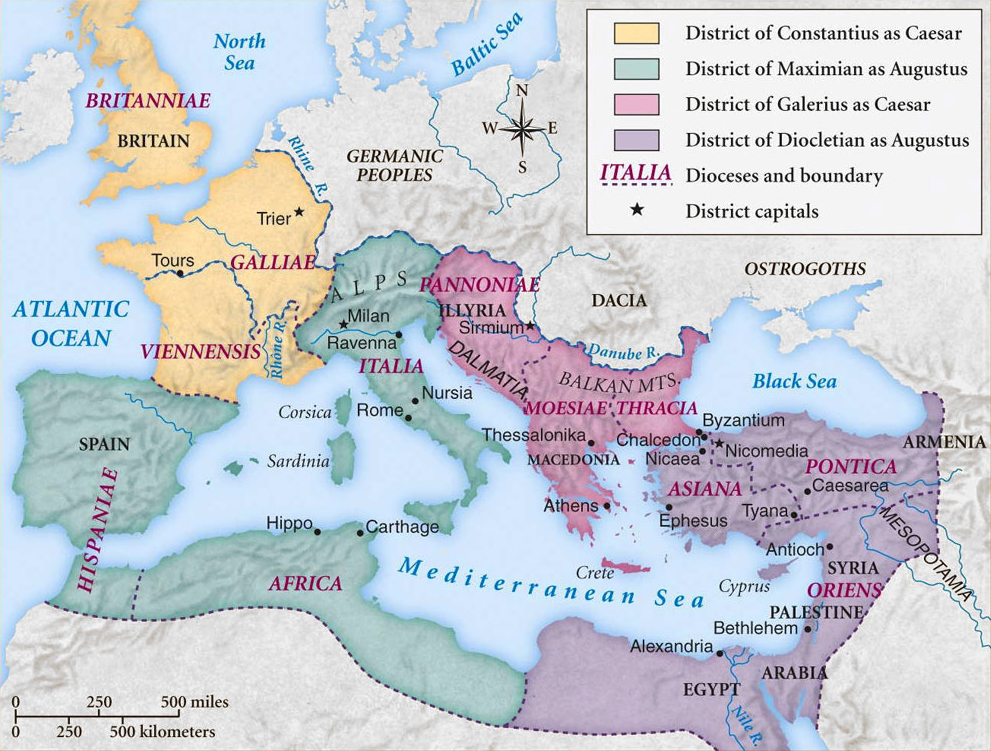
Map of the Roman Empire under the Tetrarchy, showing the dioceses and the four Tetrarchs' zones of influence.

The enforcement of the persecutory edicts was inconsistent. Since the Tetrarchs were more or less sovereign in their own realms, they had a good deal of control over persecutory policy. In Constantius's realm (Britain and Gaul), the persecution was only lightly enforced; in Maximian's realm (Italy, Spain, and Africa), it was firmly enforced; and in the East, under Diocletian (Asia Minor, Syria, Palestine and Egypt) and Galerius (Greece and the Balkans), its provisions were pursued with more fervor than anywhere else. For the Eastern provinces, Peter Davies tabulated the total number of martyrdoms for an article in the Journal of Theological Studies. Davies argues that the figures, although reliant on collections of acta that are incomplete and only partially reliable, point to a heavier persecution under Diocletian than under Galerius. The historian Simon Corcoran, in a passage on the origins of the early persecution edicts, criticizes Davies' over-reliance on these "dubious martyr acts" and dismisses his conclusions.

=== Britain and Gaul ===
The sources are inconsistent regarding the extent of the persecution in Constantius's domain, though all portray it as quite limited. Lactantius states that the destruction of church buildings was the worst thing that came to pass. Eusebius explicitly denies that any churches were destroyed in both his Ecclesiastical History and his Life of Constantine, but lists Gaul as an area suffering from the effects of the persecution in his Martyrs of Palestine. A group of bishops declared that "Gaul was immune" (immunis est Gallia) from the persecutions under Constantius. The death of Saint Alban, the first British Christian martyr, was once dated to this era, but most now assign it to the reign of Septimius Severus. The second, third and fourth edicts seem not to have been enforced in the West at all. It is possible that Constantius's relatively tolerant policies were the result of Tetrarchic jealousies; the persecution, after all, had been the project of the Eastern emperors, not the Western ones. After Constantine succeeded his father in 306, he urged the recovery of Church property lost in the persecution and legislated full freedom for all Christians in his domain.

=== Africa ===
While the persecution under Constantius was relatively light, there is no doubt about the force of the persecution in Maximian's domain. Its effects are recorded at Rome, Sicily, Spain, and in Africa—indeed, Maximian encouraged particularly strict enforcement of the edict in Africa. Africa's political elite were insistent that the persecution be fulfilled, and Africa's Christians, especially in Numidia, were equally insistent on resisting them. For the Numidians, to hand over scriptures was an act of terrible apostasy. Africa had long been home to the Church of the Martyrs—in Africa, martyrs held more religious authority than the clergy—and harbored a particularly intransigent, fanatical, and legalistic variety of Christianity. It was Africa that gave the West most of its martyrdoms.

Africa had produced martyrs even in the years immediately prior to the Great Persecution. In 298, Maximilian, a soldier in Tebessa, had been tried for refusing to follow military discipline; in Mauretania in 298, the soldier Marcellus refused his army bonus and took off his uniform in public. Once persecutions began, public authorities were eager to assert their authority. Anullinus, proconsul of Africa, expanded on the edict by deciding that in addition to the destruction of the Christians' scriptures and churches, the government should compel Christians to sacrifice to the gods. Governor Valerius Florus enforced the same policy in Numidia during the summer or autumn of 303, when he called for "days of incense burning"; Christians would sacrifice or they would lose their lives. In addition to those already listed, African martyrs also include Saturninus and the Martyrs of Abitinae, another group martyred on February 12, 304 in Carthage, and the martyrs of Milevis (Mila, Algeria).

The persecution in Africa encouraged the development of Donatism, a schismatic movement that forbade any compromise with Roman government or traditor bishops (those who had handed scriptures over to secular authorities). One of the key moments in the break with the mainline Church occurred in Carthage in 304. The Christians from Abitinae had been brought to the city and imprisoned. Friends and relatives of the prisoners came to visit but encountered resistance from a local mob. The group was harassed, beaten, and whipped; the food they had brought for their imprisoned friends was scattered on the ground. The mob had been sent by Mensurius, the bishop of the city, and Caecilian, his deacon, for reasons that remain obscure. In 311, Caecilian was elected bishop of Carthage. His opponents charged that his traditio made him unworthy of the office and declared itself for another candidate, Majorinus. Many others in Africa, including the Abitinians, also supported Majorinus against Caecilian. Majorinus's successor Donatus would give the dissident movement its name. By the time Constantine took over the province, the African Church was deeply divided. The Donatists would not be reconciled to the Catholic Church until after 411.

=== Italy and Spain ===
Maximian probably seized the Christian property in Rome quite easily since Roman cemeteries were noticeable, and Christian meeting places could have been easily found out. Senior churchmen would have been similarly prominent. The Bishop of Rome, Marcellinus, died in 304, during the persecution, but how he died is disputed among historians: Eusebius wrote in his Historia Ecclesiastica that Marcellinus was "brought away by the persecution", an obscure phrase that may refer to his martyrdom or to the fact that he fled the city. Others assert that Marcellinus was a traditor. Marcellinus appears in the 4th-century Church's depositio episcoporum but not its feriale, or calendar of feasts, where all Marcellinus's predecessors from Fabian had been listed—a "glaring" absence, in the opinion of historian John Curran. Within forty years, Donatists began spreading rumors that Marcellinus had been a traditor and that he had even sacrificed to the pagan gods. The tale was embroidered in the 5th-century forgery the "Council of Sinuessa", and the vita Marcelli of the Liber Pontificalis. The latter work states that the bishop had indeed apostatised but redeemed himself through martyrdom a few days afterward.

What followed Marcellinus's act of traditio, if it ever actually happened, is unclear. There appears to have been a break in the episcopal succession since his successor, Marcellus I, was not consecrated until either November or December 308; it was likely not possible to elect a new bishop during the persecution. In the meantime, two factions diverged in the Roman Church, separating the lapsed (Christians who had complied with the edicts to ensure their own safety) and the rigorists (those who would not compromise with secular authority). These two groups clashed in street fights and riots, eventually leading to murders. It is said that Marcellus, a rigorist, purged all mention of Marcellinus from church records and removed his name from the official list of bishops. Marcellus was banished from the city and died in exile on 16 January 309.

The persecution was firmly enforced until Maximian's abdication in 305 but started to wane when Constantius (who seemed not to have been enthusiast about it) succeeded as august. After Constantius's death, Maxentius took advantage of Galerius's unpopularity in Italy (Galerius had introduced taxation for the city and countryside of Rome for the first time in the history of the empire) to declare himself emperor. On 28 October 306, Maxentius convinced the Praetorian Guard to support him, mutiny, and invest him with the purple robes of the emperor. Maxentius did not permit religious freedom for Christians in the realm or the restitution of confiscated property. The Great Persecution continued until 311, when Constantine arrived at Rome's gates and defeated Maxentius with an army only the size. Maxentius was such a tyrant that the Romans would not open the gates for his defeated retreating army but opened them only for the conqueror Constantine.

On 18 April 308, Maxentius allowed the Christians to hold another election for the city's bishop, which Eusebius won. Eusebius was a moderate, however, in a still-divided Church. Heraclius, the head of the rigorist faction, opposed readmission of the lapsed. Rioting followed, and Maxentius exiled the combative pair from the city, leaving Eusebius to die in Sicily on 21 October. The office was vacant for almost three years, until Maxentius permitted another election. Miltiades was elected on 2 July 311, as Maxentius prepared to face Constantine in battle. Miltiades sent two deacons with letters from Maxentius to the prefect of Rome, the head of the city, responsible for publishing imperial edicts within the city, to ensure compliance. African Christians were still recovering lost property as late as 312.

Outside Rome, there are fewer sure details of the progress and effects of the persecution in Italy, and the number of deaths is unclear. The Acta Eulpi records the martyrdom of Euplus of Catania, a Christian who dared to carry the holy Gospels around, refusing to surrender them. Euplus was arrested on April 29, 304, tried, and martyred on August 12. According to the Martyrologium Hieronymianus, the bishop of Aquileia Chrysogonus was executed during this period, and Maximus of Turin and Venatius Fortunatus mention the martyrdom of Cantius, Cantianus and Cantianilla in Aquileia as well. In Spain the bishop Ossius of Corduba narrowly escaped martyrdom. Constantine confronted and defeated Maxentius at the Battle of the Milvian Bridge outside Rome on 28 October 312; Maxentius retreated to the Tiber river and drowned. Constantine entered the city the next day but declined to take part in the traditional ascent up the Capitoline Hill to the Temple of Jupiter. Constantine's army had advanced on Rome under a Christian sign. It had become, officially at least, a Christian army. Constantine's apparent conversion was visible elsewhere, too. Bishops dined at Constantine's table, and many Christian building projects began soon after his victory. On 9 November 312, the old headquarters of the Imperial Horse Guard were razed to make way for the Lateran Basilica. Under Constantine's rule, Christianity became the prime focus of official patronage.

=== Nicomedia ===
Before the end of February 303, a fire destroyed part of the imperial palace at Nicomedia. Galerius convinced Diocletian that the culprits were Christian conspirators who had plotted with palace eunuchs. An investigation into the act was commissioned, but no responsible party was found. Executions followed. The palace eunuchs Dorotheus and Gorgonius were eliminated. One individual named Peter was stripped, raised high, and scourged. Salt and vinegar were poured in his wounds, and he was slowly boiled over an open flame. The executions continued until at least 24 April 303, when six individuals, including Bishop Anthimus, were decapitated. The persecution intensified; presbyters and other clergymen could be arrested without having even been accused of a crime and condemned to death. A second fire appeared sixteen days after the first. Galerius left the city, declaring it unsafe, and Diocletian soon followed. Lactantius blames Galerius's allies for setting the fire; Constantine, in a later reminiscence, attributes the fire to "lightning from heaven".

Lactantius, still living in Nicomedia, saw the beginnings of the apocalypse in Diocletian's persecution. Lactantius's writings during the persecution exhibit both bitterness and Christian triumphalism. His eschatology runs directly counter to Tetrarchic claims to "renewal". Diocletian asserted that he had instituted a new era of security and peace; Lactantius saw the beginning of a cosmic revolution.

=== Palestine and Syria ===
==== Before Galerius's edict of toleration ====
Recorded martyrdoms in Palestine (dubious)
| Date | Martyrdoms |
|---|---|
| 303–305 | 13 |
| 306–310 | 34 |
| 310–311 | 44 |
Palestinian martyrdoms recorded in the Martyrs of Palestine. After Clarke, 657–58.

Palestine is the only region for which an extended local perspective of the persecution exists, in the form of Eusebius's Martyrs of Palestine. Eusebius was resident in Caesarea, the capital of Roman Palestine, for the duration of the persecution, although he also traveled to Phoenicia and Egypt, and perhaps Arabia as well. Eusebius's account is imperfect. It focuses on martyrs that were his personal friends before the persecutions began and includes martyrdoms that took place outside of Palestine. His coverage is uneven. He provides only bare generalities at the bloody end of the persecutions, for example. Eusebius recognizes some of his faults. At the outset of his account of the general persecution in the Ecclesiastical History, Eusebius laments the incompleteness of his reportage: "how could one number the multitude of martyrs in each province, and especially those in Africa and Mauretania, and in Thebaid and Egypt?"

Since no one below the status of governor held the legal power to enforce capital punishment, most recalcitrant Christians would have been sent to Caesarea to await punishment. The first martyr, Procopius, was sent to Caesarea from Scythopolis (Beit She'an, Israel), where he had been a reader and an exorcist. He was brought before the governor on 7 June 303, and asked to sacrifice to the gods and to pour a libation for the emperors. Procopius responded by quoting Homer: "the lordship of many is not a good thing; let there be one ruler, one king". The governor beheaded the man at once.

Further martyrdoms followed in the months thereafter and increased in the next spring, when the new governor, Urbanus, published the fourth edict. Eusebius probably does not list a complete account of all those executed under the fourth edict—he alludes in passing to others imprisoned with Thecla of Gaza, for example, though he does not name them.

The bulk of Eusebius's account deals with Maximinus, who took up the office of emperor in Nicomedia on 1 May 305, and immediately thereafter left the city for Caesarea, hurrying, Lactantius alleges, so as to oppress and trample the diocese of Oriens. Initially, Maximinus governed only Egypt and the Levant. He issued his own persecutory edict in the spring of 306, ordering general sacrifice. The edict of 304 had been difficult to enforce, since the imperial government had no record of city-dwelling subjects who held no agricultural land. Galerius solved this problem in 306 by running another census. This contained the names of all urban heads of household and the number of their dependents (past censuses had listed only persons paying tax on land, such as landowners and tenants). Using lists drawn up by the civil service, Maximinus ordered his heralds to call all men, women, and children down to the temples. There, after tribunes called everyone by name, everyone sacrificed.

At some point after the publication of Maximinus's first edict, perhaps in 307, Maximinus changed the penalty for transgressions. Instead of receiving the death penalty, Christians would now be mutilated and condemned to labor in state-owned mines. Since Egyptian mines were overstaffed, mostly by the influx of Christian prisoners, Egyptian penitents were increasingly sent to the copper mines at Phaeno in Palestine and Cilicia in Asia Minor. At Diocaesarea (Sepphoris, Israel) in the spring of 308, 97 Christian confessors were received by Firmilianus from the porphyry mines in the Thebaid. Firmilianus cut the tendons on their left feet, blinded their right eyes, and sent them to the mines of Palestine. (Note: S. Lieberman located this event at Lydda (Lod, Israel). Barnes contests that identification by arguing that since Eusebius specifically identifies the city as wholly Jewish, it is unlikely to have been Lydda, which had a Christian bishop by 325. Diocaesarea, however, was noted for its Jewishness long thereafter.) On another occasion, 130 others received the same punishment. Some were sent to Phaeno, and some to Cilicia.

Eusebius characterizes Urbanus as a man who enjoyed some variety in his punishments. One day, shortly after Easter 307, he ordered the virgin Theodosia from Tyre (Ṣūr, Lebanon) thrown to the sea for conversing with Christians attending trial and refusing sacrifice; the Christians in court, meanwhile, he sent to Phaeno. On a single day, 2 November 307, Urbanus sentenced a man named Domninus to be burned alive, three youths to fight as gladiators, and a priest to be exposed to a beast. On the same day, he ordered some young men to be castrated, sent three virgins to brothels, and imprisoned a number of others, including Pamphilus of Caesarea, a priest, scholar, and defender of the theologian Origen. Soon after, and for unknown reasons, Urbanus was stripped of his rank, imprisoned, tried, and executed, all in one day of expedited proceedings. His replacement, Firmilianus, was a veteran soldier and one of Maximinus's trusted confidants.

Eusebius notes that the event marked the beginning of a temporary respite from persecution. Although the precise dating of this respite is not specifically noted by Eusebius, the text of the Martyrs records no Palestinian martyrs between 25 July 308 and 13 November 309. The political climate probably impinged on persecutory policy here: it was the period of the conference of Carnuntum, which met in November 308. Maximinus probably spent the next few months in discussion with Galerius over his role in the imperial government and did not have the time to deal with the Christians.

In the autumn of 309, Maximinus resumed persecution by issuing letters to provincial governors and his praetorian prefect, the highest authority in judicial proceedings after the emperor, demanding that Christians conform to pagan customs. His new legislation called for another general sacrifice, coupled with a general offering of libations. It was even more systematic than the first, allowing no exceptions for infants or servants. Logistai (curatores), strategoi, duumviri, and tabularii, who kept the records, saw to it that there were no evasions. Maximinus introduced some innovations to the process, making him the only known persecuting emperor to have done so. Thd edict now required food sold in the marketplaces to be covered in libation. Maximinus sent sentries to stand guard at bathhouses and city gates to ensure that all customers sacrificed. He issued copies of the fictitious Acts of Pilate to encourage popular hatred of Christ. Prostitutes confessed, under judicial torture, to having engaged in debaucheries with Christians. Bishops were reassigned to work as stable boys for the Imperial horse guard or keepers of the Imperial camels. Maximinus also worked for a revival of pagan religion. He appointed high priests for each province, men who were to wear white robes and supervise daily worship of the gods. Maximinus demanded that vigorous restoration work be done on decaying temples within his domain.

The next few months saw the worst extremes of the persecution. On 13 December 309, Firmilianus condemned some Egyptians arrested at Ascalon (Ashkelon, Israel) on their way to visit the confessors in Cilicia. Three were beheaded; the rest lost their left feet and right eyes. On 10 January 310, Peter and Bishop Asclepius from the dualist Christian sect Marcionism, both from Anaia, (near Eleutheropolis, Israel), were burned alive. On 16 February Pamphilus and his six companions were executed. In the aftermath, four more members of Pamphilus's household were martyred for their displays of sympathy for the condemned. The last martyrs before Galerius's edict of toleration were executed on 5 and 7 March. Then the executions stopped. Eusebius does not explain this sudden halt, but it coincides with the replacement of Firmilianus with Valentinianus, a man appointed at some time before Galerius's death. The replacement is only attested to via epigraphic remains, like stone inscriptions; Eusebius does not mention Valentinianus anywhere in his writings.

==== After Galerius's edict of toleration ====
After Galerius's death, Maximinus seized Asia Minor. Even after Galerius's edict of toleration in 311, Maximinus continued to persecute. His name is absent from the list of emperors publishing Galerius's edict of toleration, perhaps through later suppression. Eusebius states that Maximinus complied with its provisions only reluctantly. Maximinus told his praetorian prefect Sabinus to write to provincial governors, requesting that they and their subordinates ignore "that letter" (Galerius's edict). Christians were to be free from molestation, and their mere Christianity would not leave them open to criminal charges. Unlike Galerius's edict, however, Maximinus's letter made no provisions for Christian assembly and not suggest that Christians build more churches.

Maximinus issued orders in Autumn 311 forbidding Christians to congregate in cemeteries. After issuing these orders, he was approached by embassies from cities within his domain, demanding he begin a general persecution. Lactantius and Eusebius state that these petitions were not voluntary, but had been made at Maximinus's behest. Maximinus began persecuting Church leaders before the end of 311. Peter of Alexandria was beheaded on 26 November 311. Lucian of Antioch was executed in Nicomedia on 7 January 312. According to Eusebius, many Egyptian bishops suffered the same fate. According to Lactantius, Maximinus ordered confessors to have "their eyes gouged out, their hands cut off, their feet amputated, their noses or ears severed". Antioch asked Maximinus if it could forbid Christians from living in the city. In response, Maximinus issued a rescript encouraging every city to expel its Christians. This rescript was published in Sardis on April 6, 312, and in Tyre by May or June. There are three surviving copies of Maximinus's rescript, in Tyre, Arycanda (Aykiriçay, Turkey), and Colbasa. They are all essentially identical. To address a complaint from Lycia and Pamphylia about the "detestable pursuits of the atheists [Christians]", Maximinus promised the provincials whatever they wanted—perhaps an exemption from the poll tax.

When Maximinus received notice that Constantine had succeeded in his campaign against Maxentius, he issued a new letter restoring Christians their former liberties. The text of this letter, which is preserved in Eusebius's Historia Ecclesiastica, however, suggests that the initiative was Maximinus's alone, and not that of Constantine or Licinius. It is also the only passage in the ancient sources providing Maximinus's rationale for his actions without the hostility of Lactantius and Eusebius. Maximinus states that he supported Diocletian and Galerius's early legislation but, upon being made Caesar, came to realize the drain such policies would have on his labor force, and began to employ persuasion without coercion. He goes on to assert that he resisted petitions from Nicomedians to forbid Christians from their city (an event that Eusebius does not otherwise record) and that when he accepted the demands of deputations from other cities, he was only following imperial custom. Maximinus concludes his letter by referencing the letter he wrote after Galerius's edict, asking that his subordinates be lenient. He does not refer to his early letters, which encouraged avid persecution.

In the early spring of 313, as Licinius advanced against Maximinus, the latter resorted to savagery in his dealings with his own citizens, and his Christians in particular. In May 313, Maximinus issued one more edict of toleration, hoping to persuade Licinius to stop advancing, and win more public support. For the first time, Maximinus issued a law which offered comprehensive toleration and the means to effectively secure it. As in his earlier letter, Maximinus is apologetic but one-sided. Maximinus absolves himself for all the failings of his policy, locating fault with local judges and enforcers instead. He frames the new universal toleration as a means of removing all ambiguity and extortion. Maximinus then declares full freedom of religious practice, encourages Christians to rebuild their churches, and pledges to restore Christian property lost in the persecution. The edict changed little: Licinius defeated Maximinus at the Battle of Tzirallum on 30 April 313; the now-powerless Maximinus committed suicide at Tarsus in the summer of 313. On 13 June, Licinius published the Edict of Milan in Nicomedia.

=== Egypt ===
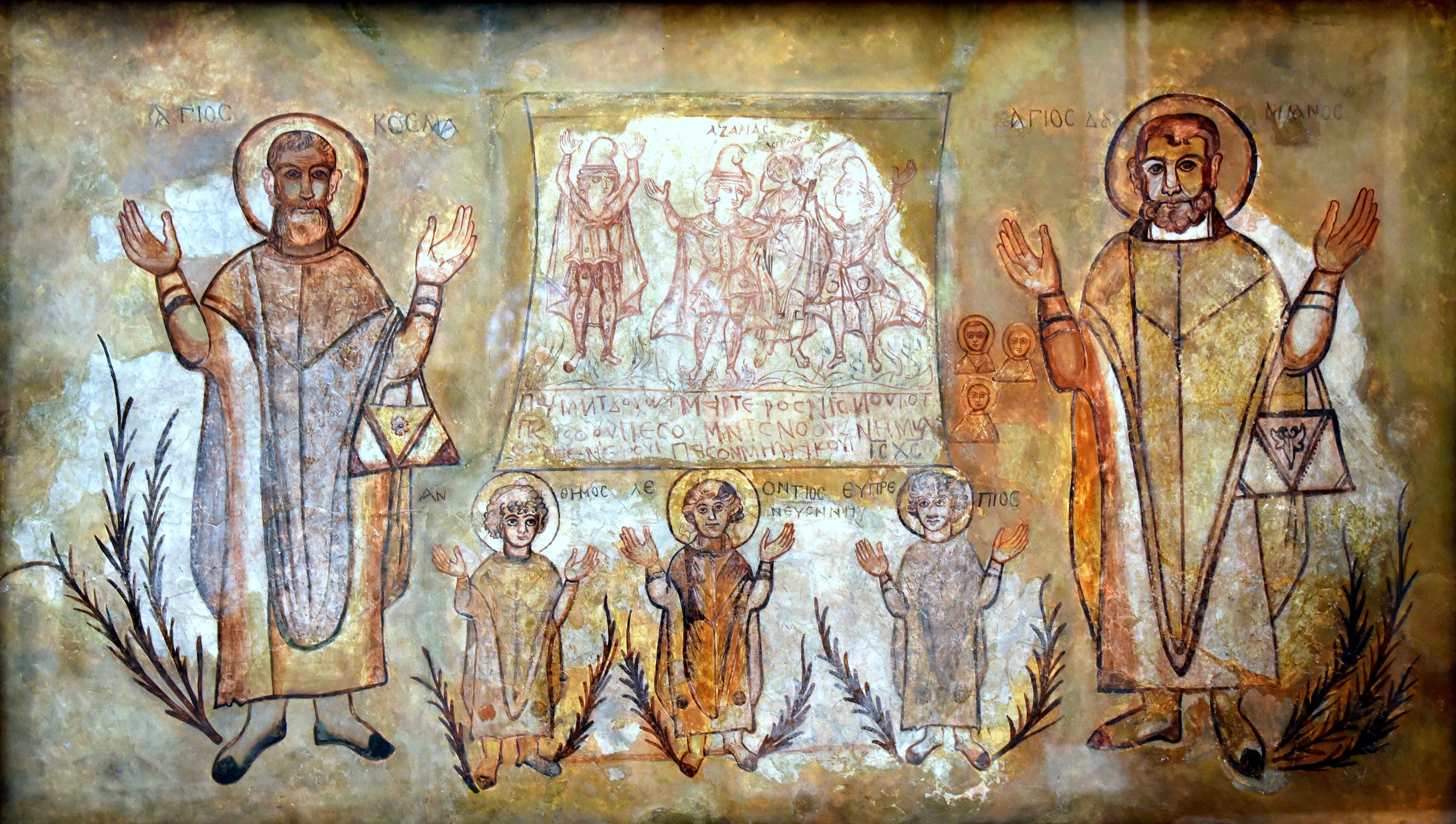
Wall painting of martyred saints, Ananias, Azarias, and Misael from the town of Samalut with Saints Damian and Cosmas; martyred during the persecutions of Diocletian in the late 3rd century AD. Stucco. 6th century AD. From Wadi Sarga, Egypt. British Museum

In Eusebius' Martyrs of Palestine, Egypt is covered only in passing. When Eusebius remarks on the region, however, he writes of tens, twenties, even hundreds of Christians put to death on a single day, which would seem to make Egypt the region that suffered the most during the persecutions. According to one report that Barnes calls "plausible, if unverifiable", 660 Christians were killed in Alexandria alone between 303 and 311. In Egypt, Peter of Alexandria fled his namesake city early on in the persecution, leaving the Church leaderless. Meletius, the bishop of Lycopolis (Asyut), took up the job in his place. Meletius performed ordinations without Peter's permission, which caused some bishops to complain to Peter.

Meletius soon refused to treat Peter as any kind of authority, and expanded his operations into Alexandria. According to Epiphanius of Salamis, the Church split into two sections: the "Catholic Church", under Peter, and, after Peter's execution, Alexander; and the "Church of the Martyrs" under Meletius. When the two groups found themselves imprisoned together in Alexandria during the persecution, Peter of Alexandria drew up a curtain in the middle of their cell. He then said: "There are some who are of my view, let them come over on my side, and those of Melitius's view, stay with Melitius." Thus divided, the two sects went on with their affairs, purposely ignoring each other's existence. The schism continued to grow throughout the persecution, even with its leaders in jail, and would persist long after the deaths of both Peter and Meletius. Fifty-one bishoprics are attested for Egypt in 325; fifteen are only known otherwise as seats of the schismatic Church.

== Legacy ==
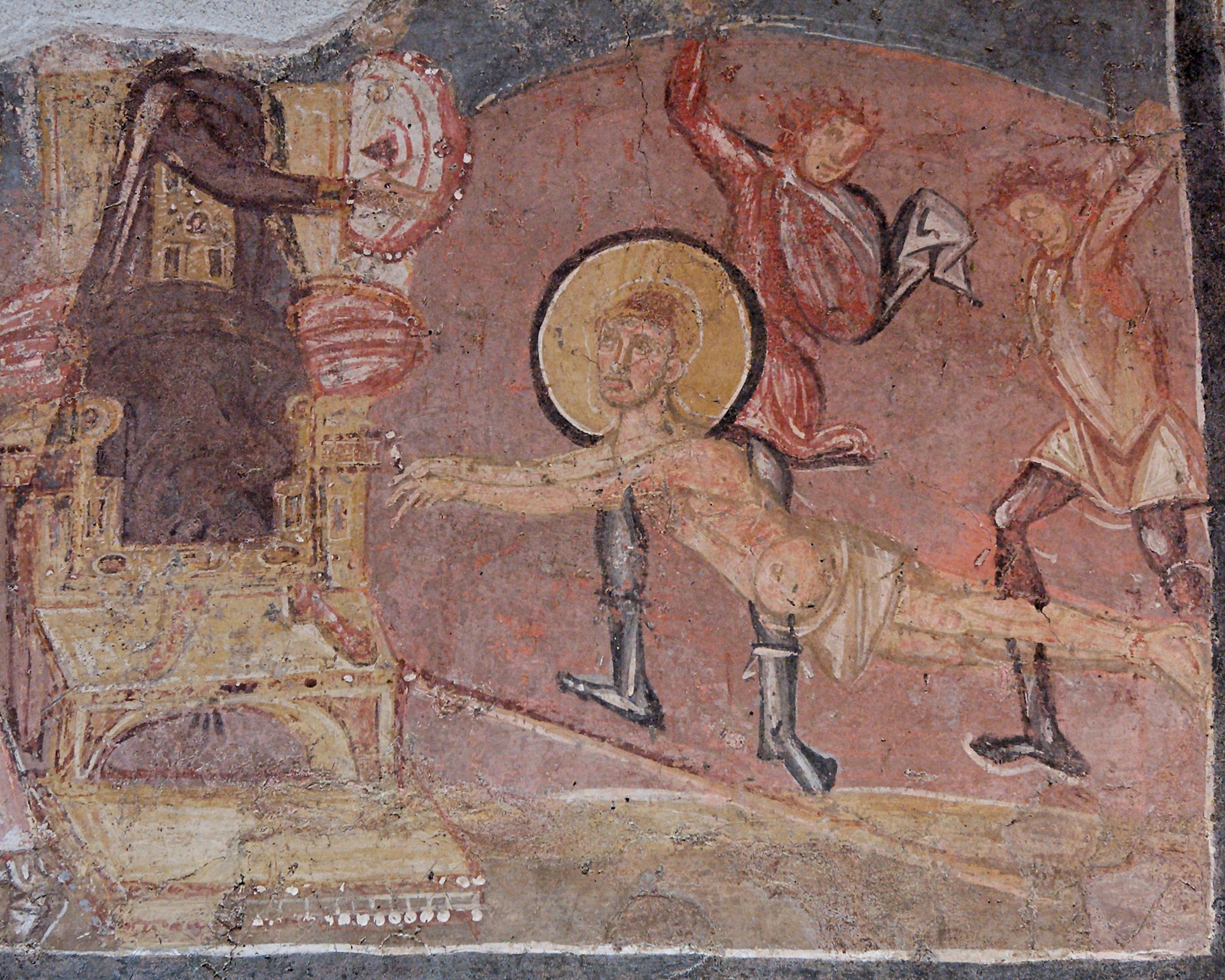
St. Erasmus flogged in the presence of Emperor Diocletian. Byzantine artwork, from the crypt of the church of Santa Maria in Via Lata in Rome.

The Diocletianic persecution was ultimately unsuccessful. As Robin Lane Fox has put it, it was simply "too little and too late". Christians were never purged systematically in any part of the empire, and Christian evasion continually undermined the edicts' enforcement. Some bribed their way to freedom. The Christian Copres escaped on a technicality: to avoid sacrificing in court, he gave his brother power of attorney and had him do it instead. Many simply fled. Eusebius, in his Vita Constantini, wrote that "once more the fields and woods received the worshippers of God". To contemporary theologians, there was no sin in that behavior. Lactantius held that Christ himself had encouraged it, and Bishop Peter of Alexandria quoted Matthew 10:23 ("when they persecute you in this city, flee ye into another") in support of the tactic.

The pagan crowd was more sympathetic to the Christians' sufferings than they had been in the past. Lactantius, Eusebius and Constantine write of revulsion at the excesses of the persecutors—Constantine of executioners "wearied out, and disgusted at the cruelties" they had committed. The fortitude of the martyrs in the face of death had earned the faith respectability in the past, though it may have won few converts. The thought of martyrdom, however, sustained Christians under trial and in prison, hardening their faith. Packaged with the promise of eternal life, martyrdom proved attractive for the growing segment of the pagan population which was, to quote Dodds, "in love with death". To use Tertullian's famous phrase, the blood of the martyrs was the seed of the Church.

By 324, Constantine, the Christian convert, ruled the entire empire alone. Christianity became the greatest beneficiary of imperial largesse. The persecutors had been routed. As the historian J. Liebeschuetz wrote "The final result of the Great Persecution provided a testimonial to the truth of Christianity which it could have won in no other way." After Constantine, the Christianization of the Roman empire continued apace. Under Theodosius I (r. 378–95), Christianity became the state religion. By the 5th century, Christianity was the empire's predominant faith, and filled the same role paganism had at the end of the 3rd century. Because of the persecution, however, a number of Christian communities were riven between those who had complied with imperial authorities (traditores) and those who had refused. In Africa, the Donatists, who protested the election of the alleged traditor Caecilian to the bishopric of Carthage, continued to resist the authority of the central Church until after 411. The Melitians in Egypt left the Egyptian Church similarly divided.

In future generations, both Christians and pagans would look back on Diocletian as, in the words of theologian Henry Chadwick, "the embodiment of irrational ferocity". To medieval Christians, Diocletian was the most loathsome of all Roman emperors. From the 4th century on, Christians would describe the great persecution of Diocletian's reign as a bloodbath. The Liber Pontificalis, a collection of biographies of the popes, alleges 17,000 martyrs within a single thirty-day period. In the 4th century, Christians created a "cult of martyrs" in homage to the fallen.

== Controversies ==
The 20th-century historian G.E.M. de Ste Croix argues that hagiographers portrayed a persecution far more extensive than the real one had been, and the Christians responsible for this cult were loose with the facts. Their "heroic age" of martyrs, or "Era of Martyrs", was held to begin with Diocletian's accession to the emperorship in 284, rather than 303, when persecutions actually began; Barnes argues that they fabricated a large number of martyrs' tales (indeed, most surviving martyrs' tales are forgeries), exaggerated the facts in others, and embroidered true accounts with miraculous details. According to Curran, of the surviving martyrs' acts, only those of Agnes, Sebastian, Felix and Adauctus, and Marcellinus and Peter are even remotely historical. The traditional accounts were first questioned in the Enlightenment, when Henry Dodwell, Voltaire, and most famously Edward Gibbon questioned traditional accounts of the Christian martyrs.

In the final chapter of the first volume of his History of the Decline and Fall of the Roman Empire (1776), Gibbon claims that Christians had greatly exaggerated the scale of the persecutions they suffered:

After the church had triumphed over all her enemies, the interest as well as vanity of the captives prompted them to magnify the merit of their respective sufferings. A convenient distance of time or place gave an ample scope to the progress of fiction; and the frequent instances which might be alleged of holy martyrs, whose wounds had been instantly healed, whose strength had been renewed, and whose lost members had miraculously been restored, were extremely convenient for the purpose of removing every difficulty, and of silencing every objection. The most extravagant legends, as they conduced to the honour of the church, were applauded by the credulous multitude, countenanced by the power of the clergy, and attested by the suspicious evidence of ecclesiastical history.

Throughout his history, Gibbon implies that the early Church undermined traditional Roman virtues and thereby impaired the health of civil society. When Gibbon sought to reduce the numbers of the martyrs in his History, he was perceived as intending to diminish the Church and deny sacred history and was attacked for his suspected irreligion in print. The contemporary classical scholar Richard Porson mocked Gibbon, writing that his humanity never slept, "unless when women are ravished, or the Christians persecuted".

Some later historians, however, took Gibbon's emphases even further. As Croix put it in 1954, "The so-called Great Persecution has been exaggerated in the Christian tradition to an extent which even Gibbon did not fully appreciate." In 1972, the ecclesiastical Protestant historian Hermann Dörries was embarrassed to admit to his colleagues that his sympathies lay with the Christians rather than their persecutors. The Anglican historian W.H.C. Frend estimated that 3,000–3,500 Christians were killed in the persecution, although this number is disputed. The historian Min Seok Shin estimates that over 23,500 Christians suffered martyrdom under Diocletian, of whom the names of 850 are known.

Although the number of verifiably true martyrs' tales has decreased, and estimates of the total casualty rate have been reduced, the majority of modern writers are less skeptical than Gibbon of the severity of the persecution. As the author Stephen Williams wrote in 1985, "even allowing a margin for invention, what remains is terrible enough. Unlike Gibbon, we live in an age which has experienced similar things, and knows how unsound is that civilised smile of incredulity at such reports. Things can be, have been, every bit as bad as our worst imaginings."

== See also ==
- Acts of Shmona and of Gurya
- Archelais and Companions
- List of Christians martyred during the reign of Diocletian
