= Leo Allatius =

Greek scholar (1586–1669)

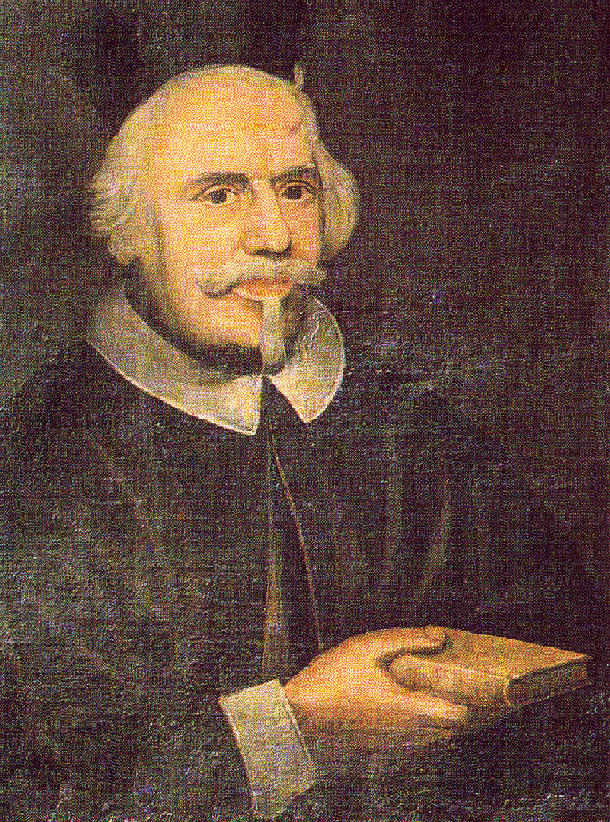
- Leo Allatius, portrait in the Collegio Greco of Rome, Italy
- Born: Λέων Αλλάτιος (Leon Allatios) c. 1586; Chios (Sanjak of Sakız), Ottoman Empire
- Died: January 1669 (aged c. 83); Rome, Papal States
- Occupations: Greek literature, Theology, Philosophy and Medicine
- Writing career
- Movement: Italian Renaissance

Leo Allatius (Note: Greek: Λέων Αλλάτιος, Leon Allatios, Λιωνής Αλάτζης, Lionis Allatzis; Italian: Leone Allacc, Allacio; Latin: Leo Allatius, Allacius) (c. 1586 – January 1669) was a Greek scholar, theologian, and keeper of the Vatican Library.

== Biography ==
Leo Allatius was a Greek, born on the island of Chios (then part of the Ottoman Empire and known as Sakız) in 1586. His father was Niccolas Allatzes (from Orthodox religion) and his mother was Sebaste Neurides, both of Greek extraction (Allatius soon converted himself to Catholicism from Greek Orthodoxy). He was taken by his maternal uncle Michael Nauridis to Italy to be educated at the age of nine, first in Calabria and then in Rome where he was admitted into the Greek college. A graduate of the Pontifical Greek College of Saint Athanasius in Rome, he spent his career in Rome as teacher of Greek at the Greek college, devoting himself to the study of classics and theology. He found a patron in Pope Gregory XV.

In 1622, after the capture of Heidelberg by Tilly, when the Protestant Elector of Bavaria Frederick V was supplanted by a Catholic one, the victorious elector Maximilian of Bavaria presented the Palatinate library composed of 196 cases containing about 3500 manuscripts to Pope Gregory. Allatius supervised its transport by a caravan of 200 mules across the Alps to Rome, where it was incorporated in the Vatican library. All but 39 of the Heidelberg manuscripts, which had been sent to Paris in 1797 and were returned to Heidelberg at the Peace of Paris in 1815, and a gift from Pope Pius VII of 852 others in 1816, remain in the Vatican Library to this day.

Allatius was "passed over" for the position of Vatican librarian and instead became librarian to Cardinal Lelio Biscia who had an extensive private library. On the Cardinal's death, Allatius became librarian to Cardinal Francesco Barberini. Pope Alexander VII appointed him custodian of the Vatican Library in 1661, a post he held until his death.

His cultural background, embracing the Greek and Roman worlds, afforded him a unique view of the age-old question of union to heal the Great Schism. Better than any western scholar of his day he knew the religious, historical and artistic traditions of the Orthodox world, struggling under Ottoman domination. More passionately than any other 17th-century theologian, he believed that familiarity with these traditions would enable the two churches to bridge their theological and ecclesiastical divide.

Thus in 1651, when he published the first printed edition of the works of George Acropolites, the 13th century emissary of the Byzantine Emperor who acknowledged the supremacy of the Roman pontiff and thus had become something of a celebrity, at least in the West, the Latin essay that formed the preface to this volume, De Georgiis eorumque Scriptis, gained fame itself as a learned plea for the commonalities between the two churches.

Allatius was a natural apologist for the Eastern communions in Eastern Europe, convinced as he was in himself that in the acts of union neither reasons of faith nor of doctrine were fundamental to the succession of the bishops, only a transfer of jurisdictions, and he seems really to have believed that the "Latin faith" and the "Greek faith" were identical and that under "Roman obedience" they could still be Orthodox. So he argued in his contribution to the mid-17th century Uniate pamphlet De Ecclesiae occidentalis atque orientalis perpetua consensione libri tres ("The Western and Eastern Churches in perpetual Agreement, in Three Books") (1648). Such notions led to the final stipulations that the Eastern Churches were not to be merged with the Catholic Church but would retain their own hierarchical independence and traditional rituals.

Allatius was trained as a physician. In 1645 he included the first methodical discussion of vampires, in De Graecorum hodie quorundam opinationibus ("On certain modern opinions among the Greeks"). In his later years he collected Greek and Syrian manuscripts to add to the late Pope Gregory XV's Eastern Library at the Vatican.

A member of the Accademia degli Incogniti, he knew many of the figures who wrote Venetian operas. His Drammaturgia (1666), a catalogue of Italian musical dramas produced up to that year, is indispensable for the early history of opera. A new edition, carried down to 1755, appeared at Venice in that year.

His works are listed by Johann Albert Fabricius, in Bibliotheca Graeca (xi. 437), where they are divided into four classes:

- editions, translations and commentaries on ancient authors
- works relating to the dogmas and institutions of the Greek and Roman Churches
- historical works
- miscellaneous works.

His manuscripts (about 150 volumes) and his voluminous scholarly correspondence are held in the Biblioteca Vallicelliana (referred to by some sources as the "Library of the Oratorians") in Rome. The number of his unpublished writings is very large; the majority of them are included in the manuscripts of the Vallicellian Library.

Allatius died in Rome on 18 (or 19) January 1669.

== In popular culture ==
Outside scholarly circles, Allatius is perhaps best known today for his De Praeputio Domini Nostri Jesu Christi Diatriba (Discourse on the Foreskin of Our Lord Jesus Christ), a minor essay mentioned in Fabricius's Bibliotheca Graeca (xiv. 17 § 164) as an unpublished work. According to an unconfirmed nineteenth-century source, its unusual thesis is that the rings of Saturn (then-recently observed by telescope) are the prepuce of Jesus.

== Selected works ==
- (1629) S.P.N. Eustathii Archiepiscopi Antiocheni et martyris in Hexahemeron commentarius, ac de Engastrimytho dissertatio adversus Origenem; item Origenis de eadem Engastrimytho an videlicet anima ipsa Samuelis fuerit vere evocata incantationibus Pythonissae (de qua I. Reg. cap. 28). Lyon: Laurent Durand, 1629
- (1634) De Psellis, et eorum scriptis diatriba at Google Books, Rome
- (1640) De patria Homeri, p. PP5, at Google Books. Lyon: Laurent Durand
- (1645) De Graecorum hodie quorundam opinationibus

Complete title : De templis Graecorum recentioribus, ad Ioannem Morinum; de narthece ecclesiae veteris, ad Gasparem de Simeonibus; nec non de Graecorum hodie quorundam opinationibus, ad Paullum Zacchiam. Leo Allatius, Cologne: Iodocum Kalcovium & Socios

- (1648) De Ecclesiæ occidentalis et orientalis perpetua consensione, p. PR1, at Google Books, Cologne or Amsterdam: Kalckhoven

Complete title : Leonis Allatii De ecclesiae occidentalis atque orientalis perpetua consensione libri tres, ejusdem dissertationes De dominicis et hebdomadibus Graecorum, et De missa praesanctificatorum, cum Bartholdi Nihusii ad hanc annotationibus de communione orientali

- (1655) De utriusquae ecclesiae occidentalis atque orientalis perpetua in dogmate de purgatorio consensione, p. PP5, at Google Books. Rome
- (1666) Drammaturgia. Rome, 1666
  - Expanded edition to 1755 by Ioanne Cardoni, Venice: Giambattista Pasquali, 1755
- (1882) Relazione sul trasporto della Biblioteca Palatina da Heidelberg a Roma pubblicati per la prima volta da Giovanni Beltrani. Florence: Bencini, 1882

== See also ==
- Byzantine scholars in Renaissance

== Bibliography ==
- Grove Dictionary of Music and Musicians, second edition
- Frazee, Charles A., "Leon Allatios: a Greek scholar of the seventeenth century" in Modern Greek Studies Yearbook vol. 1 (1985)
- Gradić Stjepan, "Leonis Allatii vita" in Angelo Mai (ed.), Novae Bibliotheca Patrum Vol. 6 Part 2, Chapter 2. Rome: 1853 (Incomplete biography)
- Hartnup, Karen, On the beliefs of the Greeks: Leo Allatios and popular orthodoxy Excerpts
- Jacono, Carmela, Bibliografica di Leone Allacci (1588–1669): in appendice una nota biografica e una notizia sull' Epistolario Allacciano, 1962 (Bibliography and biographical notice)
- Lämmer, Hugo, De Leonis Allatii codicibus qui Romae in Bibliotheca Vallicellana asservantur schediasma, Herder: 1864.
- Legrand, Émile, Bibliographie hellénique du XVIIe siècle, vol. 3, Paris, 1895, pp. 435–471 (List of works)
- Mazzi, Curzio, Leone Allacci e la Palatina di Heidelberg, Bologne, 1893 (His share in the foundation of the Vatican Library)
- Petit, L., Dictionnaire de théologie catholique (ed. Vacant, Alfred), vol. 1, Paris: 1900, cols. 830–833 (Theological aspect)
- Petit, L., Dictionnaire d'archéologie chrétienne et de liturgie (ed. Cabrol, Fernand), vol. 1, Paris: 1924, p. 1220–1226.
- Musti, Domenico (1960). "ALLACCI, Leone". Dizionario Biografico degli Italiani (in Italian). Vol. 2: Albicante–Ammannati. Rome: Istituto dell'Enciclopedia Italiana. OCLC 883370.
