= Wilhelm Engelmann =

Wilhelm Engelmann was a German publisher and bookseller (August 1, 1808 in Lemgo – December 23, 1878 in Leipzig).

Engelmann was the son of a bookseller in Lemgo, who later moved to Leipzig. He attended Leipzig's Thomasschule and planned an academic career, but was forced to early self-reliance by the early death of his father. He learnt the business from bookseller Theodore Enslin and acquired many valuable business contacts. Subsequently, Engelmann worked for Johann Georg Heyse in Bremen, where he was also concerned with printing, and later for Carl Gerold in Vienna and at Varrentrappstrasse in Frankfurt am Main.

In 1833 he returned to Leipzig and took over the business of his father. His acquaintances in the scientific community gave him a quick start. His publications focused on medicine, history and philology, including works of Georg Gottfried Gervinus, Georg Weber, Edmund Heusinger von Waldegg and Albert von Kölliker. An important series was the Bibliotheca Scriptorum Classicorum, a bibliography of classical philology from 1700 until his death in 1878, continuing Johann Albert Fabricius's Bibliotheca Graeca, Bibliotheca Latina and Bibliotheca Latina Media et Infimae Aetatis. In 1861 he published Bibliotheca zoologica.

Engelmann received an honorary doctorate from the University of Jena. After his death the business was in the hands of his widow and his son Rudolf Engelmann.
