= Ptolemy of Ascalon =

Ancient Greek grammarian from Ascalon

Ptolemy of Ascalon (Ancient Greek: Πτολεμαῖος ὁ Ἀσκαλωνίτης) was a Greek grammarian from Ascalon, a city in Syria near Judaea. According to Stephanus of Byzantium, he was a pupil of Aristarchus and is listed among the distinguished grammarians originating from Ascalon. The Suda records that he taught in Rome.

The titles attributed to him include Homeric Prosody (Προσωδία Ὁμηρική), On Hellenism, i.e. Correct Diction (Περὶ Ἑλληνισμοῦ ἤτοι ὀρθοεπείας), consisting of fifteen books, On Metres (Περὶ μέτρων), On Aristarchus' Textual Criticism of the Odyssey (Περὶ τῆς ἐν Ὀδυσσείᾳ Ἀριστάρχου διορθώσεως), and On Differences of Words (Περὶ διαφορᾶς λέξεων), as well as other grammatical works.

He sided with the scholars of Pergamum and disagreed with Aristarchus about what the correct text of Homer's works should be.

The On Differences of Words was regarded as one of his most important work and served as the foundation for a similar work by Ammonius of Alexandria. Unlike his other writings, it is still extant and was printed in Johann Albert Fabricius' Bibliotheca Graeca.
