= Ascalon =

Ancient city on the Levantine coast known from Ancient, Classical, and Medieval times

- 𐤀𐤔𐤒𐤋𐤍 (Phoenician) אַשְׁקְלוֹן (Hebrew); Ἀσκάλων (Ancient Greek) عَسْقَلَان (Arabic)
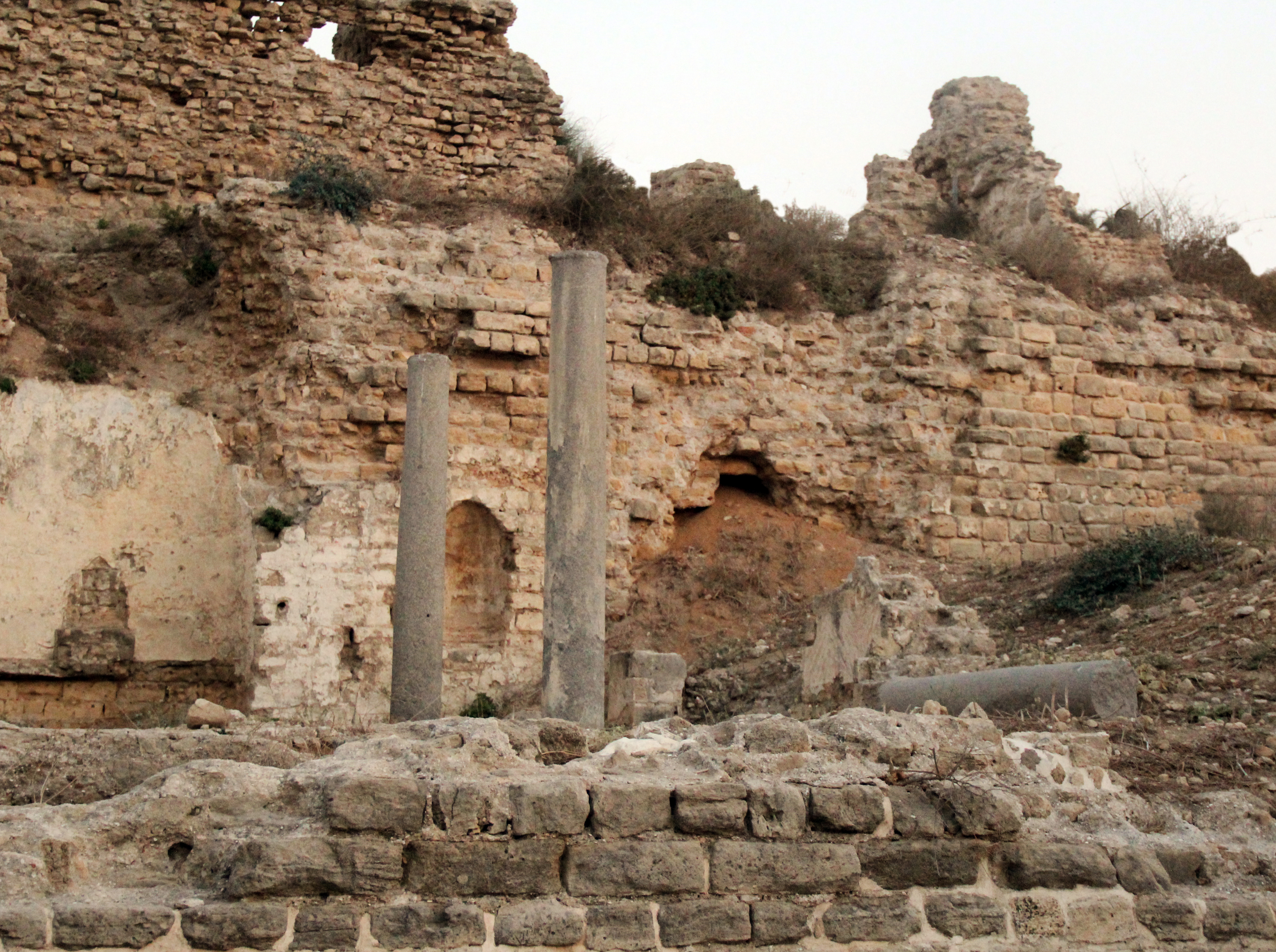
- Remains of the Church of Santa Maria Viridis

- Location within Israel
- 31°39′43″N 34°32′46″E
- Type: Settlement
- Periods: Bronze Age to Crusades
- Cultures: Canaanite, Philistine, Phoenician, Crusaders
- Location: Southern District, Israel
- Region: Southern Levant, Middle East

History
- Built: c. 2000 BCE
- Abandoned: 1270 CE

Site notes
- Excavation dates: 1815, 1920–1922, 1985–2016
- Archaeologists: Lady Hester Stanhope, John Garstang, W. J. Phythian-Adams, Lawrence Stager, Daniel Master

Ascalon or Ashkelon (Note: Philistine: 𐤀𐤔𐤒𐤋𐤍, romanized: *ʾAšqalōn; Hebrew: אַשְׁקְלוֹן, romanized: ʾAšqəlōn; Koine Greek: Ἀσκάλων, romanized: Askálōn; Latin: Ascalon; Arabic: عَسْقَلَان, romanized: ʿAsqalān) was an ancient Near East port city on the Mediterranean coast of the southern Levant of high historical and archaeological significance. Its remains are located in the archaeological site of Tel Ashkelon, within the city limits of the modern Israeli city of Ashkelon. Traces of settlement exist from the 3rd millennium BCE, with evidence of city fortifications emerging in the Middle Bronze Age. During the Late Bronze Age, it was integrated into the Egyptian Empire, before becoming one of the five cities of the Philistine pentapolis following the migration of the Sea Peoples. The city was later destroyed by the Babylonians but was subsequently rebuilt.

Ascalon remained a major metropolis throughout the classical period, as a Hellenistic city persisting into the Roman period. Christianity began to spread in the city in the 4th century CE. During the Middle Ages it came under Islamic rule, before becoming a highly contested fortified foothold on the coast during the Crusades. Two significant Crusader battles took place in the city: the Battle of Ascalon in 1099, and the Siege of Ascalon in 1153. The Mamluk sultan Baybars ordered the destruction (slighting) of the city fortifications and the harbour in 1270 to prevent any further military use, though structures such as the Shrine of Husayn's Head survived. The nearby town of al-Majdal was established in the same period. The village of Al-Jura existed adjacent to the deserted city until 1948.

== Names ==
Ascalon has been known by many variations of the same basic name over the millennia. It is speculated that the name comes from the Northwest Semitic and possibly Canaanitic triliteral root ṯ-q-l 'to weigh', which is also the triliteral root of the word shekel. The ʔa + root construction, commonly used in Arabic and some other Central and Western Semitic languages (such as Hebrew), and seen in nearby place names like Ashdod and Achziv, could be either an elative (ie. "weightist") or plural (ie. "weights).

The settlement is first mentioned in the Execration texts from the 18th-19th centuries BCE as Asqalānu. Seven of the Amarna letters (c. 1350 BCE), are from King Yidya of Ašqaluna to Akhenaten, the pharaoh of the New Kingdom of Egypt, with the name showing evidence of the ā to ō Canaanite shift. The shift was not consistently applied, as in the Kadesh inscriptions (c. 1274 BCE), it appears again with its long ā vowel form, ʾAsqalāna. The Merneptah Stele (c. 1208 BCE), recounts that Merneptah, pharaoh of the Nineteenth Dynasty, put down a rebellion there: "Plundered is Israel with every evil; Carried off is Asqaluni". The settlement is also mentioned eleven times in the Hebrew Bible as ʾAšqəlōn.

In the Hellenistic period, Askálōn emerged as the Koine Greek name for the city, persisting through the Roman Empire and later Byzantine Empire.

In the Early Islamic period, the official Arabic form ʿAsqalān revived the original long ā form. The Crusaders of the Kingdom of Jerusalem called it Ascalon. The Arabic adjectival nisba al-Asqalani is still used to denote those from Ascalon, like Ibn Hajar al-Asqalani, or its successor city al-Majdal, Asqalan.

In Modern Hebrew, it is known as Ashkelon. Today, Ascalon is a designated archaeological area known as Tel Ashkelon ("Mound of Ascalon") and administered as Ashkelon National Park.

== Geographical setting ==
Ascalon lies on the Mediterranean coast, 16 km. north of Gaza City and 14 km. south of Ashdod and Ashdod-Yam. Around 15 million years ago, a river flowed from inland to the sea here. It was later covered by fossilized sandstone ridges (kurkar), formed by sand that was washed to the shores from the Nile Delta. The river became an underground water source, which was later exploited by Ascalon's residents for the constructions of wells. The oldest well found at Ascalon dates around 1000 BCE.

== Neolithic and Chalcolithic Ages ==
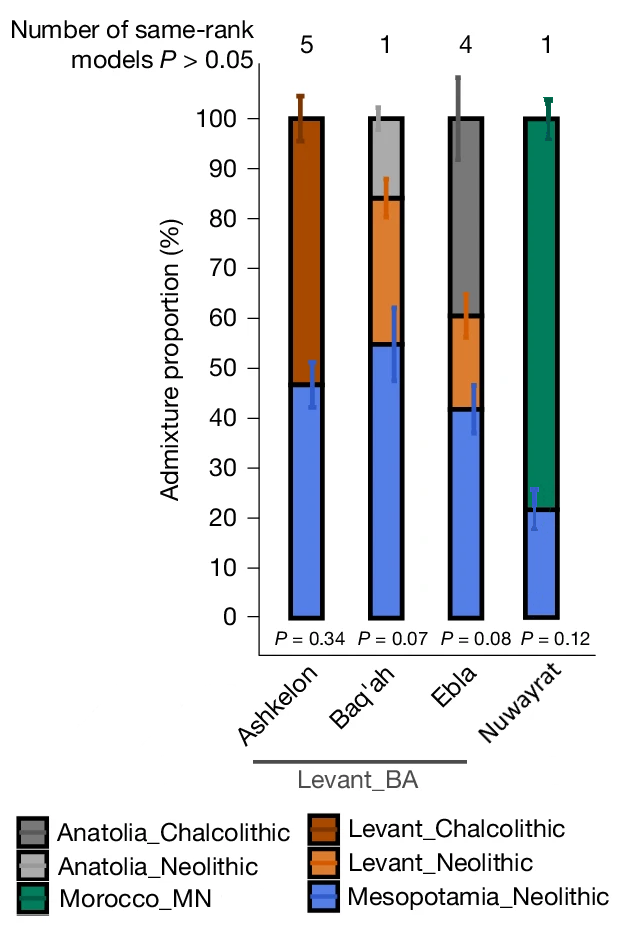
Ancestry proportions of Ascalon, Ebla, Baq'ah and Nuwayrat Bronze Age samples for the best-fit full model (qpAdm).

The remains of prehistoric activity and settlement at Ashkelon were revealed in salvage excavations prior to urban development in the Afridar and Marina neighborhoods of modern Ashkelon, some 1.5 kilometres (1 mi) north of Tel Ashkelon. The fieldwork was conducted in the 1950s under the supervision of Jean Perrot and in 1997–1998 under the supervision of Yosef Garfinkel.

The earliest traces of human activity include some 460 microlithic tools dated to the Epipalaeolithic period (c. 23,000 to c. 10,000 BCE). These come along wide evidence for hunter-gatherer exploitation in the southern coastal plain in that time. This activity came to hiatus during the early periods of sedentation in the Levant, and resumed only during the pre-pottery C phase of the Neolithic (c. 7000–6400 BCE). Jean Perrot's excavation revealed eight dwelling pits, along with silos and installations, while Garfinkel's excavations revealed numerous pits, hearths and animal bones.

== Bronze Age ==
=== Early Bronze Age ===
During the Early Bronze Age I period (EB I, 3700–2900 BCE), human settlement thrived in Ashkelon. The central site was in Afridar, situated between two long and wide kurkar ridges. This area had unique ecological conditions, offering an abundance of goundwater, fertile soils and varied flora and fauna. Two other settlements existed at Tel Ashkelon itself, and in the Barnea neighborhood of modern Ashkelon. The site of Afridar is one of the most extensive and most excavated settlements of the EB I period, with over two dozen dig sites, excavated by the Israel Antiquities Authority (IAA). The flourishment of EB I Ashkelon has also been linked to trade relations with Prehistoric Egypt. The site of Afridar was abandoned at the start of the EB II period (c. 2900 BCE). It was suggested that the cause for the abandonment was a climate change causing increased precipitation, which destroyed the ecological conditions which had served the locals for centuries.

In the EB II–III (2900–2500 BCE), the site of Tel Ashkelon served as an important seaport for the trade route between the Old Kingdom of Egypt and Byblos. Excavations at the northern side of the mound revealed a mudbrick structure and numerous olive-oil jars. This port was abandoned with the deurbanization of Canaan during the second half of the 3rd millennium BCE (Intermediate Bronze Age). At that time, the center of settlement moved to the unwalled rural settlement at Barne'a.

=== Middle Bronze Age (Canaanite Asqanu) ===
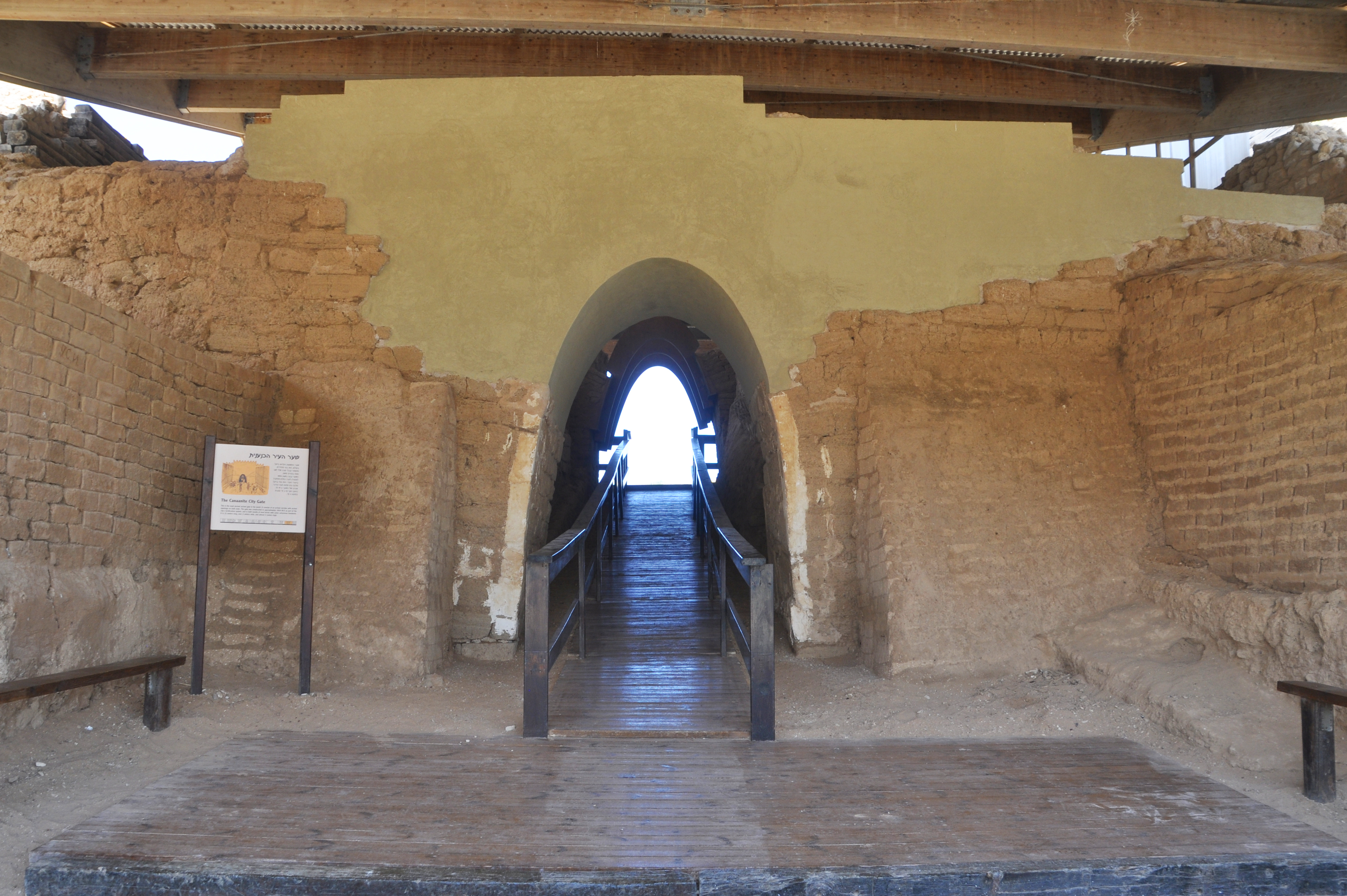
Restored Canaanite city gate (2014)

Ashkelon was resettled in the Middle Bronze Age on the background of country-wide urban renaissance, linked to the immigration of Amorites people from the north, as well as the revival of trade relations between Middle Kingdom of Egypt and Byblos. It soon become the fortified center of a city-kingdom, as evidenced by both historical records and archaeology. Ashkelon first mention in historical records is in the Egyptian Execration Texts from the time of the Twelfth Dynasty of Egypt (20th–19th centuries BCE). These texts were written on red pots, which were broken as part of a cursing ritual against Egypt's enemies. Ashkelon appears three times under the name Asqanu (ꜥIsqꜥnw), along with three of its rulers ḫꜥykm (or Khalu-Kim), ḫkṯnw and Isinw. These names of Northwest Semitic origin, are identified as Amorites. Scholars have suggested Ashkelon was one of many Levantine city-states established by Amorites in the early second millennium BCE.

==== Middle Bronze II ====
The most distinctive feature of the site of Ashkelon is its fortifications, consisting of free-standing earthen ramparts which were erected as early as around 1800 BCE. In the excavations of the northern slope of the ramparts, archaeologists detected five phases of construction including city gates, moats, guard towers and in a later phase, a sanctuary right after the entrance to the city. The material culture and especially Egyptian-style pottery showed that Middle Bronze Ashkelon lasted until around 1560 BCE.

Chronology with dates based on pottery chronology.

- Phase 15 (Early MB IIA) | Pre-Rampart occupation. A return of settlers after the site had been largely abandoned seince the EB IIIB.
- Phase 14 (Late MB IIA; c. 1770-1740 BCE) | The Arched Gate is a mudbrick gate arguably the oldest known monumental arch in the world. Compare Tell el-Dab'a Stratum G/4. First appearance of Middle Cypriot imports (White Painted III-IV) and Levantine Painted Style pottery.
- Phase 13 (Final MB IIA; c. 1740-1700 BCE). Compare Tell el-Dab'a Stratum G3/1.
- Phase 12 (MB IIB; c. 1700-1650 BCE)
- Phase 11 (MB IIC; c. 1650-1560 BCE) | The Ramparts with defensive glacis systems reached their maximum scale. Contemporary with the Hyksos period (Tell el-Daba Stratum D/3).
- Phase 10 (MB IIC/LB IA; c. 1560-1530 BCE)

=== Late Bronze Age (Egyptian rule) ===
==== Early decades of Egyptian rule (15th century BCE) ====
Ashkelon came under the control of the New Kingdom of Egypt in the time of Thutmose III, following the Battle of Megiddo (1457 BCE). During the Late Bronze Age, its territory stretched across the coastal plain, bordering Gaza to the south, Lachish and Gezer to the east and Gezer to the north.

The ties between Ashkelon and Egypt in the late 15h century are documented in Papyrus Hermitage 1116A, which is dated to the time of Amenhotep II (1427–1401 BCE). It includes list compiled by an Egyptian official detailing rations of bread and beer, that were provided to envoys of noble chariot warriors (Maryannu) from 12 Canaanite cities, including Ashkelon. It is believed that these envoys were securing the caravans that carried tribute to the Egyptian king, and that they served as his loyal ambassadors.

==== Amarna period (14th century BCE) ====
During the Amarna Period (mid-14th century BCE, mostly during the reign of Akhenaten), Ashkelon maintained its ties to Egypt. Over a dozen letters inscribed in clay that were found in the Amarna letters are linked to Ashkelon. A petrographic analysis of the clay used in five letters sent by a ruler named Shubandu have supported the hypothesis that he ruled Ashkelon.

After Shubandu, Ashkelon was ruled by Yidya. Seven of his letters were identified (letters no. 320–326, 370). In these he expressed his loyalty to the king and assured he will provision the Egyptian troops with bread, beer, oil, grain and cattle. In another letter sent to the king (no. 287) Abdi-Heba, the ruler of Jerusalem, accuses Yidya, as well as the rulers of Lachish and Gezer of provisioning the ʿApiru, who were adversaries of the Egyptian empire. In another letter, Yidya is asked to send glass ingots to Egypt.

==== Final years of Egyptian rule (late 13th century – 1170 BCE) ====
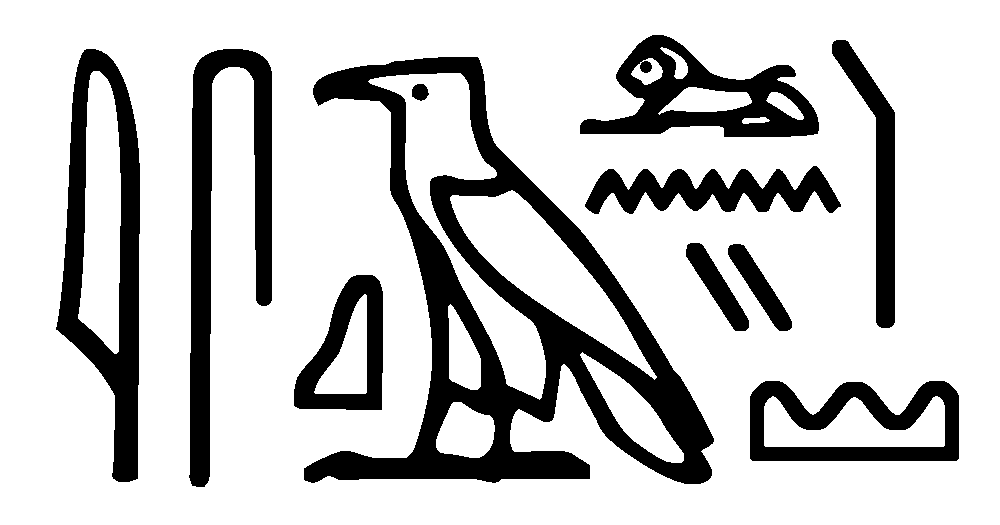
"'Asqaluni" written on the Merneptah Stele

At the end of the 19th Dynasty, the Merneptah Stele from c. 1208 BCE commemorates the victory of Merneptah against the rebellious cities of Ashkelon, Gezer, Yenoam and the Israelites.

The Transitional LBA IIB/IA IA in the early part of the 20th Dynasty of Egypt, saw the Egyptian Empire fall and lose control over parts of the Southern Levant. At Medinet Habu, Ramesses III in his Year 8 had to fight a massive invasion by the "Sea Peoples", including the Peleset (Philistines).

== Iron Age ==
=== Iron Age I ===
In Iron IA, the late 20th Dynasty were mere nominal rulers. In Iron IB, the 21st Dynasty centered at Tanis gained some influence again.

==== Philistine Ashkelon (1170–604 BCE) ====
The founding of Philistine Ashkelon, on top of the Egyptian-ruled Canaanite city, was dated by the site's excavators to c. 1170 BCE. Their earliest pottery, types of structures and inscriptions are similar to the early Greek urbanised centre at Mycenae in mainland Greece, adding evidence to the conclusion that they were one of the "Sea Peoples" that upset cultures throughout the Eastern Mediterranean at that time. There was also the first appearance of locally produced Mycenaean IIIC wares.

In this period, the Hebrew Bible presents Ashkelon as one of the five Philistine cities that are constantly warring with the Israelites.

The Onomasticon of Amenope, dated to the early 11th century BCE, mentioned Ashkelon along with Gaza and Ashdod as cities of the Philistines.

=== Iron Age II ===
In 2012, an Iron Age IIA Philistine cemetery was discovered outside the city. In 2013, 200 of the cemetery's estimated 1,200 graves were excavated. Seven were stone-built tombs. One ostracon and 18 jar handles were found to be inscribed with the Cypro-Minoan script. The ostracon was of local material and dated to 12th to 11th century BCE. Five of the jar handles were manufactured in coastal Lebanon, two in Cyprus, and one locally. Fifteen of the handles were found in an Iron I context and the rest in Late Bronze Age context.

At the start of the 22nd Dynasty of Egypt, Shoshenq I (r. 943-922 BCE) conducted a military campaign into the Southern Levant. However, Philistine toponyms are not mentioned in his inscriptions on the Bubastite Portal at Karnak, indicating that he by-passed the Philistine plain and cities such as Ashkelon, Ashdod, Ekron, Gath and Gaza.

==== Assyrian vassal and (734 – c. 620 BCE) ====
By 734 BCE, Ashkelon was captured by the Neo-Assyrian Empire, under the reign of Tiglath-Pileser III. Following the Assyrian campaign, Ashkelon, along with other southern Levantine kingdoms, paid tribute to Assyria, and thus became a vassal kingdom. A year later, while the Assyrians were preoccupied fighting Damascus, king Mitinti I of Ashkelon joined Israel, Tyre and Arab tribes in a revolt against Assyrian hegemony. The revolt failed and Mitinti I was killed and replaced by Rukibtu. The identity of Rukibtu is unknown. It has been conjectured that he was the son of Mitinti I. Otherwise it was suggested that he was a usurper, either one who was installed by the Assyrians, or one who usurped the throne on his own behalf, and secured his rule through accepting Assyrian subjugation. Either way, after Rukibu's ascension, Ashkelon resumed paying annual tributes to Assyria.

Somewhere towards the end of the 8th century BCE, Sidqa usurped the throne, and joined the rebellion instigated by king Hezekiah of Judah, along with other Levantine kings. Together, they deposed king Padi of Ekron who remained loyal to Assyria. The rebellion, which was launched shortly after Sennacherib's was suppressed during his third campaign In 701 BCE, as described in the Taylor Prism. At that time, Ashkelon controlled several cities in the Yarkon River basin (near modern Tel Aviv, including Beth Dagon, Jaffa, Beneberak and Azor). These were seized and sacked during the Assyrian campaign. Sidqa himself was exiled with all of his family and was replaced Šarru-lu-dari, the son of Rukibtu, who resumed paying tribute to Assyria. During most of the 7th century BCE, Ashkelon was ruled by Mitinti II, the son of Sidqa, who was a vassal to Esarhaddon and Ashurbanipal.

==== Under Egypt and the Babylonian destruction (c. 620–604 BCE) ====
Close connections between Ashkelon and Egypt developed in the days of pharaoh Psamtik I, after Egypt filled the power vacuum due to the withdrawal of the Assyrian empire from the West. This is demonstrated by the discovery of multiple Egyptian trade items, such as barrel-jars and tripods made of Nile clay, a jewelry box made of abalone shell together with a necklace of amulets. Egyptian cultic and votive items, statuettes and offering tables were likewise discovered, demonstrating a religious influence as well. According to Herodotus (c.484–c.425 BCE), the city's temple of Aphrodite (Derketo) was the oldest of its kind, imitated even in Cyprus, and he mentions that this temple was pillaged by marauding Scythians during the time of their sway over the Medes (653–625 BCE).

By the end of the 7th century BCE, Ashkelon's population is estimated to have been 10,000–12,000. It had fortifications which integrated and developed the Canaanite ramparts, in addition to an estimated 50 protective towers. Industry included wine and olive oil production and export, and possibly textile weaving. Archaeobotanical analysis of the 604 BCE destruction deposits reveals that local agricultural production was supplemented by grain imports from beyond the city's immediate hinterland; weed species preserved with wheat suggest trade links extending into the Judean Hills and regions farther north.Together with Ashdod, it is the site most abundant with Red-Slipped ware, both imported and locally made, which decreases greatly further inland. Imports further included amphorae, elegant bowls and cups, "Samaria ware", and red and cream polished tableware from Phoenicia, together with amphorae and decorated fine-ware from Ionia, Corinth, Cyprus and the Greek islands.

The history of Philistine Ashkelon came to an end as the last of the Philistine cities to hold out against Babylonian king Nebuchadnezzar II. By the month of Kislev (November or December) 604 BCE, the city was burnt, destroyed and its king Agaʾ taken into exile. The destruction of Ashkelon is reported in the Babylonian Chronicles and from a poem found in Oxyrhynchus, Egypt, written by Greek poet Alcaeus whose brother, Antimenidas, served in the Babylonian army as a mercenary. As for the reason for Its destruction, it is noted by scholars that it came one year after the Assyrian-Egyptian defeat in the battle of Carchemish. Concern over the strong Egyptian influence on Ashkelon, and possibly its direct rule may be what brought Nebuchadnezzar II to reduce Ashkelon to rubble, ahead of the failed Babylonian invasion of Egypt. With the Babylonian destruction, the Philistine era was over. After its destruction, Ashkelon remained desolate for seventy years, until the Persian period.

== Classical Age ==
=== Persian period (c. 520–332 BCE) ===
Following the Babylonian destruction, Ashkelon was deserted for about 80 years. While there are few historical sources about Ashkelon after the Achaemenid Empire took over, archaeological investigations reveal that it was rebuilt around 520–510 BCE (based on ceramic evidence). The Greek historian Herodotus has probably visited Ashkelon as part of his voyage in the 440s BCE and described the city's residents as Phoenicians. It was one of the first coastal sites to be established the by Phoenicians, and in Ashkelon's case, by Tyre, as attested by the Periplus of Pseudo-Scylax from the mid-4th century BCE. Many inscriptions in the Phoenician language were found across the site, including ostraca bearing Phoenician names from the late 6th to late 4th centuries BCE, and one East Greek vase with the Phoenician word for "cake" inscribed on it. The cult of the goddess Tanit was present at Ashkelon by that period. The city minted its own coins, with the abbreviation Aleph-Nun referring to its name.

The archaeological excavations revealed remains of the Achaemenid (Persian) period in three main locations (Grids 38, 50 and 57). The city features monumental structures constructed of ashlar stone foundations and mudbrick superstructures. It had a city plan of streets with workshops and large warehouses by the shore. In these warehouses, many imported vessels and raw materials from the Mediterranean Sea and Ancient Near East were discovered. The origin of these imports is primarily Phoenicia and the Greek regions of Attica, Corinth and Magna Graecia, as well as Cyprus, Egypt and Mesopotamia. Among those findings are luxury items such as aryballoi, black-figure and red-figure pottery, Ionian cups, athenian owl cups and a figurine of the ancient Egyptian god Osiris, made of bronze. These were dated to the entire span of the period and attest to Ashkelon's role as a major sea port.

A unique discovery in the archaeology of Ashkelon is the large dog cemetery, located within a prime location in the center of the city. Archaeologists excavated over 800 dog burials, dated between early 5th and late 4th centuries BCE. It was suggested that the inhabitants of Ashkelon viewed the dogs as sacred animals. The dogs were given special treatment in their burial, with each being interred in a shallow pit and their bones were always found in the same position. The dogs of the Canaan Dog breed, were both male and female, the majority were puppies but also matures. It is evident they died of natural causes, without human intervention or epidemic. Dogs played a role in Phoenician society and religion in that time.

== Hellenistic period (332–37 BCE) ==
=== Conquest of Alexander and the Wars of the Diadochi (332–301 BCE) ===
Alexander the Great captured the Levant in 332 BCE and reigned until 323 BCE. No known historical source describe what happened to Ascalon during that time. It was speculated that, following Alexander's seven month long siege and subsequent destruction Tyre, Ascalon's residents surrendered peacefully to his forces. This is further suggested by the Ascalon's absence from accounts of the two-month-long Siege of Gaza, its southern neighbor. The city's history in the final years of the 4th century BCE remains obscure. During this time, the region changed hands multiple times amid the conflict between Ptolemaic and Antigonid kingdoms, as part of the Wars of the Diadochi. These wars concluded with a Ptolemaic victory in the Levant in 301 BCE.

=== Ptolemaic rule (301–198 BCE) ===
Archaeological excavations have uncovered evidence of violent destruction across the site, dated around 290 BCE. This period corresponds to the reign of Ptolemy I Soter during which the Ptolemaic Kingdom was consolidating its control over the Levant. Remains of collapsed and burnt structures were found, along with two hoards of silver coins discovered within the destruction layers, one of which appears to have been hastily buried by a resident shortly before the destruction.

Few historical records refer to Ascalon under Ptolemaic rule, a time generally characterized by limited documentation. The city is listed alongside Gaza, Jaffa and Acre, as one of the four prominent ports in the Southern Levant in the Letter of Aristeas, dated to the reign of Ptolemy II Philadelphus (r. 285 – 246 BCE). Ascalon appears once in the Zenon Papyri, (Note: Over 2,000 papyri written by Zenon of Kaunos were discovered in Egypt. Of these, only 40 had any reference to the region of the southern Levant.) the correspondence of Zenon of Kaunos, private secretary to Apollonius, the Ptolemaic finance minister, around 259 BCE. his limited mention suggests that Ascalon held a secondary status compared to other coastal cities, particularly Gaza, which is referenced numerous times. According to Josephus (Antiquities of the Jews), Ascalon's residents refused to pay taxes to Joseph ben Tobia a Jewish tax-farmer appointed by Ptolemy III Euergetes around 242 BCE, and even insulted him. In response, Joseph had twenty of the cirty's nobles, and seized their property as tribute to the king, likely intended as a warning to other cities.

During the Fourth Syrian War (219–217 BC), the Ptolemaic kingdom fought the Seleucid Empire under Antiochus III the Great, who sought to reclaim former lands. Ascalon was likely captured by the Seleucids during this conflict, along with Gaza, prior to the Battle of Raphia (217 BCE). That battle ended in a Ptolemaic victory and the restoration of lost territories, including Ascalon. In 202 BCE, Antiochus III launched another campaign into the region, capturing Gaza after a prolonged siege. Ascalon was probably taken without resistance. However it was briefly retaken in the winter of 201/200 BCE by the Ptolemaic general Scopas of Aetolia. His forces were later defeated by the Seleucids at the Battle of Panium (200 BCE) and the Seleucid control over the country was consolidated by 198 BCE.

=== Seleucid rule (198–103 BCE) ===
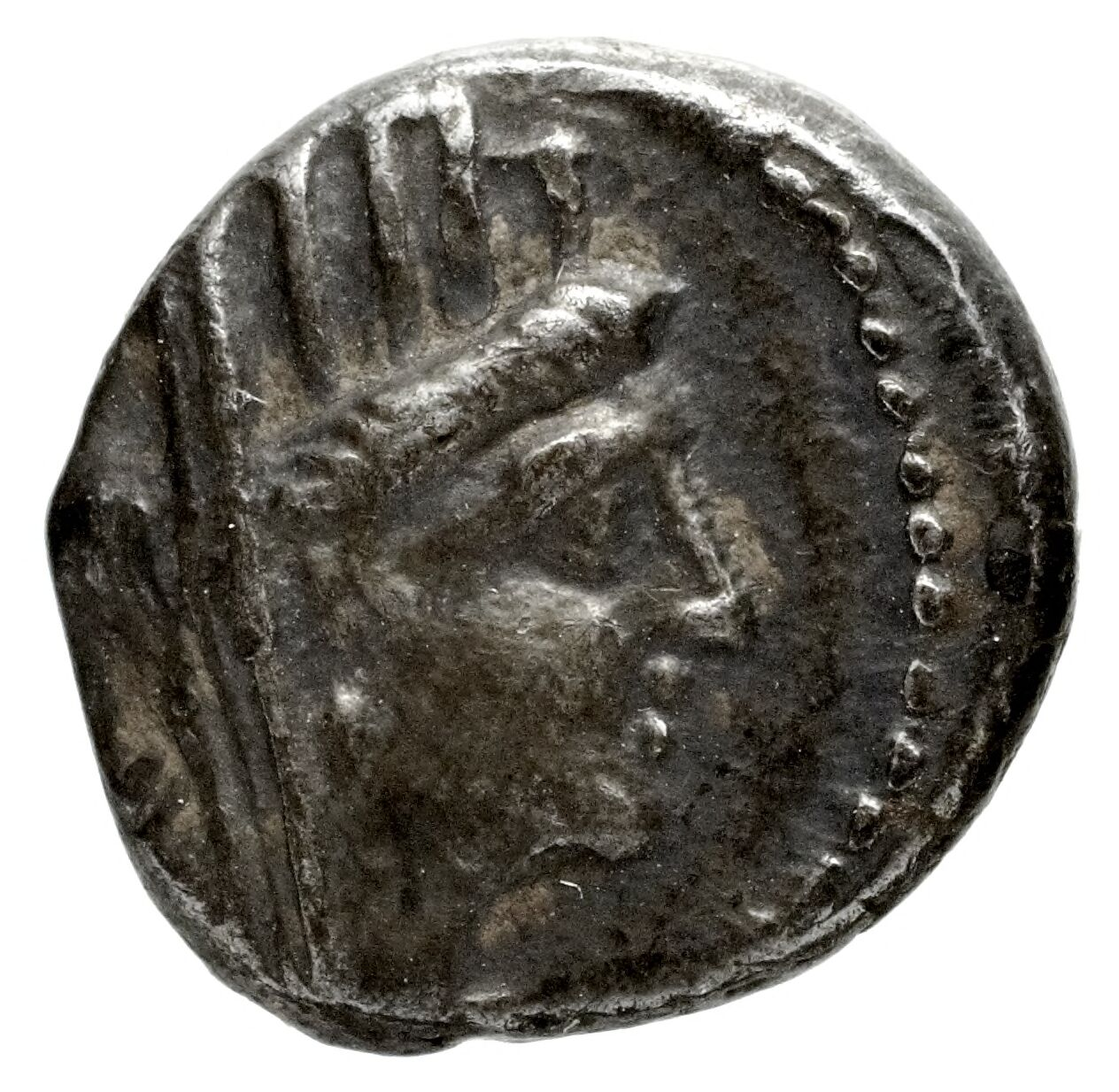
Silver coin, half a drachma, depicting the head of the goddess Tyche, minted at Ascalon, Palestine in 111-109 BC

Following the transition of to Seleucid rule, the balance of power between Ascalon and Gaza shifted. Gaza lost its status as the principal port for trade caravans arriving from the Arabian Peninsula. By 169/168 BCE, during the reign of Antiochus IV Epiphanes (r. 175 – 164 BCE), Ascalon was one of 19 cities across the empire granted minting rights. Historians have proposed several reasons for this policy, including efforts to enlist key cities in the empire's postwar reconstruction or purely financial motives. The coins minted in Ascalon constitute a key body of evidence for reconstructing the city's political history during the late Hellenistic period.

An autonomous coin minted in 168/167 BCE (Note: Year 145 in the Seleucid era) provides the only direct evidence that Ascalon held polis status by that time. The coin features a portrait of the Greek goddess Tyche on one side, and the bow of a warship with the inscriptions "of the Ascalonians" and "of the demos" on the other side. The exact timing of when cities received polis status remains debated among scholars. Some argue that such status was granted as early as the Ptolemaic rule. Gideon Fuks suggested that Seleucus IV Philopator (r. 187 – 175 BCE) conferred polis rights to various cities as part of a decentralization policy intended to strengthen local control over rural hinterlands. He further argued that cities such as Ascalon paid substantial sums for these rights, providing much-needed revenue to the Seleucid state in the aftermath of prolonged warfare.

==== Political history during the Seleucid Dynastic wars ====
The political landscape of the region changed dramatically following the Maccabean Revolt (167–141 BCE), the establishment of the Hasmonean Kingdom in Jerusalem, and the outbreak of the Seleucid Dynastic Wars in 157 BCE. In 153 BCE, under pressure from Hasmonean leader Jonathan Apphus, Ascalon supported the claim of Alexander Balas against incumbent Seleucid king, Demetrius I Soter. After Balas was killed in 145 BCE, Ascalon briefly supported Demetrius II Nicator, but Jonathan again compelled the city to recognize Antiochus VI Dionysus, the son of Balas.

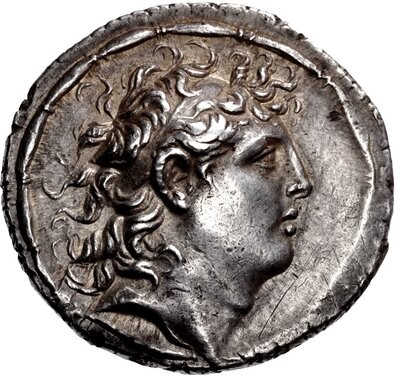
Coin of Diodotus Tryphon, Antioch mint

When Diodotus Tryphon seized power in 142 BCE, the Ascalon mint began issuing coins bearing his portrait. Antiochus VII Sidetes later challenged Tryphon, becoming the sole ruler of the Seleucid Empire in 138 BCE. Often regarded as the last strong Seleucid monarch, Sidetes retained control over the Levantine coast, including Ascalon, while the Hasmoneans held Jaffa to the north.

Following Sidetes death in 129 BCE, the Seleucid Empire fell into renewed civil war. Around 126–123 BCE, Ascalon came under the control of Alexander II Zabinas, a usurper backed by Ptolemaic Kingdom to the south. His brief reign ended when the Ptolemaics shifted their support to his rival, Antiochus VIII Grypus, who defeated Zabinas in 123/122 BCE and took power. Grypus's mother Cleopatra Thea, acted as both queen consort and as the de facto ruler. Coins minted in Ascalon from this period depict both her and Gryphus until her death in 121 BCE, when she was attempting to assassinate of her son. From 120 and 114 BCE, Ascalon's coinage featured only Gryphus portrait.

In 114/113 BCE, Gryphus' half-brother, Antiochus IX Cyzicenus, launched a campaign to seize the throne. He captured most of the Selecuid territory, including Ascalon, which minted coins in his name for two years, until 112/111 BCE. Historians suggest that both the Ptolemaic Kingdom and Hasmonean dynasty may have aided Gryphus in the retaking of Ascalon. Around this time, the city was granted the status of a "holy" and "inviolable" city, likely exempting it from certain taxes and granting it partial of full autonomy, including immunity from legal enforcement actions, except in cases of offenses against the Seleucid king.

=== Independent Ascalon (103–63 BCE) ===
By 103 BCE Ascalon began using its own calendar, formally marking its independence. The city remained neutral during the 103–102 BCE conflict involving Hasmonean Alexander Jannaeus (r. 103 – 76 BCE), the exiled Ptolemy IX Soter (Lathyrus) who invaded from Cyprus, and the reigning Ptolemaic queen of Egypt, Cleopatra III. Ascalon is thought to have maintained amicable relations with both the Hasmoneans and Ptolemaic Egypt, a diplomatic stance that likely contributed to its continued autonomy. This is supported by the fact that, while Jannaeus conquered the southern coastal region and destroyed Gaza in 95/94 BCE, Ascalon remained untouched, making it the only independent Hellenistic coastal city south of Acre. It continued to maintain friendly relations with both powers for the next four decades until the conquest of Pompey.

The Jerusalem Talmud recounts a story about a significant case of an early witch-hunt, during the reign of the Hasmonean queen Salome Alexandra. the court of Simeon ben Shetach sentenced to death eighty women in Ascalon who had been charged with sorcery.

== Roman period (63 BCE – 4th century CE) ==
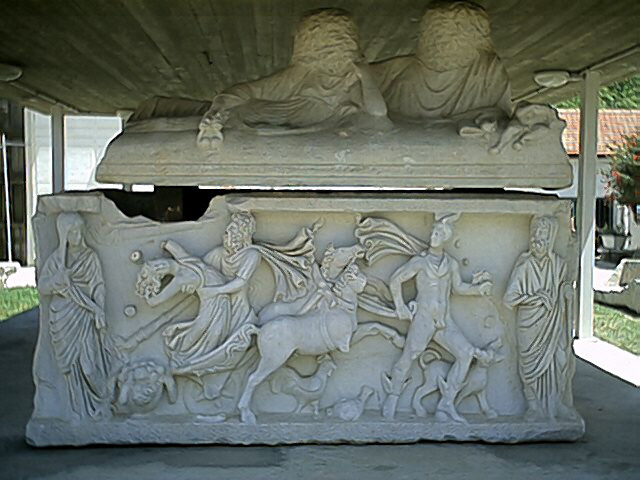
Roman sarcophagus in Ashkelon

By 63 BCE, Roman general Pompey conquered the territories of the Hasmonean Kingdom, bringing the region under Roman control for nearly seven centuries. Pompey granted freedom to the Hellenistic cities and incorporated them into Province of Syria. Ascalon, however, was recognized as civitas libera et immunis, a free and exempt city. This status allowed it to retain autonomy over its internal affairs, including the authority to establish local laws. Ascalon was also exempt from hosting Roman soldiers and statesmen, and possibly paying taxes, though the latter remains uncertain. Nevertheless, the city was subject to Roman authority in foreign affairs and was obligated to provide military recruits when required.

During the first two decades of Roman rule, members of the family of the former Hasmonean king Aristobulus II sought refuge in Ascalon. This is known from accounts of Caesar's civil war, which began 49 BCE, when they were rescued from Ascalon by Ptolemy (son of Mennaeus), and taken to Chalchis (modern Anjar, Lebanon). Later, in 47 BCE, Julius Caesar was fighting the Ptolemaic Kingdom, who besieged him in Alexandria. A relief force led by Mithridates II of the Bosporus assembled in Ascalon, before marcing to Pelusium and ultimately lifting the siege. Following Caesar's assassination in 44 BCE, the Empire descended into renewed instability. In 40 BCE, the Parthian Empire invaded the eastern provinces and captured the Levant, including Ascalon. The Parthians installed Antigonus II Mattathias, son of Aristobolus II—who had previously taken refuge in Ascalon—as king, making him the last ruler of the Hasmonean dynasty. His reign was short-lived. In 37 BCE, he was deposed by Herod the Great, who was appointed by Rome as the client-king of Judea.

Ascalon was never included in the territory of Herod the Great. However, it is listed among the cities outside his domain where he financed major construction projects. According to Josephus, Herod built bath houses, elaborate fountains and large colonnades in the city. It is known that his daughter Salome inherited a "palace in Ascalon". Some historians have speculated that this was a residence originally built for Herod himself, suggesting that he maintained amicable relations with the city, despite its political autonomy. A discredited tradition even suggests Ascalon was his birthplace. In 6 CE, when a Roman imperial province was set in Judea, overseen by a lower-rank governor, Ascalon was moved directly to the higher jurisdiction of the governor of Syria province.

Ascalon had a Hellenistic population. Talmudic sources attest that it had some Jewish population in the early Roman period. The Hellenistic–Jewish scholar Philo recounts that during the Alexandrian riots (38 CE) against Jews, the inhabitants of Ascalon resented the Jews deeply, but that does not imply there were no Jews in the city. Josephus recounts that during the First Jewish–Roman War, Jewish rebels attacked Ascalon and that in retaliation the Ascalonians massacred 2,500 Jews in or around the city. With that said, several Talmud sources attest to continued Jewish presence in the city after these events.

== Byzantine period (4th century – 641 CE) ==
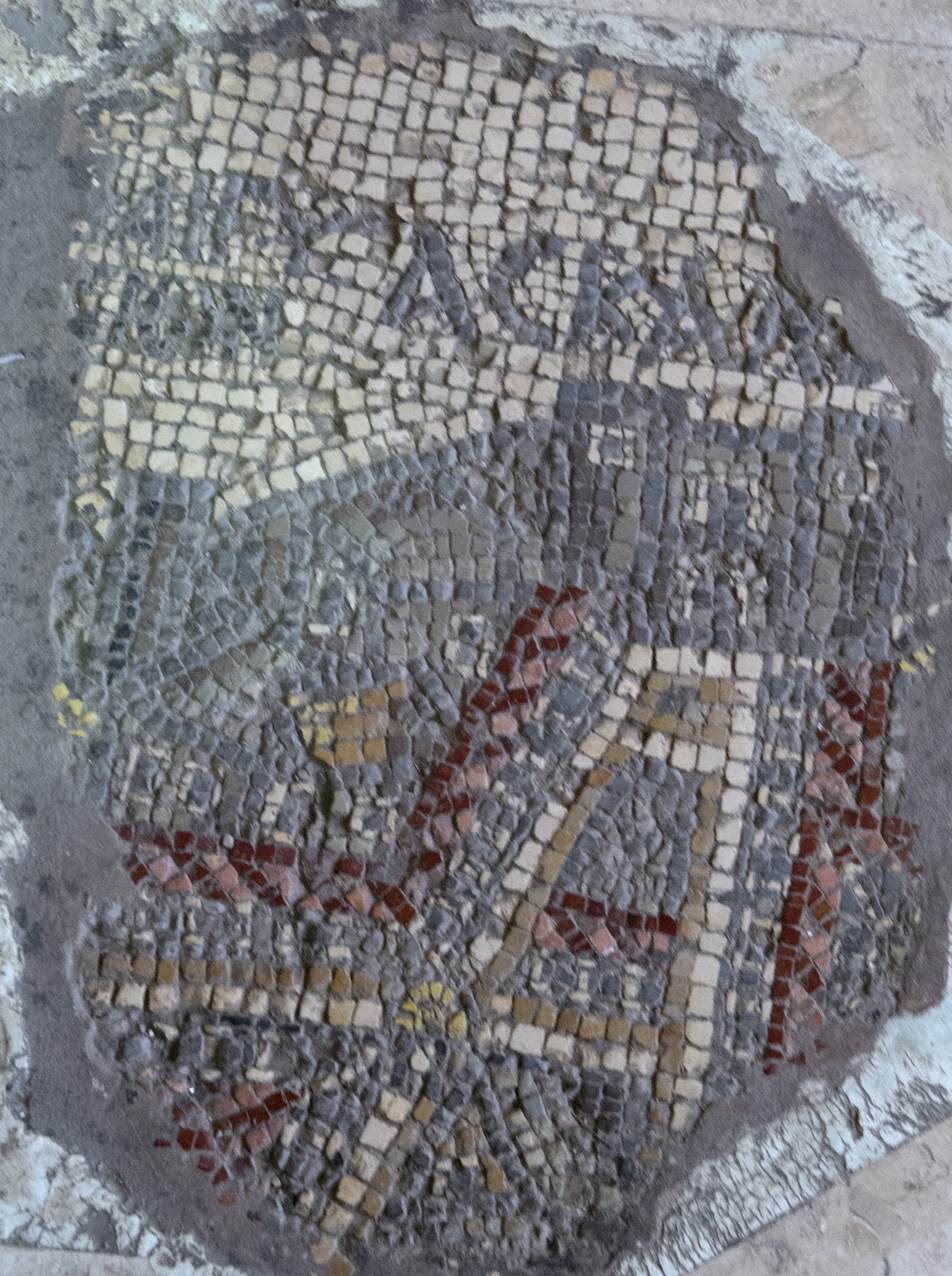
ΑϹΚΑΛ[ⲰΝ] / ASKAL[ŌN] on the Madaba Map

The 4th century CE was the time during which a process of Christianization began in Ascalon. This process was not peaceful, and numerous Christian sources recount the hostilities between pagans and Christians. Eusebius reports that in 311, during the Diocletianic Persecution, residents of Ascalon martyred Egyptian Christians. Hostilities are reported again during the reign of Julian (r. 361–363), who restored paganism in the empire. His stay in Antioch between June 362 and April 363 encouraged his pagan supporters and is marked as time of particular unrest. Ambrose of Milan (339–397) reports that pagans burnt a basilica in Ascalon and the 5th century Christian historian Theodoret recounts atrocities against bishops and women. Archaeological evidence of the hostilities comes from a milestone found north of Ascalon, near a Christian suburb of the city. The milestone is inscribed with both "God is one" and "Be victorious, Julian!". This was interpreted as a part of a propaganda war between Christians and pagans.

Despite the hostilities, by 321, Christianity was already firmly established in Ascalon, with the mentioning of the city's earliest known bishop Longinus. Other bishops of Ascalon whose names are known include Sabinus, who was at the First Council of Nicaea in 325, and his immediate successor, Epiphanius. Auxentius took part in the First Council of Constantinople in 381, Jobinus in a synod held in Lydda in 415, Leontius in both the Robber Council of Ephesus in 449 and the Council of Chalcedon in 451. Bishop Dionysius, who represented Ascalon at a synod in Jerusalem in 536, was on another occasion called upon to pronounce on the validity of a baptism with sand in waterless desert. He sent the person to be baptized in water.

No longer a residential bishopric, Ascalon is today listed by the Catholic Church as a titular see. The city of Ascalon appears on a fragment of the 6th-century Madaba Map.

== Early Islamic period (641–1099) ==
The Muslim conquest of the Levant started in 634. Islamic historian Al-Baladhuri recounts that Ascalon (ʿAsḳalân in Arabic) was one of the last Byzantine cities in the region to fall. It may have been temporarily occupied by Amr ibn al-As, but definitively surrendered after a siege to Mu'awiya I (who later founded the Umayyad Caliphate) not long after he captured the Byzantine district capital of Caesarea in c. 640. Mu'awiya turned the town into a fortified garrison, settling cavalry there. During 'Umar's and 'Uthman's rule (634–644 and 644–656, respectively), tracts of land in Ascalon were awarded to Muslims.

During the Muslim civil war of 680–692 (Second Fitna), the south of Syria came under the military rule of Abd Allah ibn al-Zubayr's caliphate. By that time, the Byzantines reoccupied Asqalan, razed the city and deported its inhabitants. While in the time of Marwan I the region came back to Umayyad hands, the Byzantines either left Ascalon or were forced out only after Marwan's son, Abd al-Malik (r. 685–705) won the civil war. Ascalon enjoyed an era of prosperity after Abd al-Malik rebuilt and fortified it. Despite it not being a good harbor, the city enjoyed its position between Syria and Egypt and their fertile lands. Islamic scholar Yaqut al-Hamawi called it "the Bride of Syria". From the year 712 Ascalon began minting its own copper coins, with the Arabic inscription "Struck in Filastin, Askalan". A son of Caliph Sulayman (r. 715–717), whose family resided in Palestine, was buried in the city.

During the Abbasid period, the power center of the caliphate shifted from Syria to Iraq. An inscription found by Charles Clermont-Ganneau in the 19th century indicates that the Abbasid caliph al-Mahdi ordered the construction of a mosque with a minaret in Asqalan in 772. Towards the end of the 9th century Abbasid rule in Syria dwindled. By 878 it was effectively under the rule of the Tulunids of Egypt, who developed the coastal cities such as Acre, Caesarea Maritima and probably also Ascalon.

In 969, the Fatimid general Jawhar captured Syria and Palestine and annexed the territory to the Fatimid Caliphate of North Africa. Ascalon prospered during the ensuing period. Islamic geographer Al-Maqdisi (945–991) described Ascalon, admiring its spaciousness, pleasant water, plentiful fruit trees that one could eat from freely, full markets around the marble-paved great mosque, strong fortifications and garrison. He also mentions it is renowned for its silkworms, a reference to the sericulture and silk weaving industry there. His only criticism was of the port which he described as "unsafe" and plagued by a pesty fly common to the Mediterranean called the dalam.The Persian scholar Nasir Khusraw had similar praise for the city when he visited Palestine in 1047.

In the 1070s, along with a few other coastal towns in Palestine, it remained in Fatimid hands when most of Syria was conquered by the Seljuks. Fatimid rule over Ascalon was nevertheless loosened, with the governor often exercising a greater latitude of authority over the city than the nominal authority of the Egyptian caliphate.

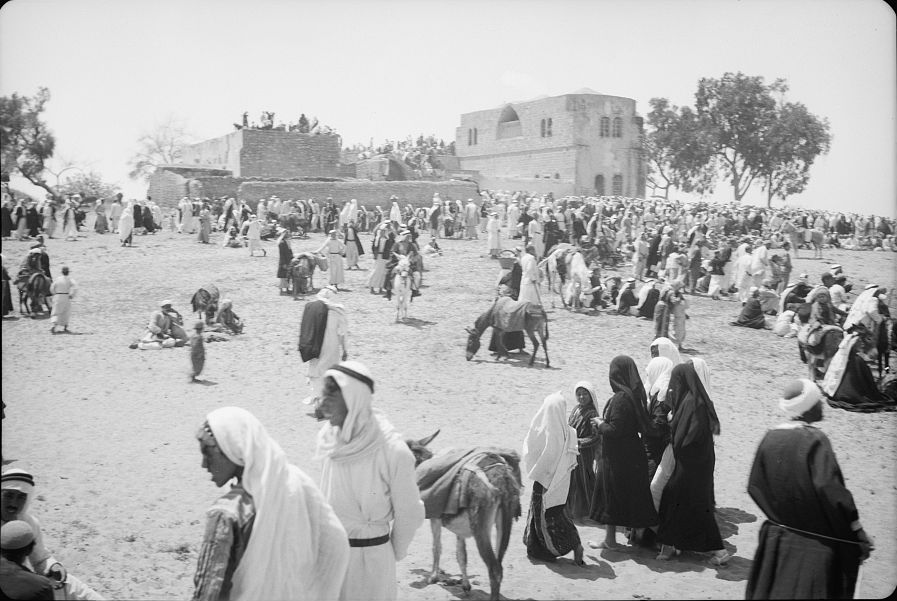
The shrine of Husayn during the annual festival, 1943

In 1091, a couple of years after a campaign by grand vizier Badr al-Jamali to reestablish Fatimid control over the region, the head of Husayn ibn Ali (a grandson of the Islamic prophet Muhammad) was "rediscovered", prompting Badr to order the construction of a new mosque and mashhad (shrine or mausoleum) to hold the relic, known as the Shrine of Husayn's Head. According to another source, the shrine was built in 1098 by the Fatimid vizier al-Afdal Shahanshah.

== Crusader period (1099–1270) ==
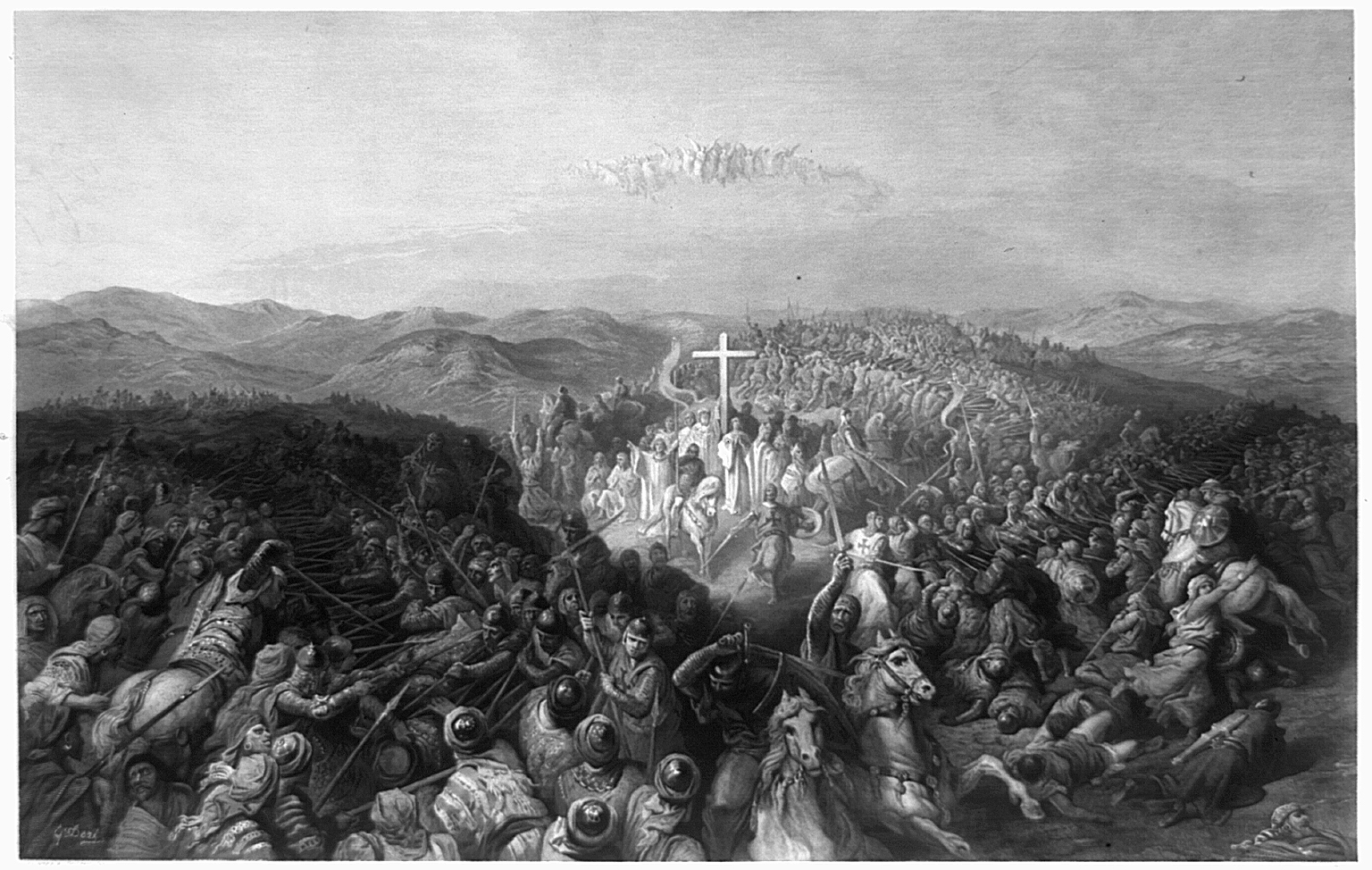
Battle of Ascalon, 1099. Engraving after Gustave Doré

During the Crusades, Ascalon was an important city due to its location near the coast and between the Crusader States and Egypt. It remained the last major Fatimid stronghold for over half a century.

Negotiations over Jerusalem between the Crusaders and the Fatimids, who had recently gained control of the city from the Seljuks, broke down in May 1099 during the final stages of the First Crusade. This led to the siege and eventual capture of Jerusalem on 15 July. The remnants of the Fatimid army retreated to Ascalon. After negotiations ended in May, the Fatimids had begun raising an army at Ascalon, ready to raise the siege of Jerusalem. In August, an army of about 10,000 Crusaders marched on Ascalon to meet the army being raised. They surprised the Fatimids in battle on 12 August just north of the city of Ascalon. While the Crusader army defeated the Fatimid force of around 20,000, the city itself was not captured and remained in Fatimid hands, serving as a base for military activity against the Kingdom of Jerusalem. After the Crusader conquest of Jerusalem in 1099, the six elders of the Karaite Jewish community in Ascalon contributed to the ransoming of captured Jews and holy relics from Jerusalem's new rulers. The Letter of the Karaite elders of Ascalon, which was sent to the Jewish elders of Alexandria, describes their participation in the ransom effort and the ordeals suffered by many of the freed captives.

In 1100, Ascalon was among the Fatimid coastal cities (along with Arsuf, Caesarea and Acre) that paid tribute to the Crusaders, as part of a short truce. In 1101, Caesarea and Arsuf were captured by the Crusaders, and their people fled to Ascalon. To protect the influx of Islamic population, military reinforcements were sent from Egypt, who provided the city with supplies and maintained its garrison. Ascalon thus became a major Fatimid frontier post. It was subjected to a Crusader blockade, often blocking the land route from Egypt, making it only accessible from the sea. The trade between Ascalon and Crusader Jerusalem resumed by that time, though the inhabitants of Ascalon regularly struggled with shortages in food and supplies. This necessitated the provisions from Egypt on several occasions each year. According to William of Tyre, the entire civilian population of the city was included in the Fatimid army registers. Fatimid ruler Al-Hafiz dispatched between 300 and 600 horsemen to protect Ascalon. Each company had 100 troops and was commanded by an emir. A general was put in charge of all companies. They were paid 100 dinars for each emir, and 30 dinars for every horsemen. The Fatimids then used it to launch raids into the Crusaders' Kingdom of Jerusalem.

=== Fatimid–Crusader hostilities (1101–1153) ===
In July 1101, two years after the battle of Ascalon, Fatimid vizier Al-Afdal Shahanshah launched an offensive from Ascalon to recapture Jaffa. By 7 September, Baldwin I defeated the Fatimid troops, and a year later besieged the city, destroying its rural hinterlands. Ascalon was further isolated by the fall of Acre in 1104, but kept serving as a Fatimid base. In August 1105, Al-Afdal launched yet another failed attack from Ascalon, the most serious of his campaigns using both naval and ground forces. The Franks won the land battle and it has been recounted that when they encountered the Fatimid fleet in Jaffa, they threw the head of the defeated governor of Ascalon on board of the Egyptian ships, to inform them of the Crusader victory.

After the Fatimid defeat in 1105, they no longer posed immediate threat to the Crusaders. And yet, Ascalon was deemed impregnable, and its proximities to Egyptian ports made it a primary concern for their Crusader army, as it continued to serve from time to time as base for small-scale incursions. In 1124 Tyre fell to the Crusaders, making Ascalon the last Fatimid stronghold on the Levantine coast. Baldwin II of Jerusalem led an attack against Ascalon in 1125, that was repelled by the Muslims, who continued their incursions.

Trade between the city and Cairo continued seemingly uninterrupted. The list of goods procured by al-Ma'mun al-Bata'ihi, the Fatimid vizier (1122-1126), included textiles of all kinds, heavily worked and plain such as 'Attabi cloth, siglaton, damask, Aleppo silk, and raw and fulled leather, in addition to olive oil and sumac (Rhus coriara), a plant native to Palestine used to flavor many dishes, but also in this case, for tanning leather.

In 1134, the Crusader count of Jaffa, Hugh II, rebelled against King Fulk, who accused him of conspiring against his realm, and of intimate relations with his wife. Hugh II rode to Ascalon to seek help, and the Muslim troops were happy to contribute to the internal feud among the Crusader. Troops left Ascalon to Jaffa and raided the Sharon plain, until Fulk's forces repelled them. Later. A year later, Fatimid vizier Ridwan ibn Walakhshi was appointed governor of Ascalon and the western Nile Delta. Ridwan found refuge in Ascalon during his conflict with Bahram al-Armani in 1138–9.

In the time of Fulk, three fortresses were erected around the city, in order to address the threats it imposed on Jerusalem: Beth Gibelin (1135–6), Ibelin (1140) and Blanchgard (1142). The failure of the Second Crusade and the rise of the Zengid dynasty in Syria motivated Baldwin III of Jerusalem in 1150 to begin preparations to capture Ascalon once and for all. He fortified Gaza, which concerned the Fatimids in Egypt, who requested a pre-emptive strike by the Zengids from the north. These refused, but sent Zengid prince Usama ibn Munqidh, who stayed there for four months and helped reinforce Ascalon's fortifications.

=== Crusader siege and rule (1153–1187) ===
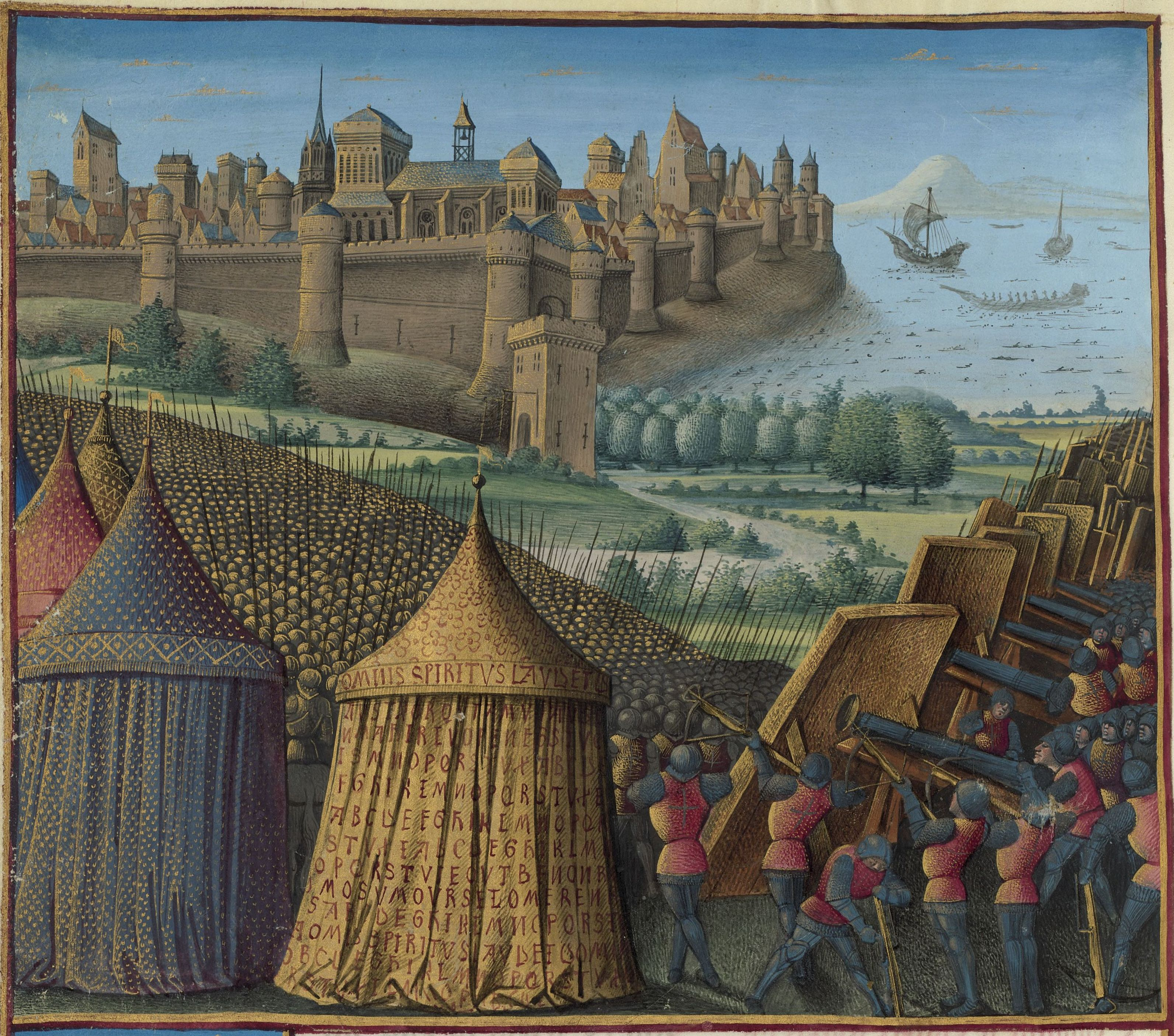
The siege of Ascalon by King Baldwin III of Jerusalem, miniature from Sébastien Mamerot's book "Passages d'outremer" (1474)

In January 1153, crusader king Baldwin III recruited almost all land and naval forces at disposal and laid siege to Ascalon. The siege lasted seven months, during which the city was bombarded by Crusader siege weapons. The Franks found a well prepared city, with strong walls and ample supply of provisions. The Fatimids manage to send over seventy ships with resources to the city during the siege. In his recount of the conquest of Ascalon, William of Tyre described the city from the Crusader point of view:

The whole city lies in a kind of basin which is tilted down toward the sea. It is girded round with artificial mounds on which are walls, studded with towers. It is solidly fashioned and its stones are held together by cement which is as hard as stone. The walls are of a proper thickness and as high as is proportionally fitting. Even the outer fortifications which circle around the city are constructed with the same solidity and are diligently fortified. There are no springs within the circuit of the walls nor are there any nearby, but wells both outside and within the city supply an abundance of delicious drinking water. As a further precaution the citizens have built within the city several cisterns to collect rain water. There are four gates in the circuit of the walls. These are most carefully fortified with high, solid towers.

— William of Tyre, History of Deeds Done Beyond the Sea: XVII, 22–25

Much to the disadvantage of the Muslim garrison in Ascalon, internal conflicts within the Fatimid court and military led to the assassination of Fatimid vizier and general Al-Adil ibn al-Sallar, while preparing the Fatimid fleet for a counterattack. His stepson Abbas ibn Abi al-Futuh who was involved in his murder then went back to Egypt to be appointed a vizier in his stead, leaving Ascalon without his troops. In July 1153, six months after the start of the siege, there was a breach in the wall followed by a failed attack by the Templars. By that point the siege was almost abandoned, but Raymond du Puy convinced the king to resume. On 19 August, Ascalon's anchorage was taken and its defenders were subdued by the Crusaders. Ibn al-Qalanisi recorded that upon the city's surrender, all Muslims with the means to do so emigrated from the city. The Fatimids secured the head of Husayn from its mausoleum outside the city and transported it to their capital Cairo. A year after the conquest, Muslim geographer Muhammad al-Idrisi described the city's markets and fortifications, but also the destrcution of its environs, caused by its siege.

Ascalon became a crusader lordship and was granted to Amalric, the count of Jaffa and Baldwin III's brother, who later succeeded him as king. Together the two formed the County of Jaffa and Ascalon, which became one of the four major seigneuries of the Kingdom of Jerusalem. The great mosque was turned into a church – the Cathedral of St. Paul and the city was turned into a diocese directly under the Patriarch of Jerusalem. Eventually a decision from Rome subordinated it to the Bishop of Bethlehem. The Fatimid dynasty continued to disintegrate due to internal conflicts and could not retake Ascalon.

=== Ayyubid destruction and Third Crusade (1187–1191) ===
Saladin, the founder of the Ayyubid dynasty which abolished the Fatimid state, marched on Ascalon by September 1187, as part of his conquest of the Crusader States following the Battle of Hattin. He took with him the crusader prisoners, King Guy of Lusignan and Templar Grand Master Gerard of Ridefort. The prisoners were promised liberty should the city surrender under their command, but the Christian troops at Ascalon did not obey their captured king's commands. The city surrendered after a brief, yet harsh battle. The Christian population was deported to Alexandria and from there to Europe.

The Ayyubid rule of Ascalon was short-lived. In 1191, during the Third Crusade, Saladin ordered to methodically demolish the city because of its potential strategic importance to the crusaders. This is captured in an anecdote in which a reluctant Saladin is reported to have exclaimed: "Wallah, I would rather see my children perish than lose Ascalon!" The destruction of the city and the deportation of its inhabitants is well described in Islamic sources. Some Muslim scholars including Ibn al-Athir have recounted that the destruction of Ascalon was forced upon him by his emirs. A few hundred Jews, Karaites and Rabbanites, were living in Ascalon in the second half of the 12th century, but moved to Jerusalem following its destruction.

In January 1192, crusade leader King Richard the Lionheart of England, proceeded to reconstruct Ascalon's fortifications, an endeavor that lasted four months. It thus became the most formidable fortress along the Mediterranean coast. This fact hampered the negotiations between Richard and Saladin in 1192, as Saladin demanded its destruction. Eventually, peace was signed in Jaffa and the city's recently constructed fortifications were destroyed yet again by September 1192.

=== Crusader recapture (1229–1247) ===
In 1229, following the Treaty of Jaffa, which concluded the Sixth Crusade, brought Ascalon back to Crusader hands. And yet, because of internal strife among the crusaders, the city remained in ruins until the Ayyubids made it a frontal post to their base in Gaza. In 1239, the Barons' Crusade was launched, led by Theobald I of Navarre who planned an assault on Ayyubid forces in Egypt. He encamped in the ruins of Ascalon, later abandoning it after one of his men, Henry II, disobeyed his orders and led a failed assault on Gaza. The Knights Hospitaller signed a peace agreement with the Ayyubids and Ascalon was given to the Crusaders, who were permitted to reconstruct its fortifications. The work on Ascalon's fortifications was first overseen by Theobald I until his depart to Europe. After him, it was Hugh IV, Duke of Burgundy who replaced him and ultimately, Richard of Cornwall oversaw its completion in April 1241, again becoming one of the strongest strongholds in the Mediterranean, with a double wall and series of towers. In a letter, Richard described Ascalon as the "key" to both land and sea, and as a permanent threat to Egypt.

During Sultan As-Salih Ayyub's conflict against the crusaders, he exploited crusader defeats in Jerusalem to march on Ascalon. In 1244, the Egyptian army headed by Baybars, defeated the Hospitaller troops at Gaza and blockaded Ascalon. The city's garrison managed to hold against the Egyptian troops. In June 1247, after capturing Damascus, the Egyptians dedicated all of the military efforts to Ascalon, and the city fell on 15 October 1247, after an assault headed by Fakhr al-Din ibn al-Shaykh. Afterwards, As-Salih Ayyub ordered again the dismantling of the walls.

== Mamluk Sultanate (1270-1517), the end of Ascalon and beginning of Majdal Asqalan ==
The ancient and medieval history of the city of Ascalon was brought to an end in 1270, when the Mamluk sultan Baybars ordered the citadel and harbour to be destroyed as part of a wider decision to raze the Levantine coastal towns in order to forestall future Crusader invasions. Some buildings with special significance from Ascalon, like the shrine of Sittna Khadra ( Maqam al-Khadra) and the Shrine of Husayn's Head, were left standing. This event irreversibly changed the settlement patterns in the region. As a substitute for 'Asqalān, Baybars established Majdal 'Asqalān, 3 km inland, and endowed it with a magnificent Friday mosque, a marketplace and religious shrines.

Still, subsequent travellers to the region continued to recall the city. Dimashqi mentions Asqalan (Ascalon) in his writings in 1300, noting that it was at times considered part of the Kingdom of Damascus and at other times, part of the Kingdom of Gaza|Kingdom of Ghazzah (Gaza), but that after it was retaken from the Franks, it was destroyed by the Muslims. Abulfeda also recalls the city in his 14th century records writing: "'Askalan, in Filastin, is a town where there are ancient remains. It lies on the sea coast. Between it and Ghazzah the distance is about three leagues. It is one of the fortresses of Islam in Syria. Muhallabi says 'Askalan stands by the seashore on an elevation, and is one of the finest of the coast towns. It has no harbour. Its inhabitants drink well-water, which is sweet (not brackish). Between it and Ghazzah the distance is 10 miles, and between it and Ar Ramlah 18 miles. At the present day it is in ruins, and there are no inhabitants."

== Ottoman period (1516–1917) ==
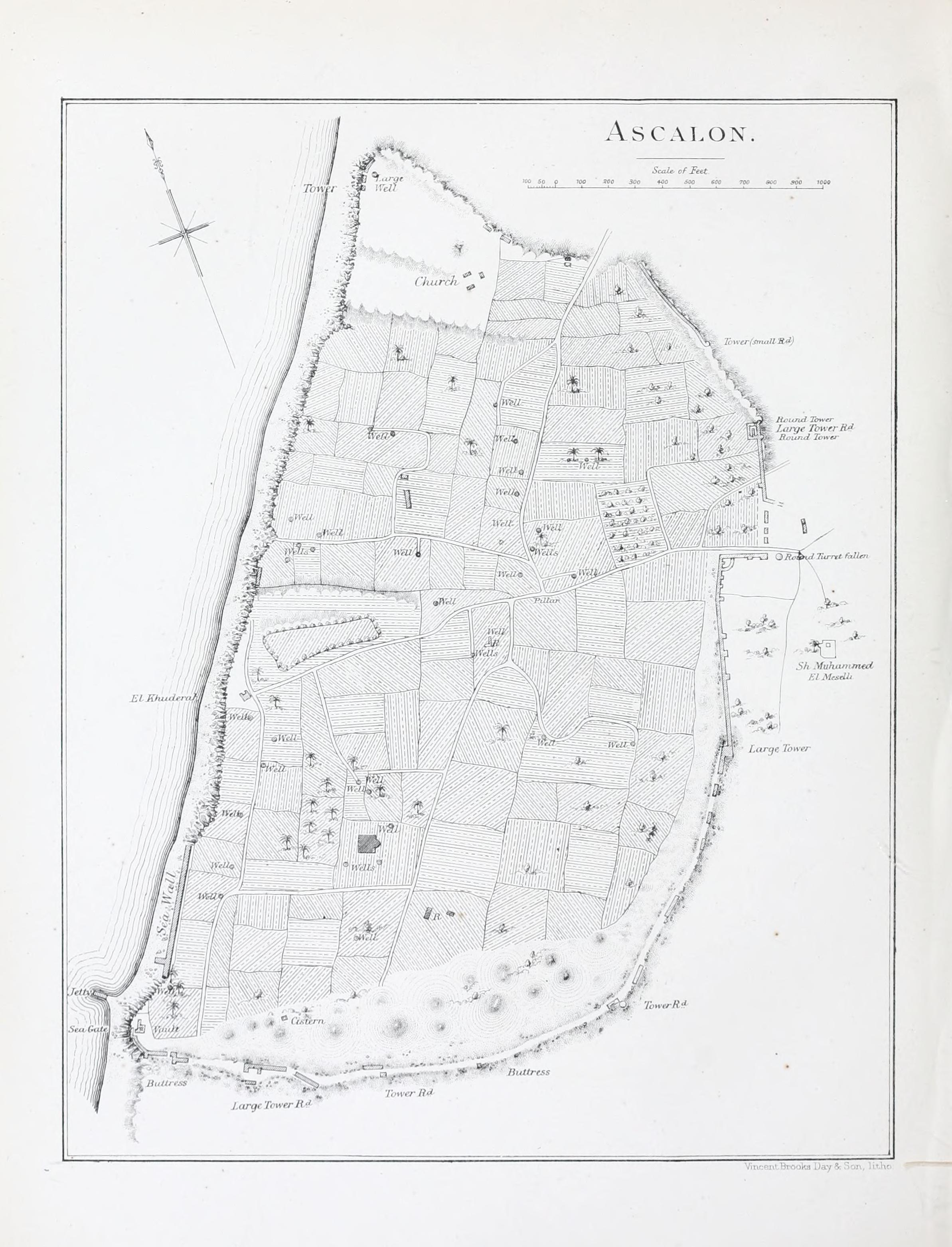
Map of the ruins of the ancient city, from the 1871–77 PEF Survey of Palestine

In the first Ottoman tax register of 1526/7, the name Ascalon (as Asqalān) is still remembered as a site, but it is no longer present by the time of the 1596 census. Al-Majdal is mentioned in both as having 187 households (+6, which refers to the number of bachelors, every 4 counted as one household, so +6 = 24 individuals) in 1537, and then 559 households in 1596. By way of comparison, this is twice the population of Ramla at the time, and Majdal was serving as a regional center in lieu of Ascalon.

Other surrounding villages in the area appear in the 1596 census too, some for the first time, like Al-Jura, then named as Jawrat al-Hajja, was founded just outside the northeastern perimeter of Ascalon's still mounded ramparts. The growth of other villages, like Bayt Daras and Hamama, is also apparent. The transition from Mamluk to Ottoman rule changed the administrative landscape but had little effect on the local population's patterns of daily of life.

An official Ottoman census list from about 1870 lists Majdal Asqalan as Medschdel, noting it had a total of 420 households and a population of 1175, though the population count included men only.

== Archaeology ==
Beginning in the 18th century, the site was visited, and occasionally drawn, by a number of adventurers and tourists. It was also often scavenged for building materials. The first known excavation occurred in 1815. Lady Hester Stanhope dug there for two weeks using 150 workers. No real records were kept. In the 1800s some classical pieces from Ascalon (though long thought to be from Thessaloniki) were sent to the Ottoman Museum. By the time of the commissioning of the PEF Survey of Palestine in 1871–77, the interior of Ascalon's ruined perimeter was divided into cultivated fields, interspersed with wells. From 1920 to 1922, John Garstang and W. J. Phythian-Adams excavated on behalf of the Palestine Exploration Fund. They focused on two areas, one Roman and the other Philistine/Canaanite. Over the more recent decades a number of salvage excavations were carried out by the Israel Antiquities Authority (IAA).

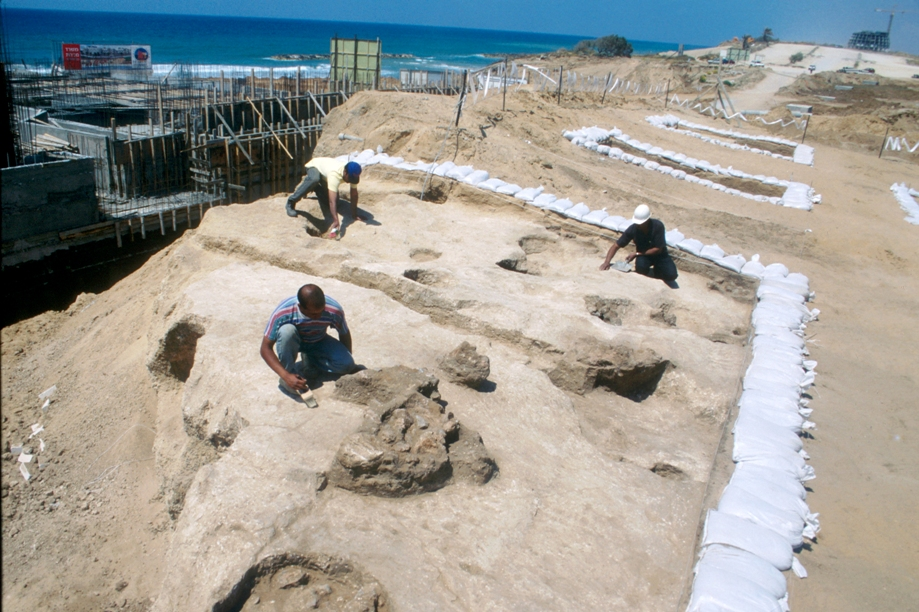
Archaeological site with artifacts from the Neolithic era

Modern excavation began in 1985 with the Leon Levy Expedition. Between then and 2006, seventeen seasons of work took place, led by Lawrence Stager of Harvard University. In 1991 the ruins of a small ceramic tabernacle was found, containing a finely cast bronze statuette of a bull calf, originally silvered, ten centimetres (4 in) long. In the 1997 season a cuneiform table fragment was found, being a lexical list containing both Sumerian and Canaanite language columns. It was found in a Late Bronze Age II context, about 13th century BCE.

== Legacy ==
William Albright said of the city: "Ascalon is a name to conjure with. Few cities in the Old World had a more romantic history than this, from the time when its fleets according to Greek tradition, held the thalassocracy of the eastern Mediterranean to its romantic destruction by its own suzerain, Saladin, who thus avoided its impending capture by the Lion Heart."

The scallion and shallot are both types of onion named after ancient Ascalon. The name "scallion" is derived from the Old French escaloigne, by way of the Vulgar Latin escalonia, from the Latin Ascalōnia caepa or onion of Ascalon. "Shallot" is also derived from escaloigne, but by way of the 1660s diminutive form eschalotte.

The derivative "Im schwarzen Walfisch zu Askalon" (In the Black Whale of Ascalon) is a German commercium song historically sung in German universities. Joseph Victor von Scheffel provided the lyrics under the title Altassyrisch (Old Assyrian) in 1854, while the melody is from 1783 or earlier.

== Notable people ==
Chronologically by death year:

- Antiochus of Ascalon (125–68 BCE), Platonic philosopher
- Artemidorus of Ascalon (d. 46 BCE), Hellenistic philosopher
- Aristus of Ascalon (c. 120/110–46/45 BCE), Hellenistic philosopher, brother of Antiochus
- Ptolemy of Ascalon (1st century BCE), late Hellenistic grammarian
- Eutocius of Ascalon (c. 480s – c. 520s), Byzantine philosopher
- Al-Hafiz (c. 1075–1149), Fatimid caliph

== Sources ==
- Boehm, R. (2015). "A Donation Inscription and Monument from Late Antique Ashkelon". Zeitschrift für Papyrologie und Epigraphik. 194: 161–168. JSTOR 43909727. Archived from the original on 2024-07-26.
- Boehm, R.; Master, D. M.; Le Blanc, R. (2016). "The Basilica, Bouleuterion, and Civic Center of Ashkelon". American Journal of Archaeology. 120 (2): 271–324. doi:10.3764/aja.120.2.0271. JSTOR 10.3764/aja.120.2.0271. Archived from the original on 2023-02-13.
- Burke, Aaron A. (2008). Walled Up to Heaven: The Evolution of Middle Bronze Age Fortification Strategies in the Levant. Winona Lake, Indiana: Eisenbrauns. ISBN 978-1-57506-927-2.
- Garfinkel, Yosef; Dag, Doron (2008). Neolithic Ashkelon. Qedem. Vol. 47. Institute of Archaeology, Hebrew University of Jerusalem. pp. III–329. JSTOR 43588822.
- Fuks, G. (2001). A City of Many Seas: Ashkelon During the Hellenistic and Roman Periods (in Hebrew). Jerusalem: Yad Yitzhak Ben-Zvi.
- Hartmann, R. & Lewis, B. (1960). "Askalan". In Gibb, H. A. R.; Kramers, J. H.; Lévi-Provençal, E.; Schacht, J.; Lewis, B. & Pellat, Ch. (eds.). The Encyclopaedia of Islam, Second Edition. Volume I: A–B. Leiden: E. J. Brill. pp. 710–711. OCLC 495469456.
- Hoffman, T (2019). Ashkelon 8: The Islamic and Crusader Periods. Penn State University. ISBN 978-1-57506-735-3.
- Huster, Y. (2015). Ashkelon 5: The Land behind Ashkelon. Penn State University. ISBN 978-1-57506-952-4.
- Johnson, B. L. (2008). Stager, L. E.; Schloen, J. D. (eds.). Ashkelon 2: Imported Pottery of the Roman and Late Roman Periods. Penn State University. ISBN 978-1-57506-930-2. Archived from the original on 2024-07-26.
- Koch, I (2021). Colonial Encounters in Southwest Canaan during the Late Bronze Age and the Early Iron Age. Leiden, Boston: Brill. ISBN 978-90-04-43283-3. Archived from the original on 2024-07-06.
- Lecker, Michael (1989). "The Estates of 'Amr b. al-'Āṣ in Palestine: Notes on a New Negev Arabic Inscription". Bulletin of the School of Oriental and African Studies, University of London. 52 (1): 24–37. doi:10.1017/S0041977X00023041. JSTOR 617911. S2CID 163092638.
- Le Strange, Guy (1890). Palestine Under the Moslems: A Description of Syria and the Holy Land from A.D. 650 to 1500. London: Committee of the Palestine Exploration Fund. OCLC 1004386.
- Morez Jacobs, Adeline; Irish, Joel D.; Cooke, Ashley; Anastasiadou, Kyriaki; Barrington, Christopher; Gilardet, Alexandre; Kelly, Monica; Silva, Marina; Speidel, Leo; Tait, Frankie; Williams, Mia; Brucato, Nicolas; Ricaut, Francois-Xavier; Wilkinson, Caroline; Madgwick, Richard; Holt, Emily; Nederbragt, Alexandra J.; Inglis, Edward; Hajdinjak, Mateja; Skoglund, Pontus; Girdland-Flink, Linus (2 July 2025). "Whole-genome ancestry of an Old Kingdom Egyptian". Nature. 644 (8077): 4, Fig.3a. Bibcode:2025Natur.644..714M. doi:10.1038/s41586-025-09195-5. ISSN 1476-4687. PMC 12367555. PMID 40604286.
- Morris, E. F. (2005). The Architecture of Imperialism: Military Bases and the Evolution of Foreign Policy in Egypt's New Kingdom. Leiden, Boston: Brill. ISBN 90-04-14036-0.
- Petersen, A. (2017). "Shrine of Husayn's Head". Bones of Contention: Muslim Shrines in Palestine. Heritage Studies in the Muslim World. Springer Singapore. ISBN 978-981-10-6965-9.
- Press, M. D. (2012). Ashkelon 4: The Iron Age Figurines of Ashkelon and Philistia. Penn State University. ISBN 978-1-57506-942-5.
- Petersen, Andrew (2001). A Gazetteer of Buildings in Muslim Palestine (British Academy Monographs in Archaeology). Vol. 1. Oxford University Press. pp. 210-213. ISBN 978-0-19-727011-0. Archived from the original on 28 May 2021.
- Sharon, M. (1995). "A New Fâṭimid Inscription from Ascalon and Its Historical Setting". 'Atiqot. 26: 61–86. JSTOR 23457057.
- Stager, L. E. (1996). "Ashkelon and the Archaeology of Destruction: Kislev 604 BCE". Eretz-Israel: Archaeological, Historical and Geographical Studies. 25: 61*–74*. JSTOR 23629693. Archived from the original on 2024-07-23.
- Stager, L. E. (2011). "Egyptian Pottery in Middle Bronze Age Ashkelon". Eretz-Israel: Archaeological, Historical and Geographical Studies. 30: 119*–126*. JSTOR 23631007.
- Stager, L. E.; Master, D. M.; Aja, A. J. (2020). Ashkelon 7: The Iron Age I. Penn State University. ISBN 978-1-64602-090-4.
- Stager, L. E.; Master, D. M.; Schloen, J. D., eds. (2011). Ashkelon 3: The Seventh Century B.C. Penn State University. ISBN 978-1-57506-939-5.
- Stager, L. E.; Schloen, J. D.; Master, D. M., eds. (2008). Ashkelon 1: Introduction and Overview (1985–2006). Penn State University. ISBN 978-1-57506-929-6. Archived from the original on 2024-07-27.
- Stager, L. E.; Schloen, J. D.; Voss, R. J. (2018). Ashkelon 6: The Middle Bronze Age Ramparts and Gates of the North Slope and Later Fortifications. Penn State University. ISBN 978-1-57506-980-7.
- Al-Baladhuri (1912). Kitāb Futūḥ al-Buldān [The Origins of the Islamic State]. Translated by Hitti, P. K. Columbia University.
