= Sidqa =

King of Ashkelon in the 8th century BCE

Ṣidqa (Philistine: 𐤑𐤃𐤒𐤀 *Ṣīdqāʾ; Akkadian: Neo-Assyrian Akkadian: 𒁹𒍢𒀉𒋡𒀀, romanized: Ṣidqâ) was a king of Ascalon in the 8th century BC. He, much like Hezekiah, king of the neighboring Kingdom of Judah, rebelled against the Assyrian king Sennacherib. Sennacherib eventually put the rebellion down, and by 701 BC had destroyed the cities of Beth-Dagon, Joppa, Banai-Barqa, and Azjuru. Sidqa was forced to pay tribute following his defeat. After the revolt, Sennacherib placed Šarru-lu-dari, the son of Sidqa's predecessor, Rukibtu, on the throne of Ascalon. Despite this, Šarru-lu-dari was apparently succeeded by Sidqa's son, Mitinti.

Preceded by Rukibtu	King of Ashkelon ? BCE - 701 BCE	Succeeded by Šarru-lu-dari
