= Letter of the Karaite elders of Ascalon =

C. 1100 letter describing the rule of Jerusalem by Crusaders

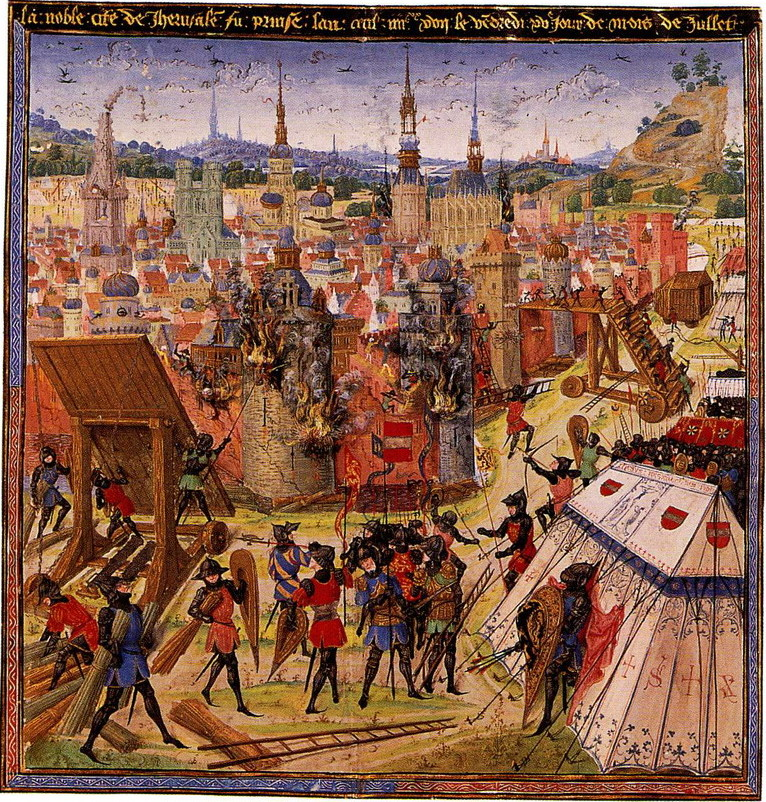
The siege of Jerusalem in 1099.

The Letter of the Karaite elders of Ascalon (c. 1100) was a communication written by six elders of the Karaite Jewish community of Ascalon and sent to their coreligionists in Alexandria nine months after the fall of Jerusalem during the First Crusade. The contents describe how the Ascalon elders pooled money to pay the initial ransom for pockets of Jews and holy relics being held captive in Jerusalem by the Crusaders, the fate of some of these refugees after their release (including their transport to Alexandria, contraction of the plague, or death at sea), and the need for additional funds for the rescuing of further captives. It was written in a variety of Judeo-Arabic, which are Jewish Arabic ethnolects written using the Hebrew alphabet.

This and other such letters related to the Crusader conquest of Jerusalem were discovered by noted historian S.D. Goitein in 1952 among the papers of the Cairo Geniza. Goitein first published his findings in Zion, a Hebrew journal, and then presented a partial English translation of the letter in the Journal of Jewish Studies that same year. Since then, it has been retranslated in several other books pertaining to the Crusades. Goitein's final and most complete English translation appeared in his final book posthumously published in 1988.

== Text ==
We thank the Most High who gave us the opportunity of fulfilling this pious deed, and granted to you to take a share in it with us. We spent the money for the ransom of some of the captives, after due consideration of the instructions contained in your letter, that is, we send what was available to those who [had already been ransomed(?)].

We did not fail to reply to what you had written us, and indeed we answered, but we were seeking a man who would bring our reply to you. Afterwards it happened that these illnesses came upon us—plague, pestilence, and leprosy—which filled our minds with anxiety, that we ourselves or some of our relatives might be stricken with disease. A man whom we trust went from here and must have explained to you the position with respect to the sums you had sent: that they reached us safely and that they were spent in the manner indicated [in your letter].

News still reaches us that among those who were redeemed from the Franks and remained in Ascalon, some are in danger of dying of want. Others remained in captivity, and yet others were killed before the eyes of the rest, who themselves were killed afterwards with all manner of tortures; [for the enemy murdered them] in order to give vent to his anger on them. We did not hear of a single man of Israel who was in such plight without exerting ourselves to do all that was in our power to save him.

The Most High has granted opportunities of relief and deliverance to individual fugitives, of which the first and most perfect instance—after the compassion of Heaven—has been the presence in Ascalon of the honourable shaykh 'Abu' I-Fadl Sahl son of Yusha' son of Shay'a (may God preserve him), an agent of the Sultan (may God bestow glory upon his victories), whose influence is great in Alexandria where his word is very much heeded. He arranged matters wisely and took great pain in securing the ransom; but it would require a lengthy discourse to explain how he did it. But he could only ransom some of the people and had to leave the others. In the end, all those who could be ransomed from them [the Franks] were liberated, and only a few whom they kept remained in their hands, including a boy of about eight years of age, and a man, known as [?] the son of the Tustari's wife. It is reported that the Franks urged the latter to embrace the Christian faith of his own free will and promised to treat him well, but he told them, how could he become a Christian priest and be left in peace by them [the Jews], who had disbursed on his behalf a great sum. Until this day these captives remain in their [Franks'] hands; as well as those who were taken to Antioch, but these are few, and not counting those who abjured their faith because they lost patience as it was not possible to ransom them, and because they despaired of being permitted to go free.

We were not informed, praise be to the Most High, that the accursed ones who are called 'Ashkenazim (Germans) violated or raped women, as did the others.

Now, among those who have reached safety are some who escaped on the second and third days following the battle and left with the governor who was granted safe conduct; and others who, after having been caught by the Franks, remained in their hands for some time and escaped in the end; these are but few. The majority consists of those who were ransomed. To our sorrow, some of them ended their lives under all kinds of suffering and affliction. The privations which they had to endure caused some of them to leave for this country without food or protection against the cold, and they died on the way. Others in a similar way perished at sea; and yet others, after having arrived here safely, became exposed to a "change of air"; they came at the height of the plague, and a number of them died. We had, at the time, reported the arrival of each group.

And when the aforementioned honoured shaykh arrived, he brought a group of them, i.e., the bulk of those who had reached Ascalon; he spent the Sabbath and celebrated Passover with them on the way in the manner as is required by such circumstances. He contracted a private loan for the sum that he had to pay the camel drivers and for their maintenance on the way, as well as the caravan guards and for other expenses, after having already spent other sums of money, which he did not charge to the community. All this is in addition to the money that was borrowed and spent in order to buy back two hundred and thirty volumes, a hundred codices, and eight Torah Scrolls. All these are communal property and are now in Ascalon.

The community, after having disbursed about five hundred dinars for the actual ransom of the individuals, for maintenance of some of them and for the ransom, as mentioned above, of the sacred books, remained indebted for the sum of two hundred dinars. This is in addition to what has been spent on behalf of those who have been arriving from the beginning until now, on water and other drinks, medical treatment, maintenance and, in so far as possible, clothing. If it could be calculated how much this has cost over such a long period, the sum would indeed be great.

Had the accepted practice been followed, that is, of selling three Jewish captives for a hundred [dinars], the whole available sum would have been spent for the ransom of only a few. However, the grace of the Lord, may His name be exalted, and His ever-ready mercy, has been bestowed upon these wretched people, the oppressed, the captives, the poor and indigent, who may, indeed, groan, lament, and cry out as it is written [Ps. xliv, 12-13]: "Thou hast given us like sheep appointed for meat, and hast scattered us among the heathen. Thou sellest Thy people for nought and dost not increase Thy wealth by their price." And we ourselves may say [Is. i, 9]: "Except the Lord of Hosts had left unto us a very small remnant, we should have been as Sodom, and we should have been like unto Gomorrah."

We declare that all the silver which we have weighed [i.e., the money we have spent] in this catastrophe, from the beginning until now is but light and insignificant in relation to its magnitude and the greatness of the sorrow it has entailed.

Some adduce as an excuse the impoverishment of this class of financial magnates and property holders and the harshness of the winter season, and enfeebled it.

We could not refrain ourselves from reporting what we know and the outcome of what we have done in this juncture, for we are convinced that you, just like ourselves, regret and mourn for those who have died and strive for the preservation of those who are alive; especially since your determination to distinguish yourselves was clearly shown and the loftiness of your aspiration and generosity became apparent. You were the first and the most consistent in the fulfilment of this "good deed" which you were granted to perform, and which gained for you great superiority over the other communities as well as much honour.

We dispatched a messenger to you and what he will tell you about the details of this misfortune exempts us from discoursing on it at greater length. We beg of you, may God preserve you in long life, to deal with him kindly until he returns; and concerning that which God may cause him [to collect] amongst you—may God preserve you—if you could write out for him a bill of exchange it would make things easier for him, since he is but a messenger, and speed up his return. If this cannot be done, arrange that an exact statement of how much has been collected be made, and have your letter sent through him [the messenger] and mention the sum in it. The God of Israel, etc....

(There follow nine lines with complimentary phrases in Hebrew.)

(In the margin) [I] The writer of the above, the pained, sorrowful, and grieving Yesha'ya ha-Kohen b. Masliah the Enlightened sends respectful greetings to all the gentlemen, and begs them to accept his apology. They are not unaware of what he has gone through from the time he took leave of them until this day. (To the left of preceding lines) David b. R. Shelomo b. R.... sends his greeting to your excellencies and begs you to note ... al-Fadl Abu.... PTo the right of the first signature, in Arabic characters} Hanina b. Mansur b. 'Ubayd (peace be on him) reserves for the venerable lords and masters, may God preserve their excellencies, the best greeting and most excellent salutation and attention; expresses his longing for them and begs them to take note of the contents of this letter. Peace.

== See also ==
- Aleppo Codex
- Battle of Ascalon
- Crusades
- Siege of Ascalon
