= Vincent Placcius =

German writer

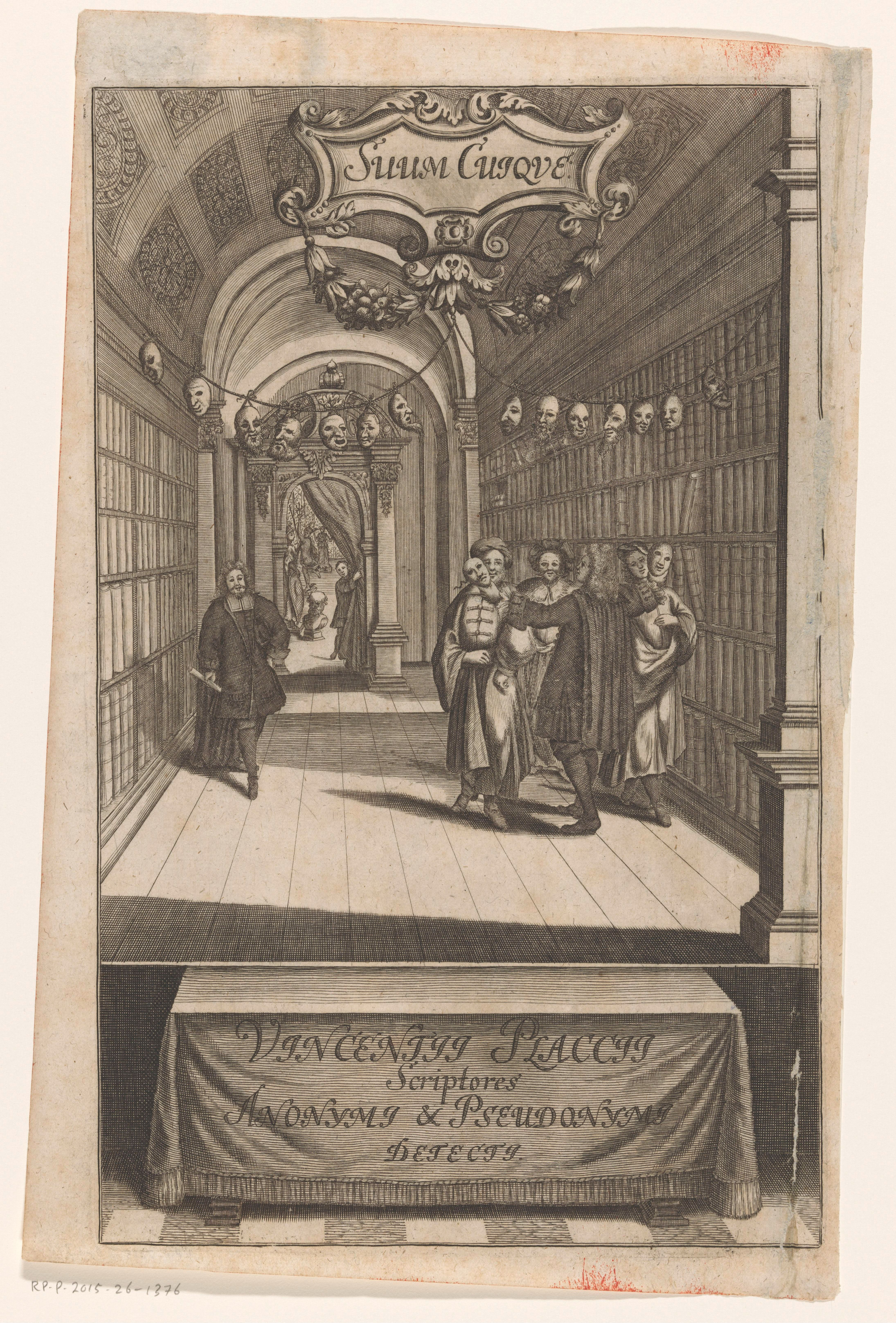
- Vincent Placcius. Theatrum Anonymorum et Pseudonynorum. Hamburg: weduwe Gottfried Liebernickel, 1708.
- Born: 1642; Hamburg
- Died: 1699 (aged 56–57)
- Occupations: Writer, professor, jurist and polymath

Vincent Placcius (1642–1699) was a German writer, professor, jurist and polymath.

== Life ==
He was born in 1642 and died in 1699.

He was a professor of morals and eloquence for twenty-four years.

== Works ==
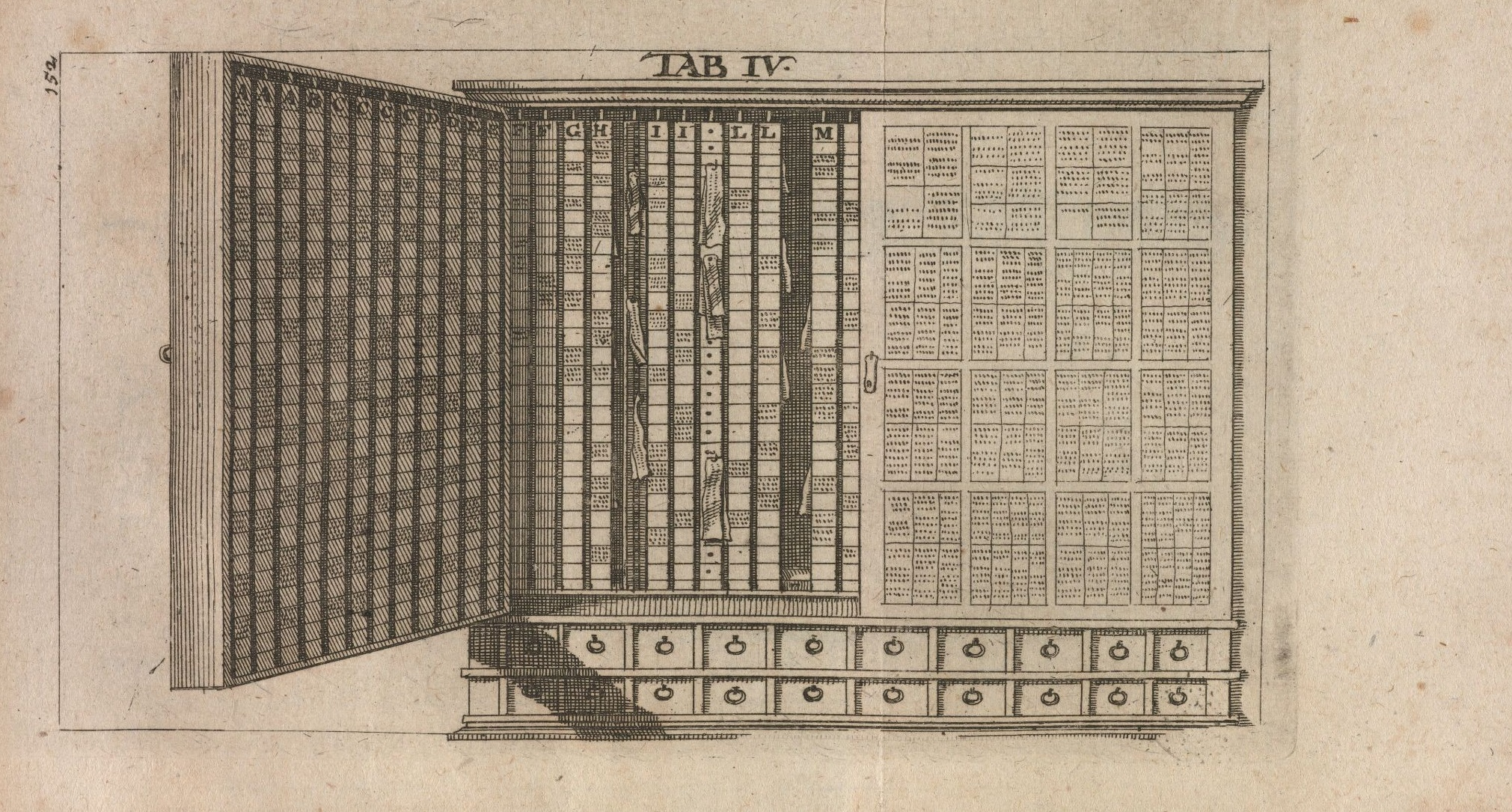
Illustration from De arte excerpendi ("Art of Excerpting"), 1689

He is chiefly remembered for his work De arte excerpendi (The Art of Excerpting) which modern day commentators have suggested that it was a precursor to the computer hard disk.

Several of his works have been auctioned for large sums by Christie's.

== Excerpts ==
John Gorton's General Biographical Dictionary provides the following information about Vincent Placcius:

Vincent Placcius, a learned jurist, was born at Hamburg in 1642. He studied at Helmstadt, and after travelling in France and Italy, he returned to his native city, where he practiced at the bar, and was appointed professor of morals and eloquence, which post he held until his death in 1699. His principal work is a curious bibliographical piece respecting anonymous and pseudonymous writers, entitled "De Scriptis et Scriptoribus anonymis atque pseudonymis Syntagma".

Alexander Chalmers' General Biographical Dictionary provides the following information about Vincent Placcius:

Vincent Placcius was an eminent philologer of Hamburgh, where he was born in 1642, completed his studies at Helmstadt and Leipzig, and improved his talents by travelling in France and Italy. When he returned, he applied himself to the bar, and afterwards became professor of morals and eloquence, in which situation he continued twenty-four years. He was beloved by his pupils, and when he died, April 6, 1699, regretted by his countrymen in general, who had considered him as an oracle. His works are, 1. “A Dictionary of anonymous and pseudonymous Authors,” published in 1708, in 2 vols. folio, by the care of Fabricius a curious work, but abounding with faults, 2. “De jurisconsulto perito Liber,” 1693, 8vo. 3. “Carmina juvenilia,” Amst. 1667, 12mo. 4. “De arte excerpendi,” Hamburgh, 1689, 8vo, with several others, all testifying, and abundantly proving, his talents and erudition.
