= Rukibtu =

King of Ashkelon in the 8th century BC

Rukibtu (Akkadian: 𒊒𒌑𒄒𒌅 𒌉 ru-ú-kib-tu) or Rukibti (Akkadian: 𒊒𒄒𒋾 ru-kib-ti) was a king of Ascalon in the 8th century BC, when Philistia was a dependency of the Neo-Assyrian Empire. After his predecessor Mitinti I instigated an unsuccessful rebellion against the emperor Tiglath-Pileser III in Ashkelon, Rukibtu deposed him and usurped the throne for himself. Tiglath-Pileser III's annals call him "Rukibtu, son of [...]" - the name of his father has not survived. Some scholars have suggested that his father was Mitinti I, however, kings of ignoble origins were often called "son of a nobody" in Assyrian and Babylonian sources, and with Rukibtu having usurped the throne, this possibility cannot be ruled out.

Rukibtu died sometime between the reigns of Shalmaneser V and Sargon II. He was succeeded by Sidqa, who also instigated a failed revolt against Assyrian authority. Sennacherib then deposed Sidqa, and placed Rukibtu's son Šarru-lu-dari on the throne of Ashkelon.

Preceded by Mitinti I	King of Ashkelon c. 732 BCE - ? BCE	Succeeded by Sidqa
