= Šarru-lu-dari =

Šarru-lu-dari (Neo-Assyrian Akkadian: 𒁹𒈗𒇻𒆕𒊑, romanized: Šar-lu-dà-ri), meaning "May the king be everlasting") was a king of Ascalon during the reign of the Neo-Assyrian emperors Sennacherib, Esarhaddon, and Ashurbanipal. His father was named Rukibtu, who ruled Ascalon before Šarru-lu-dari's predecessor, the rebellious king Sidqa. Though he was implicitly a Philistine, his name is uniquely Assyrian.

== Sennacherib's reign ==
During Sennacherib's reign, the Levant suffered multiple rebellions against Assyrian rule. Sidqa had incited rebellion in Ascalon, alongside the nobles of Ekron and Hezekiah of Judah. Ultimately, Sidqa was defeated after the Assyrians sacked Joppa and the surrounding cities in 701 BC. Following this, Sennacherib removed Sidqa from the throne, and replaced him with Šarru-lu-dari. Šarru-lu-dari was then forced to pay tribute to Sennacherib, as was the standard procedure in Assyria.

"[I set] Šarru-lū-dāri, [son of Rūkibtu], their for[mer] king, over the people of the city Ashke[lon and] imposed upon him the payment of tribute (and) gift[s (in recognition) of my overlordship] so that he (now) pul[ls my yoke]."

== Esarhaddon ==
During the reign of Sennacherib's son, Esarhaddon, Šarru-lu-dari is mentioned alongside the pharaoh Necho I in several highly fragmented correspondences.

During the reign of Esarhaddon, Mitinti, the son of Sidqa, seemingly replaces Šarru-lu-dari as king of Ascalon. How and why this happened is not entirely clear, though given that Šarru-lu-dari was apparently collaborating with Necho I and is described as the governor of Pelusium during the reign of Ashurbanipal, it is possible that he was "reassigned" by Esarhaddon for whatever reason. As for why Mitinti, son of Sidqa, was his replacement, it is possible Esarhaddon placed Mitinti on the throne because he was the son of the previous king, just as his father Sennacherib had placed Šarru-lu-dari on the throne for the same reasons, but the matter of Sidqa's rebellion raises questions as to why his son would have been allowed to ascend the throne. It is also possible that Sidqa and Mitinti were close relatives of Rukibtu and Šarru-lu-dari, as there are no (surviving) indications that Sidqa had usurped the throne from Rukibtu.

== Ashurbanipal ==
During the reign of Esarhaddon's son Ashurbanipal, there was some sort of a rebellion in Egypt involving the Nubian king Taharqa. Šarru-lu-dari is listed among the Assyrian-appointed governors or client kings of Egypt, and was involved in this rebellion. Yet, at some point, Ashurbanipal pardoned both Necho and Šarru-lū-dāri, as well as other Egyptian kings,

"[(As for) Ne]cho, [king of the cities Memphis and Sais, Šarru-l]ū-dāri, [king of the city Pelusium, Pi-ša]n-Ḫuru, [king of the city Natho, Pa]-qruru, king of [the city (Pi)šaptu, (ii 5´´) In]aros ([Ni]ḫerau), king of the city [Athribis, (and) N]aḫkê, king of the city He[racleopolis], those [kings], governors, (and) [officials whom the father who had engendered me] had appointed [in] Egypt, (ii 10´´) [who] had abandoned [their post(s) in the face of Taharqa’s] tactical adva[nce, (and) had gone to (lit. “filled”) the countryside], where [their post(s) were, I permitted them to serve in their (former) positions again."

After that, Ashurbanipal returned to Babylon.

Yet, later on, Necho, Šarru-lū-dāri, and Pa-qruru got into trouble again, and fled their posts during another attempted conquest of Egypt by Taharqa. Šarru-lū-dāri then controlled the city of Ṣinu, another name for Pelusium. Afterwards, he, Necho, and Pa-qruru apparently tried to enter into a treaty with Taharqa to split up the conquered lands amidst themselves. Ashurbanipal heard about this after some messengers were intercepted, and saw it as treason.

In response, his governors and eunuchs captured Necho and Šarru-lu-dari, and brought them to Nineveh, while the supporters of Taharqa in the cities Sais, Mendes, and Pelusium, "as many as had sided with them [the rebels] and plotted evil (deeds)" were severely punished.

"Afterwards, Necho, Šarru-lū-dāri, (and) Pa-[qruru] sinned against my treaty (and) did not honor the oath(s sworn) by [the great gods]."

The two of them, Necho, and Šarru-lū-dāri, were detained and brought to Nineveh. While Šarru-lū-dāri was thrown into prison and apparently remained there, Necho was pardoned again, and sent back to Egypt,

"They bro[ught] Necho (and) Šarru-lū-dāri ali[ve] to Nineveh, before me. (As for) Šarru-lū-dāri, who had not honored my kindness (and) sinn[ed against ...], he was thro[wn] into confinement, a place of eternal detainment, [...]. I had mercy on Necho and I l[et him live]. I made (his) treaty more stringent than the previous one ..."

Ashurbanipal also clothed him in extravagant robes and gave him precious metals and jewels.

== See also ==
- Assyrian conquest of Egypt

Preceded by Sidqa	King of Ashkelon; 701 BCE - c. 690 BCE	Succeeded by Mitinti II
