= Gottlieb Christoph Harless =

German classical scholar and bibliographer

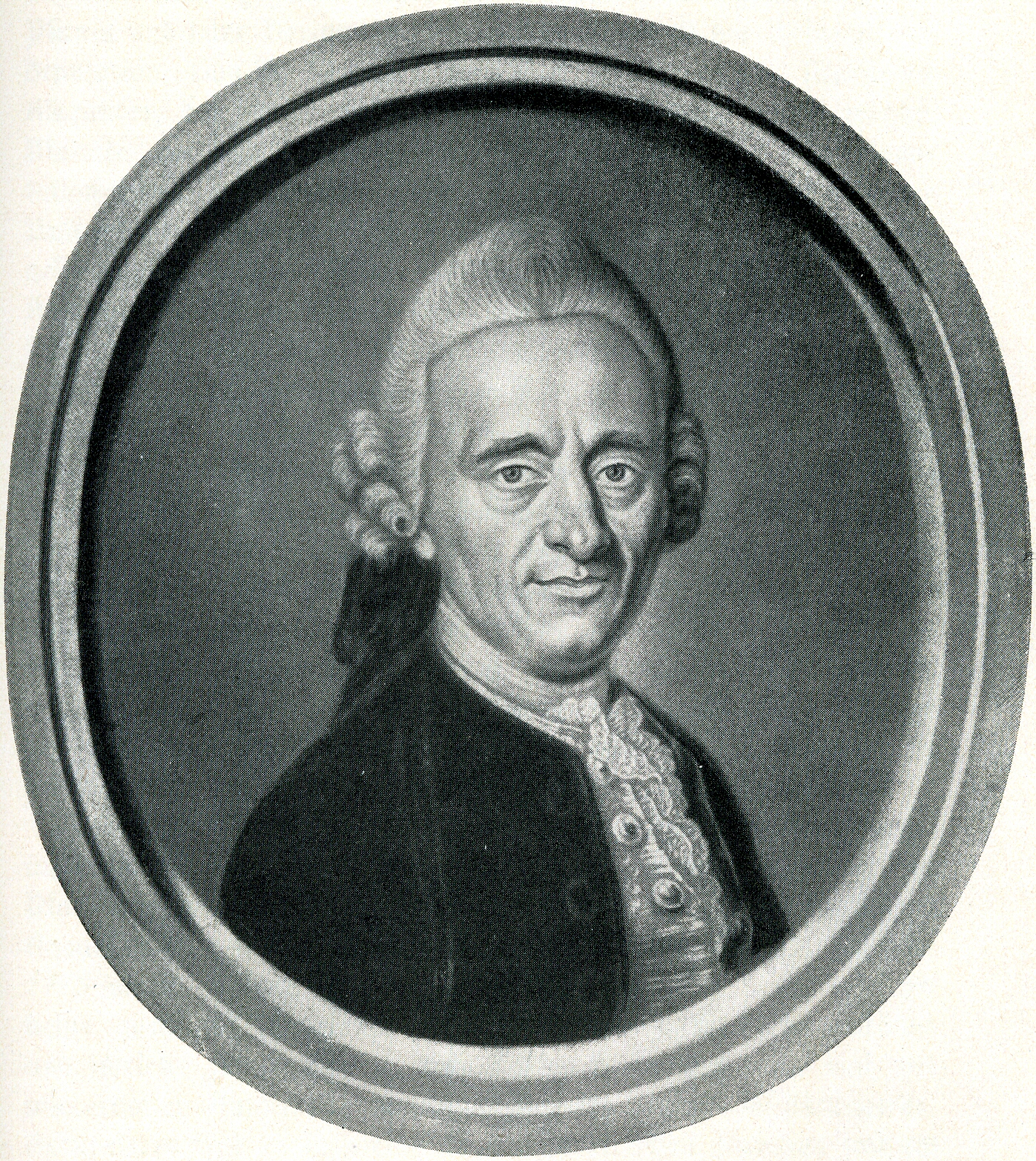
Gottlieb Christoph Harless.

Gottlieb Christoph Harless (originally Harles) (21 June 1738 – 2 November 1815) was a German classical scholar and bibliographer.

== Biography ==
He was born at Culmbach in Bavaria. He studied at the universities of Halle, Erlangen and Jena. In 1765 he was appointed professor of oriental languages and eloquence at the Gymnasium Casimirianum in Coburg, in 1770 professor of poetry and eloquence at Erlangen, and in 1776 librarian of the university. He held his professorship for forty-five years until his death.

Harless was an extremely prolific writer. His numerous editions of classical authors lack originality and critical judgment, but were valuable at the time because they summarised earlier scholarship for the benefit of the student. He is chiefly remembered for his work in connection with the great Bibliotheca Graeca of J. A. Fabricius, of which he published a new and revised edition (12 vols., 1790–1809, not quite completed) — a task for which he was uniquely qualified. He also wrote much on the history and bibliography of Greek and Latin literature.

His biography was written by his son, Johann Christian Friedrich Harless (1818).
