= Artemidorus of Ascalon =

Ancient Greek writer

Artemidorus (Ancient Greek: Ἀρτεμίδωρος) of Ascalon was a writer of ancient Greece who wrote a history of Bithynia. He is also mentioned by Stephanus of Byzantium as one of the distinguished persons of that place.
