= Mitinti =

Name of several Philistine kings

Mitinti (Philistine: 𐤌𐤕𐤕 *Mītīt or *Matīt; Neo-Assyrian Akkadian: 𒁹𒈪𒋾𒅔𒋾, romanized: Mitinti and 𒁹𒈨𒋾𒅔𒋾, Metinti) was the name of several Philistine kings in the 8th and 7th century BC:

- Mitinti I, king of Ascalon and contemporary of Rezin of Aram-Damascus, Ahaz of Judah, Qaus-malaka of Edom, and Shanip of Ammon. The annals of Tiglath-Pileser III record that he was amongst the kings who rebelled against Neo-Assyrian suzerainty over the Levant, and that following the defeat of Rezin and the conquest of Aram-Damascus, the throne of Ascalon was usurped by a man named Rukibtu.
- Mitinti II, another king of Ashkelon, son of Sidqa, who apparently succeeded Rukibtu. He ruled Ashkelon during the reign of Ashurbanipal. A seal belonging to his servant, ‘Abd’eli’ab, was recovered in Ireland in the 19th century and is now housed in the British Museum. How Mitinti II came to rule Ashkelon is somewhat unclear – the annals of Sennacherib state that he had deposed Sidqa as king of Ashkelon and replaced him with Rukibtu's son Šarru-lu-dari after Sidqa instigated a failed revolt against Assyria, however, Šarru-lu-dari was apparently relegated to the governor of Pelusium during the reign of Esarhaddon - how Sidqa's son was then able to claim the throne is unexplained.
- Mitinti, king of Ashdod. He ruled during the reign of Sennacherib. His rule was apparently contemporaneous with that of Sidqa, as Sennacherib's annals report that he was among a retinue of kings that brought him an exuberant payment of tribute before Sidqa's rebellion.

Preceded by Unknown	King of Ashkelon (Mitinti I) ? BCE - c. 732 BCE	Succeeded by Rukibtu

Preceded by Šarru-lu-dari	King of Ashkelon (Mitinti II) c. 690 BCE – ? BCE	Succeeded by Unknown
