= Beth Dagon =

One of two biblical cities in Israel

Beth Dagon or Dagan (בית-דגון or בית-דגן) is the name of two biblical cities in Israel.

- A city (Joshua 15:41) in the territory of the tribe of Judah "in the plains", that is, the territory below Jaffa between the Judean hills and the Mediterranean. Its site is uncertain, though it may be adjacent to Latrun. The city was sacked by Sennacherib during the revolt of Sidqa, king of Ashkelon. Beth Dagon appears in Joshua 15:41 among the list of "the uttermost cities of the tribe of the children of Judah toward the coast of Edom southward."
- A city (Joshua 19:27) in the territory of the tribe of Asher near the territory of Zebulun, southeast of Acre. Some scholars identify it with the Druze town of Beit Jann.
- It also appears in the Tosefta (Ohalot 3:4) transcribed as "Beth Dagan". Moshe Sharon writes that this latter spelling, which corresponds exactly to the Arabic name, may have arisen after the village was conquered by Judea. With Dagon being a head deity in the Philistine pantheon of gods, Sharon speculates that under Judean control, his name was changed to Dagan, meaning "wheat", a symbol of prosperity.

== See also ==
- Beit Dagan
- Bayt Dajan – Arab village southeast of Jaffa, Mandatory Palestine

== Bibliography ==
- Sharon, M. (1999). Corpus Inscriptionum Arabicarum Palaestinae, B-C. Vol. 2. BRILL. ISBN 90-04-11083-6.
