= Bibliotheca Graeca (Fabricius) =

- Author: Johann Albert Fabricius
- Language: Latin
- Subject: Bibliography, Literary history
- Publisher: Hamburg/Leipzig: various publishers
- Publication date: 1705–1728 (1st ed.); 1790–1838 (4th ed.)
- Publication place: Germany

Bibliotheca Graeca (Greek Library) is a bibliographic and historical work on classical and medieval Greek writings, written in Latin by the German librarian, classical philologist, bibliographer, and theologian Johann Albert Fabricius (1668–1736). It was published in Hamburg in the early 18th century.

== Composition and content ==
The first edition of the first volume appeared in 1705; the series index, included in the "fourteenth volume," was published in 1728. The work was conceived by Fabricius as a comprehensive account of Greek literature and scholarship, written entirely in Latin.

Fabricius’s principal achievement remains the 14-volume Bibliotheca Graeca (1705–1728), later revised and continued by Gottlieb Christoph Harleß (1790–1812). Contemporary scholars described it as maximus antiquae eruditionis thesaurus (“the greatest treasure of ancient learning”).

The Bibliotheca Graeca is organized thematically and chronologically. Its major divisions are marked by Homer, Plato, Jesus, Constantine the Great, and the Fall of Constantinople in 1453; a sixth section is devoted to Canon law, Jurisprudence, and Medicine.

== Significance ==
The Bibliotheca Graeca is regarded as one of the most important bibliographical and literary-historical works of the 18th century on Greek literature. It combines extensive source knowledge with a systematic presentation of ancient and Byzantine scholarship.

== Sequence ==
=== Earlier editions arranged mainly by books ===
- Liber 1 de auctoribus ante-Homericis et mythicis (1705)
- Liber 2 ab Homero usque ad decem oratores Atticos Librorum 1 et 2 editio tertia (1718)
- Liber 3: de scriptoribus qui claruerunt a Platone usque ad tempora nati Christi sospitatoris nostri Liber 3 (1707) (1716) (1752)
- Liber 4: de ... scriptoribus claris a tempore nati Christi salvatoris ad Constantinum magnum usque
  - Libri 4 capita 1-21 (1717)
  - Libri 4 pars altera, i.e. capita 22-36, rerum postea in libris 5-6 inclusarum (1711)
- Liber 5: de scriptoribus Graecis Christianis, aliisque qui vixere a Constantini m. aetate ad captam ... a Turcis Constantinopolin
  - de scriptoribus a saeculo I usque ad IV p.C.n. cum supplementis nonnullis Libri 5 pars prima, i.e. capita 1-2 (1712)
  - de auctoribus annalium et historiae ecclesiasticae ac Byzantinae, necnon eroticis scriptoribus Libri 5 pars altera, i.e. capita 3-6, sive volumen VI (1726)
  - de grammaticis Graecis, de poëtis Christianis, etc. Libri 5 pars tertia, i.e. capita 7-17, sive volumen VII (1715) (1727)
  - de philosophis posterioribus etc. Libri 5 pars quarta ac paenultima, i.e. capita 18-31, sive volumen VIII (1717) (1729)
  - de scriptoribus qui vitas sanctorum monachorumque composuere etc. Libri 5 pars ultima, i.e. capita 32-40a, sive volumen IX (1719)
  - de Etymologico Magno et ceteris lexicis Graecis Libri 5 partis ultimae reliqua, i.e. capita 40b-45, sive volumen X (1721) aliter
- Liber 6
  - collectiones Canonum et Conciliorum Libri 6 capita 1-4, sive volumen XI (1722)
  - de medicis Graecis etc. Libri 6 pars altera, i.e. capita 5-8, sive volumen XII (1724)
- vol. IX (1719)
- vol. XIII
- Paralipomena et index generalis volumen XIV (1728)

=== Fourth edition ===
Fourth edition, arranged in twelve volumes, under the direction of Gottlieb Christoph Harless; with the supplements by Christoph August Heumann (Hamburg: Bohn; Leipzig: Breitkopf, 1790–1838).

- vol. 2 (1791)
- vol. 4 librorum 3 et 4 partes (1795)
- vol. 7 librorum 5 et 6 capita 1, 4, 5 (1801)
- vol. 8 (1802)
- vol. 10 libri 5 capita 32-38a etc. (1807)
- vol. 11 libri 5 capita 38-39, 41-45 etc. (1808)

== See also ==
- Bibliotheca Latina

== Editions ==
- Johann Albert Fabricius: Bibliotheca Graeca, Hamburg 1705–1728.
- Gottlieb Christoph Harleß (ed.): Bibliotheca Graeca, 4th ed.; with supplements by Christoph August Heumann (de) (Hamburg: Bohn; Leipzig: Breitkopf, 1790–1838).
