= Chronological list of saints in the 4th century =

A list of people, who died during the 4th century, who have received recognition as Saints

Name	Birth	Birthplace	Death	Place of death	Notes
Abanoub		Nehisa, Egypt		Alexandria, Egypt	child martyr
Abāmūn of Tukh		Toukh, Egypt		Ansena, Egypt	
Abadiu of Antinoe		Egypt		Egypt	
Dasius of Africa			300	Africa	
Gatian			301		Bishop of Tours
Ampelus			302		
Anastasius, Anthony, Julian, Celsus and Marcionilla			302	Antioch	
Cerneuf (Serenus the Gardener)			302		
Julian of Antioch, Cilicia (Julian of Anazarbus)			302		
Julius of Dorostorum			302		
Palatias and Laurentia			302		
Zeno			302		
Persecution under Diocletian and Galerius (303-324) begins
20,000 Martyrs of Nicomedia			303		
Acacius of Sebaste			303	Sebaste	
Agathius (Acacius of Byzantium)			303		
Aceolus and Acius			303		
Alphaeus			303		
Anthimus of Nicomedia			303		Bishop of Nicomedia
Anthimus of Rome			303		
Astericus, Claudius, and Neon (brothers)			303		
Augulus (Aule)			303	London	
Benignus			303	Todi, Umbria	
Caprasius			303		Bishop of Agen
Carponius			303		
Cassius			303		
Claudius			303		
Cyriacus			303		
Dasius of Nicomedia, with Caius and Zoticus			303	Nicomedia	
Denis (Dionysius)			303		Bishop of Augsburg
Devota			303		
Domnina			303		
Edistius			303		
Eleutherius			303		
Ephysius			303		
Erasmus of Formiae (Saint Elmo)			303		Bishop of Formiae
Eulalia of Barcelona	289		303		
Euphemia			303		
Euphrasia of Nicomedia			303		
Fausta and Evilasius			303		
Felicissimus			303		
Felix of Thibiuca, with Audactus, Fortunatus, Januarius, and Septimus			303		Bishop of Thibiuca
Firmina			303		
Genesius of Arles			303		
George			303		
Guy			303		
Hesychius of Antioch			303		
Honoratus			303		
John of Nicomedia (Euthis)			303		
Julitta			303		
Justus of Trieste			303		
Marciana of Mauretania			303	Caesarea	
Martyrs of Cappadocia			303		
Mennas (Menuas)			303		
Nabor and Felix			303		
Pantaleon			303		
Paphnutius			303		
Peter of Nicomedia			303		
Phocas the Gardener			303		
Polycarp of Alexandria			303		
Sabinus and companions			303		
Saturninus			303		
Sergius and Bacchus			303		
Timolaus and Companions			303		
Ulphianus		Tyre, Lebanon	303	Caesarea, Palestine	Martyr
Victor Maurus (Victor the Moor)			303		
Vincent			303		Bishop of Bevagna
Zeno			303		
Abundius and Abundantius and Companions			304	Rome, Italy	
Adrian of Nicomedia			304		Also known as "Hadrian of Nicomedia"
Afra			304		
Agape			304		
Anastasia of Sirmium			304		
Anastasius the Fuller			304		
Andronicus			304		
Ansanus			304		
Anysia			304		
Arcadius			304		
Barlaam			304		
Basilissa (Basilla)			304		
Cantius			304		
Centola and Helen			304		
Charitina of Amisus			304		
Christina of Bolsena			304		
Crispina			304		
Cucuphas (Cucufate, Cugat, Guinefort, Qaqophas)			304		
Cyprian and Justina			304		
Dalmatius			304		Bishop of Pavia
Dasius of Durostorum			304	Durostorum	
Domninus of Fidenza (Domnino)			304		
Donatus, Romulus, Secundian, and 86 Companions			304		
Emerentiana			304		
Emygdius (Emidius)			304		
Eulalia of Merida			304		
Euplus (Euplius)			304		
Febronia	284		304		
Felix and Adauctius			304		
Felix of Spoleto			304		Bishop of Spoleto
Fidelis of Como			304		
Florian			304		
Irenaeus			304		Bishop of Sirmium (present day Sremska Mitrovica)
Irene of Thessalonica			304		
John and Marcianus			304	Rome, Italy	
Julian of Auvergne (Julian of Brioude)			304		
Justus and Pastor			304		
Leocadia			304		
Lucy			304		
Marcellinus			304		
Margaret of Antioch			304		
Martyrs of Saragossa			304		
Maxima			304		
Menodora, Metrodora, and Nymphodora			304		
Modestus			304		
Optatus and 17 companions			304		
Orentius			304		
Orestes of Cappadocia			304		
Pancras			304		
Pelagia of Tarsus			304		
Philip of Heraclea			304		Bishop of Heraclea
Philomena			304		
Pollio			304		
Quadratus			304		Bishop of Anatolia
Quiriacus and Julitta			304	Tarsus, Roman Empire	
Quirinus			304		Bishop of Siscia
Romanus of Antioch			304		
Rufus and Companions			304		
Saturninus, Dativus, and Companions			304		
Saturninus			304		
Sergius			304		
Severus			304		
Simplicius			304		
Soteris			304		martyr, related to Ambrose
Tharacus (Taracus)	239		304		
Theodora and Didymus			304		
Theodotus of Ancyra and companions			304		
Timothy			304		Bishop of Gaza
Victoria and Anatolia			304		
Victorinus			304		Bishop of Pettau (now Styria)
Vincent of Collioure			304		
Vincent of Saragossa			304		
Vitalis and Agricola			304	Bologna	
Zambdas (Bazas, Zabdas)			304		Bishop of Jerusalem
Zoilus			304	Cordoba, Spain	
Agapius			305		
Alban			305		
Aphian	286		305		
Castus and Secundinus			305		
Dioscurus			305		
Hermolaus			305		
Januarius			305		Bishop of Benevento
Juliana of Nicomedia			305		
Julius and Aaron			305		
Paul, Heraclius, and Companions			305		
Pelagia the Penitent			305		
Philemon and Apollonius			305		
Restitutus			305		
Servandus and Cermanus			305		
Thecia			305		
Theodora			305		
Valerian			305		Bishop of Auxerre
Vincent, Orontius, and Victor			305		
Aedesius of Alexandria			306		
Agapius			306		
Antonina			306		
Cyrenia and Juliana			306		
Four Crowned Martyrs			306		
Lucretia			306		
Plato			306		
Secundinus			306		
Asteria			307		
Catherine of Alexandria			307		
Cyriaca and Five Companions			307		
Maternus			307		Bishop of Milan
Meuris and Thea			307		
Phileas of Thmuis			307		Bishop of Thumis
Valentine			307		Bishop of Genoa
Varus			307		
Agathangelus and Clement			308		
Cleonicus			308		
Paul of Gaza			308		
Platonides			308		
Thea and Valentina			308		
Thea			308		
Theodosia			308		
Basilissa	300		309		
Caesarius			309		
Daniel			309		
Eusebius			309		pope
Julian of Caesarea			309		
Marcellus I			309		pope
Pamphilus, priest and martyr, and Companions			309		
Saturninus, priest and martyr, and Sisinius			309		
Theodulus			309		
Valens			309		
Adrian and Eubulus			310		
Domnina			310		
Dulas (Tatian Dulas)			310		
Eleutherius			310		
Eulampius and Eulampia			310		
Maximus			310		
Peleus and Companions			310		
Peleusius			310		
Pierius			310		
Theodore			310		Bishop of Cyrene
Tyrannio, Zenobius, and Companions	304		310		
Aquila			311		
Arian and Companions			311		
Dorothy			311		
Eudoxius, Zeno, and Companions			311		
Faustus			311		
Methodius			311		Bishop of Olympus
Pastor			311		
Pelagia the Virgin			311		
Peter Balsam			311		
Peter			311		Bishop of Alexandria
Savina			311		
Adauctus			312		
Basiliscus			312		Bishop of Comana, Pontus
Brictus			312		Bishop of Martola
Lucian of Antioch			312		
Mennas			312		
Paschasius			312		Bishop of Vienne
Achillas			313		Bishop of Alexandria
Antonina and Alexander			313		
Mellon (Mallonius, Mellouns, Melanius)			314		Bishop of Rouen
Miltiades (Melchiades)			314		pope
Mitrius (Merre, Metre, Mitre)			314		
Verus			314		Bishop of Vienne
Carterius			315		
Gordius			315	Caesarea in Cappadocia	Soldier and martyr.
Hermylus			315		
Stratonicus			315		
Valerius			315		Bishop of Saragossa
Blaise			316		Bishop of Sebastea
Mirocles (Merocles)			316		
Theodota of Philippolis			318		
Basileus			319		Bishop of Amasea
Cleopatra			319		
Argeus			320		
Christina (Nino)			320		
Cyrinus			320		
Cyrion, Candidus, and companions			320		
Forty Holy Martyrs of Sabaste			320		
Illuminata		Ravenna	320	Massa Martana	
Leontius, Maurice, Daniel, and companions			320		
Narcissus, Argeus, and Marcellinus			320	Tomi	
Phocas of Antioch			320		
Severian			320		
Valerius			320		Bishop of Trier
Auxentius			321		Bishop of Mopsuestia
Abibus			323		
Gurias and Samonas			323		
Glaphyra			324		
Philogonius			324		Bishop of Antioch
Romana			324		
After the Roman persecutions
Hypatius of Gangra			325		Bishop of Gangra
Metrophanes			325		Bishop of Byzantium
Palaemon			325		
Theodotus of Cyrenia			325		Bishop of Cyrenia
Apollonius			326		Bishop of Benevento
Epipodius and Alexander			326		
Zanitas and companions			326		
Jonas, Barachisius, and companions			327		
Alexander	250		328		Bishop of Alexandria
Gregory the Illuminator	257		328		Catholicos of All Armenians
Agricius of Trier			329		Bishop of Trier
Achillas (Achilles, Achillius)			330		Bishop of Larissa
Gregory the Enlightener			330		Bishop of Ashtishat
Helena			330		
Theodore Trichinas			330		
Ammon			332		
Macarius I			334		Bishop of Jerusalem
Rheticus of Autun			334		Bishop of Autun
Theodotus of Laodicea			334		Bishop of Laodicea
Basil			335		Bishop of Bologna
Heliodorus of Mesopotamia			335		Bishop of Mesopotamia
Sylvester I			335		Pope
Mark			336		Pope
Constantine the Great			337		
Leontius			337		Bishop of Cuesaren
Eustathius of Antioch			338		
James (Jacob)			338		Bishop of Nisibis
Paul the Simple			339		
Alexander			340		Bishop of Constantinople
Cassian			340		Bishop of Benevento
Gudelia			340		
Macrina the Elder			340		
Potamon of Heraclea			340		
Milles			341		
Simeon Barsabae and Companions			341		
Usthazanes			341		
Abdiesus (Hebed Jesus)			342		
Barsabas			342		
Martyrs of Alexandria			342		
Paul the First Hermit	229		342		
Sadoth and 128 companions			342		
Mamelta (Mamelchtina)			343		
Nerses of Sahgerd			343		
Nicholas			343		Bishop of Myra
Olympius			343		Bishop of Enos
Paternian			343		Bishop of Fano
John and James			344		
Abraham			345		Bishop of Arbela
Acyndinus and Companions			345		
Ananias the Persian			345		
Aphrahat (Aphraates) "the Persian Sage"	ca.270		ca.345		
Martyrs of Persia			345		
Tarbula (Tarba, Tarbo)			345		
Timothy and Diogenes			345		
Barbasymas and Companions			346		
Paris			346		Bishop of Teano
Maximinus			347		Bishop of Trier
Pachomius			347		
Ursicinus			347		Bishop of Brescia
Spiridion	270		348	Trimythous, Cyprus	Thaumaturge
Ammon			350		
Cassian			350		Bishop of Autun
Lucius			350		Bishop of Adrianople
Maximus			350		Bishop of Jerusalem
Myron			350		
Paul	313		350		Bishop of Constantinople
Zoticus of Comana			350		
Julius I			352		Pope
Amand of Strasbourg	290		355		
Barhadbesciabas (Barhadbesaba)			355		
Amasius			356		Bishop of Teano
Anthony	251		356		
Joseph of Palestine			356		
Paphnutius the Great			356		
Serapion the Sindonite			356		
Sarmata			357		
Secundus, priest and martyr, and Companions			357		
Arsacius			358		
Paulinus			358	Phrygia	Bishop of Trier
Dionysius			359		Bishop of Milan
Abra	342		360		
Abraham Kidunaja			360		
Carina, Melasippus, and Antony (wife, husband, son)			360		
Domitius			361		
Onesimus			361		Bishop of Soissons
Basil of Ancyra			362		
Dometius of Persia (Domitius)			362		
Dorotheus of Tyre			362		
Eliphius (Eloff)			362		
Elpidius			362		
Emilian			362		
Eusebius, Nestablus, Zeno, and Nestor			362	Gaza	Martyrs
Eusignius	252		362	Antioch	
Flavian			362		
Gemellus			362		
Gordian			362		
Heliodorus			362		
John and Paul			362		
John			362		
Leopardus			362		
Macedonius			362		
Pigmenius			362		
Porphyrius			362		
Primus and Donatus			362		
Theodoret of Antioch			362		
Timothy			362		
Dafrosa			362		
Bibiana (Viviana)			363		
Cassian of Imola			363	Imola	
Demetria			363		
Juventinus and Maximinus			363		
Patermuthius			363		
Paul and Companions			364		
Astericus			365	Petra, Roman Empire	Bishop of Petra
Isidora the Simple			365		
Florence			366		
Abraham the Poor (Abraham the Child)			367		
Hilary	315		367		Bishop of Poitiers
Juvenal			367		Bishop of Narni
Dadas			368		
Caesarius of Nazianzus			369		
Bathus and Companions			370		
Julian			370		
Justin			370		
Publia			370		
Serapion the Scholastic (Serapion of Arsinoc)			370		Bishop of Thmuis
Triphyllius (Tryphillius)			370		Bishop of Nicosia
Eusebius	283		371		Bishop of Vercelli
Zeno			371		Bishop of Verona
Abraham the Poor		Menuf, Egypt	372		hermit
Abāmūn of Tarnūt		Tarnut	372	Alexandria	martyr
Gorgonia			372		
Hilarion	292		372		
Moses			372		Bishop of the Saracens
Sabas the Goth			372		
Athanasius	296		373		Bishop of Alexandria
Ephrem the Syrian	306		373		
Nerses I (Nerses the Great)	330		373		
Marcellinus of Embrun			374		
Nonna of Nazianzus			374		
Nicetas the Goth			375		
Victor			375		Bishop of Piacenza
Acepsimas			376		Bishop of Hnaita
Bademus			376		
Hilary			376		Bishop of Pavia
Joseph of Persia			376		
Julian Sabas the Elder			377		
Maximus			378		Bishop of Mainz
Viator of Bergamo			378		Bishop of Bergamo
Basil the Great	329		379		Bishop of Caesarea
Eusebius of Samosata			379		
Irene			379		
Macrina the Younger	330		379		
Satyrus	330		379		
Vincent of Digne			379		Bishop of Digne
Bretannion			380		Bishop of Tomi
Frumentius			380		Bishop of Ethiopia
Hesychius			380		
Milles			380		
Orsiesius (Orsisius)			380		
Ursicinus			380		Bishop of Sens
Meletius			381		
Pelagius			381		Bishop of Laodicea
Blaesilla			383		
Ursula			383		
Damasus I	305		384		Pope
Lea of Rome			384		
Maximus and Victorinus			384		
Servatus (Servatius, Servais)			384		Bishop of Tongres
Melas			385		Bishop of Rhinocolura
Romanus of Le Mans			385		
Brito (Britonius)			386		Bishop of Trier
Cyril	315		386		Bishop of Jerusalem
Helladius of Auxerre			387		Bishop of Auxerre
Monica	322		387		
Optatus			387		Bishop of Milevis
Philastrius (Philaster, Filaster)			387		Bishop of Brescia
Florus			389		Bishop of Lodève
Gregory Nazianzen	329		389		Bishop of Constantinople
Marcellus of Apamaea			389		
Valerian of Aquileia			389		Bishop of Aquileia
Abraham of Carrhae			390		
Donatian of Reims			390		Bishop of Reims
Felix of Como			390		Bishop of Como
Justus of Lyons			390		
Liborius			390		Bishop of Le Mans
Macarius of Egypt	300		391		
Martyrs of the Serapeum			390		
Pacian			390		Bishop of Barcelona
Palladius			390		
Pambo			390		
Sabinian and Potentian			390		
Urban			390		Bishop of Langres
Viator			390		
Vitalina			390		
Peter of Sebaste	345		392		Bishop of Sebastea (Sivas)
Phaebadius (Fiari)			392		Bishop of Agen
John of Egypt	305		394		
Macarius of Alexandria			394		
Martyrs of Chalcedon			394		
Apollo	305		395		
Gregory of Nyssa	335		395		
Menna (Manna)			395		
Pior			395		
Theonas of Egypt			395		
Artemius			396		Bishop of Clermont
Crescentius			396		
Geminian			396		
Ambrose	340		397		Bishop of Milan
Lawrence of Novara			397		
Martin of Tours	316		397		Bishop of Tours
Sisinnius			397		
Abraham of Scetis		Egypt	399	Djirdjeh, Egypt	monk
Siricius			399		pope
Almachius (Telemachus)			400		
Amphilochius	339		400		Bishop of Iconium
Apollinaris Syncletica	316		400		
Armentarius			400		
Fortunatus			400		
Liberalis			400		
Pamphilus			400		Bishop of Capua
Rufus of Metz			400		Bishop of Metz
Venantius			400		
Viventius			400		
Zeno			400		Bishop of Gaza

== See also ==
- Christianity in the 4th century
- List of Church Fathers
