= Fortunata =

Fortunata may refer to:

== Arts and entertainment ==
- Fortunata (film), a 2017 film
- Fortunata, a 1911 novel by Marjorie Patterson

== People ==
- Fortunata (name)
- Saint Fortunata, a 4th-century Christian martyr

=== Fictional characters ===
- Fortunata, the wife of Trimalchio in Petronius' Satyricon
- Fortunata, character in the novel Fortunata y Jacinta by Benito Pérez Galdós
- Fortunata, character in the novel The Heretic's Apprentice

== See also ==
- Fortunato (disambiguation)
