= Saint Dasius =

Saint Dasius may refer to either of two early Christian saints, both Roman soldiers executed during the Diocletian Persecution:

- Dasius of Durostorum
- Dasius of Nicomedia
