= Fortunato =

Fortunato, the Italian form of the Latin: fortunatus, is a given name and a surname. Notable people and characters with the name include:

== People ==
=== Surname ===
- Andrea Fortunato (1971–1995), Italian footballer
- Bartolomé Fortunato (born 1974), American major league baseball pitcher
- Flavia Fortunato (born 1964), Italian pop singer, actress and television presenter
- Giustino Fortunato (1848–1932), Italian historian and politician
- Gregório Fortunato (1900–1962), Brazilian personal guard
- Jacopo Fortunato (born 1990), Italian footballer
- Joe Fortunato (coach) (1918–2004), American college sports coach and college athletics administrator
- Joe Fortunato (linebacker) (1930–2017), American football linebacker in the National Football League
- Laura Fortunato (academic), evolutionary anthropologist
- Laura Fortunato (referee) (born 1985), Argentine football referee
- Mario Fortunato (1904–1970), Argentine footballer
- René Fortunato (1958–2025), Dominican director, screenwriter and producer
- Sergio Fortunato (born 1956), Argentine footballer
- Stefano Fortunato (born 1990), Italian footballer

=== Given name ===
- Fortunato of Brescia (1701–1754), Italian anatomist
- Fortunato Arriola (1827–1872), Mexican landscape and portrait painter who lived in San Francisco, California, United States
- Fortunato Bonelli, the namesake of the Estadio Fortunato Bonelli in San Nicolás, Argentina.
- Fortunato Depero (1892–1960), Italian futurist painter, writer, sculptor and graphic designer
- Fortunato Mizzi (1844–1905), founder of Malta's Reform Party
- Fortunato Pasqualino (1923–2008), Italian writer
- Fortunato Brescia Tassano (fl. 1889–1951), Italian-born Peruvian businessman
- António Fortunato de Figueiredo (1903–1981), Indian violinist and conductor
- Leopoldo Fortunato Galtieri (1926–2003), Argentine general who served as de facto President of Argentina

== Fictional characters ==
- Fortunato, a character in Edgar Allan Poe's "The Cask of Amontillado"
- Don Fortunato, a Marvel Comics villain
- Leon Fortunato, a character in the Left Behind Series

== See also ==
- Fortunato (film), 1942 Spanish film
- Fortunato (yacht), a 205-foot megayacht built by Feadship in 2000
- Fortunatus (disambiguation), a given name, also Saint Fortunatus
