= Lilaeus (mythology) =

Mythological shepherd

According to Pseudo-Plutarch's Treatise on Rivers and Mountains, Lilaeus (Ancient Greek: Λίλαιος, Lílaios) was an Indian shepherd who angered the gods and was punished for it.

== Mythology ==
A shepherd in India named Lilaeus acknowledged only the Moon (the goddess Selene) among the gods, and only honoured her by performing her rituals and mysteries during the night. The other gods were angered over his actions and rejection of them, and sent two wild lions that tore him apart. Selene then transformed her adorer into a mountain, known as Mount Lilaeon (Ancient Greek: Λίλαιον, Lílaion), situated somewhere near the Indus river.

== Origins ==
The author of Treatise on Rivers and Mountains, now known not to have been the actual Plutarch, attributed this story to Clitophon the Rhodian's first book of Indian Relations, perhaps writing down a local Indian tale using the names of the Greek gods via interpretatio graeca.

This work, probably dating to the second century AD, is today thought to be some sort of paradoxography, or a parody of paradoxography, and was probably written in a humorous, non-serious tone.

== See also ==
- Ampelus
- Baucis and Philemon
- Callisto
- Syceus
