= Laura Fortunato =

Laura Fortunato may refer to the following people:

- Laura Fortunato (academic)
- Laura Fortunato (referee)
