= Eubulus =

Eubulus is the name of:

People:

- Eubulus (banker), 4th century BC Bithynian banker and ruler of Atarneus
- Eubulus (statesman) (c. 405 BC – c. 335 BC), Athenian statesman
- Eubulus (poet), 4th century BC Athenian poet
- Saint Eubulus (died 308), Greek Christian martyr
- Eubulus, a Praetorian prefect of Illyricum (in the Roman Empire) in 436
- Eubulus le Strange, 1st Baron Strange (died 1335), English baron
- Eubulus or Eubule Thelwall (c. 1557 – 1630), Welsh lawyer, academic and politician who sat in the House of Commons

Characters in English plays:

- Eubulus, from the 1561 play Gorboduc
- Eubulus, from the 1673 play Marriage à la mode by John Dryden
- Eubulus, from the 17th century play The Coronation

Other uses:

- Eubulus, an associate of the Apostle Paul mentioned in the Second Epistle to Timothy (4:21)
- Eubulus, 1913 winner of the Australian VRC Sires Produce Stakes Thoroughbred horse race
- Eubulus (beetle), a genus of weevils in the family Curculionidae
