= Chronological list of Christian theologians in the 4th century =

A list of 4th century Christian Theologians:

Name	Birth	Birthplace	Death	Place of Death	Notes
Arius	c. AD 250	Libya	c. AD 336	Alexandria	Deacon in Alexandria, Declared Heretical at the First Council of Nicaea
Anthony the Great	c. AD 251	Herakleopolis Magna	c. AD 356	Mount Colzim	Father of Hermetic Monasticism
Eusebius of Caesarea	c. AD 263	Caesarea Maritima	c. AD 339		Bishop of Caesarea, Church Historian
Pachomius	c. AD 292	Thebes	c. AD 348		Founder of Christian Cenobitic Monasticism
Athanasius of Alexandria	c. AD 296	Alexandria	2 May AD 373		Bishop of Alexandria, Doctor of the Church
Hilary of Poitiers	c. AD 300	Poitiers	c. AD 386		Bishop of Poitiers, Doctor of the Church, sometimes known as "Athanasius of the West"
Cyril of Jerusalem	c. AD 313	Caesarea Maritima	c. AD 386	Jerusalem	Bishop of Jerusalem, Doctor of Church
Didymus the Blind	c. AD 313		c. AD 398		Teacher of the Catechetical School of Alexandria
Basil of Caesarea	c. AD 329	Caesarea Mazaca	1 January AD 379	Caesarea Mazaca	One of the three Cappadocian Fathers, Bishop of Caesarea Mazaca, Doctor of the Church, Brother of Gregory of Nyssa
Gregory of Nazianzus	c. AD 329	Arianzus	25 January c. AD 389	Arianzus	One of the three Cappadocian Fathers, Doctor of the Church
Gregory of Nyssa	c. AD 335	Caesarea Mazaca	c. AD 395	Nyssa	One of the three Cappadocian Fathers, Bishop of Nyssa, Brother of Basil of Caesarea
Meletius of Antioch			c. AD 381	Antioch	Bishop of Antioch
Augustine of Hippo	13 November AD 354	Thagaste	28 August AD 430	Hippo Regius	Bishop of Hippo Regius, Prolific Theologian

== See also ==
- Christianity in the 4th century
- List of Church Fathers
