= Fortunata (name) =

Fortunata is an Italian girl's name. Fortunata is celebrated on October 14 in memory of Santa Fortunata, a 4th-century Christian martyr in Caesarea. The Roman Catholic Church recognizes nineteen Saints and Saints bearing the name Fortunato and Fortunata.

== People ==
- Saint Fortunata, martyr at Rome (14 February)
- Saint Fortunata, martyr venerated at Patria (14 October)
- Fortunata (enslaved person), a woman sold into slavery in Roman London in the first or second centuries AD
- Maria Fortunata d'Este (1731–1803), Modenese princess by birth and a princess of the blood of France by marriage
- Blessed Maria Fortunata Viti (1827–1922), Italian Benedictine nun (20 November)

== Fictional characters ==
- Fortunata, the titular seagull in the animated film La gabbianella e il gatto (1998)
- Fortunata, the lead character in the film Fortunata (2017)
- Fortunata, the wife of Trimalchio in the Satyricon of Petronius (1st century AD)
- Fortunata, in the novel Fortunata y Jacinta by Benito Pérez Galdós (1887)
- Fortunata, an anthropomorphic fox in the book Mossflower, part of the Redwall series
- Fortunata, in the novel The Heretic's Apprentice by Ellis Peters (1989)
