= Syceus =

Son of Gaia in Greek mythology

In Greek mythology, Syceus (Ancient Greek: Συκεύς, Sykeus, from συκέα meaning "fig-tree") was a Titan son of Gaia (Earth) and eponym of the city of Sykea in Cilicia.

== Mythology ==
Only Athenaeus in his Deipnosophistae mentioned Sykeus' myth with his source being Tryphon's Of Plants (or Names of Plants) and Androtion's Farmers' Handbook:

Sykeus, one of the Titans, was pursued by Zeus and taken under the protection of his mother, Earth, and that she caused the plant [the fig] to grow for her son's pleasure.

— Deipnosophistae

== See also ==
- Daphne
- Pitys
- Myrrha
- Lilaeus
- Myrsine
