= Christianity in the 4th century =

Christianity in the 4th century was dominated in its early stage by Constantine the Great and the First Council of Nicaea of 325, which was the beginning of the period of the First seven Ecumenical Councils (325–787), and in its late stage by the Edict of Thessalonica of 380, which made Nicene Christianity the state church of the Roman Empire.

== Christian persecutions ==
Major communions of the 4th-5th centuries
Communion	Primary centers
Roman Empire and western Europe	Rome, Alexandria, Constantinople
Church of the East	Syria, Sasanian (Persia) Empire
Oriental Orthodox or Non-Chalcedonian	Armenia, Syria, Egypt
Donatist Church	North Africa
Gothic Arian Church	Gothic tribes

With Christianity the dominant faith in some urban centers, Christians accounted for approximately 10% of the Roman population by 300, according to some estimates. Roman Emperor Diocletian launched the bloodiest campaign against Christians that the empire had witnessed. The persecution ended in 311 with the death of Diocletian. The persecution ultimately had not turned the tide on the growth of the religion, and because of the rapid growth, Christians accounted for 56.5% of the Roman population by 350. Christians had already organized to the point of establishing hierarchies of bishops. In 301 the Kingdom of Armenia became the first nation to adopt Christianity, followed by the Georgians in 324, the Axumite Empire circa 328 and the Romans in 380.

== Roman Empire ==
=== Under Galerius ===
In April 311, Galerius, who had previously been one of the leading figures in the persecutions, issued an edict permitting the practice of the Christian religion under his rule. From 313 to 380, Christianity enjoyed the status of being a legal religion within the Roman Empire. It had not become the sole authorized state religion, although it gradually gained prominence and stature within Roman society. After halting the persecutions of the Christians, Galerius reigned for another 2 years. He was then succeeded by an emperor with distinctively pro-Christian leanings, Constantine the Great.

=== Constantine I ===
Christian sources record that Constantine experienced a dramatic event in 312 at the Battle of Milvian Bridge, after which Constantine claimed the emperorship in the West. According to these sources, Constantine looked up to the sun before the battle and saw a cross of light above it, and with it the Greek words "ΕΝ ΤΟΥΤΩ ΝΙΚΑ" ("by this, conquer!", often rendered in the Latin "in hoc signo vinces"); Constantine commanded his troops to adorn their shields with a Christian symbol (the Chi-Ro), and thereafter they were victorious. How much Christianity Constantine adopted at this point is difficult to discern; most influential people in the empire, especially high military officials, were still pagan, and Constantine's rule exhibited at least a willingness to appease these factions.

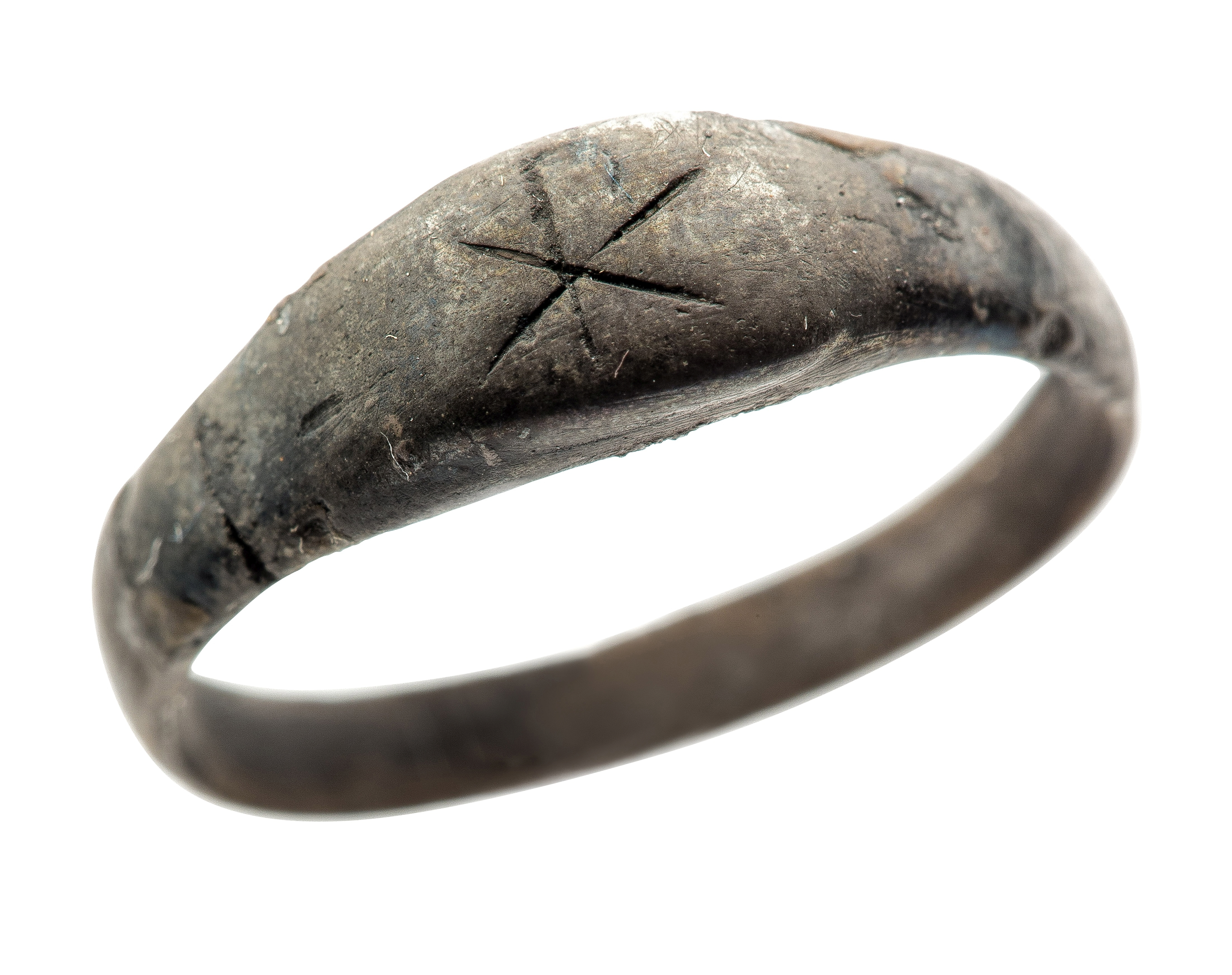
Silver ring with Chi Rho symbol found at a 4th-century Christian burial site in Late Roman Tongeren, one of the oldest proofs of a Christian community in Belgium, Gallo-Roman Museum (Tongeren)

=== The conversion to Christianity ===
The accession of Constantine was a turning point for the Christian Church. In 313, Constantine issued the Edict of Milan affirming the tolerance of Christians. Thereafter, he supported the Church financially, built various basilicas, granted privileges (e.g., exemption from certain taxes) to clergy, promoted Christians to high ranking offices, and returned property confiscated during the reign of Diocletian. Constantine utilized Christian symbols early in his reign but still encouraged traditional Roman religious practices including sun worship. Between 324 and 330, he built a new imperial capital at Byzantium on the Bosphorus (it came to be named for him: Constantinople)–the city employed overtly Christian architecture, contained churches within the city walls (unlike "old" Rome), and had no pagan temples. In 330 he established Constantinople as the new capital of the Roman Empire. The city would gradually come to be seen as the center of the Christian world.

Sociologist Joseph Bryant asserts that, by the time of Constantine, Christianity had already changed from its first century instantiation as a "marginal, persecuted, and popularly despised Christian sect" to become the fully institutionalized church "capable of embracing the entire Roman empire" that Constantine adopted. Without this transformation that Peter Brown has called "the conversion of Christianity" to the culture and ideals of the Roman world, Brown says Constantine would never have converted himself.

By the end of the second century, Christianity was steadily expanding and its membership was socially rising. The church was becoming increasingly institutionalized, and there is evidence of moral erosion and declining commitment amongst its expanding membership. Bryant explains that, "The governing principle of the [sect is] in the personal holiness of its members". A church, on the other hand, is an organization where sanctity is found in the institution rather than the individual. To become a church, "Christianity had to overcome its alienation from the 'world' and successfully weather persecution, accept that it was no longer an ecclesia pura, (a sect of the holy and the elect), but was instead a corpus permixtum, a 'catholic' Church geared to mass conversions and institutionally endowed with extensive powers of sacramental grace and redemption". This "momentous transformation" threatened the survival of the marginal religious movement as it naturally led to divisions, schisms and defections. Bryant explains that, "once those within a sect determine that "the 'spirit' no longer resides in the parent body, 'the holy and the pure' typically find themselves compelled – either by conviction or coercion – to withdraw and establish their own counter-church, consisting of the 'gathered remnant' of God's elect". According to Bryant, this describes all the schisms of Christianity's first 300 years including the Montanists, the schism created by Hippolytus in 218 under Callistus, the Melitian schism, and the Donatists.

It is the Donatist schism that Bryant sees as the culmination of this sect to church dynamic. During the Melitian schism and the beginnings of the Donatist division, bishop Cyprian had felt compelled to "grant one laxist concession after another in the course of his desperate struggle to preserve the Catholic church". Roman emperors had always been religious leaders, but Constantine established precedent for the position of the Christian emperor in the Church. These emperors considered themselves responsible to God for the spiritual health of their subjects, and thus they had a duty to maintain orthodoxy. The emperor did not decide doctrine – that was the responsibility of the bishops – rather his role was to enforce doctrine, root out heresy, and uphold ecclesiastical unity. The emperor ensured that God was properly worshiped in his empire; what proper worship consisted of was the responsibility of the church. Constantine had commissioned more than one investigation into the Donatist issues and they all ruled in support of the Catholic cause, yet the Donatists refused to submit to either imperial or ecclesiastical authority. For a Roman emperor, that was sufficient cause to act. Brown says Roman authorities had shown no hesitation in "taking out" the Christian church they had seen as a threat to empire, and Constantine and his successors did the same, for the same reasons. Constantine's precedent of deferring to councils on doctrine, and accepting responsibility for their enforcement, would continue generally until the empire's end, although there were a few emperors of the 5th and 6th centuries who sought to alter doctrine by imperial edict without recourse to councils.

In 325 Constantine called for the Council of Nicaea, which was effectively the first Ecumenical Council (the Council of Jerusalem was the first recorded Christian council but rarely is it considered ecumenical), to deal mostly with the Arian heresy, but which also issued the Nicene Creed, which among other things professed a belief in One Holy Catholic Apostolic Church, the start of Christendom. John Kaye characterizes the conversion of Constantine, and the council of Nicea, as two of the most important things to ever happen to the Christian church.

=== Constantius II ===
Constantine's sons banned pagan State religious sacrifices in 341 but did not close the temples. Although all State temples in all cities were ordered shut in 356, there is evidence that traditional sacrifices continued. When Gratian declined the position and title of Pontifex Maximus, his act effectively brought an end to the state religion because of the position's authority and ties within the administration. This ended state official practices but not the private religious practices, and consequently the temples remained open.

There was not a total unity of Christianity however, and Constantius II was an Arian who kept Arian bishops at his court and installed them in various sees, expelling the orthodox bishops.

=== Julian the Apostate ===
Constantius's successor, Julian, known in the Christian world as Julian the Apostate, was a philosopher who upon becoming emperor renounced Christianity and embraced a Neo-platonic and mystical form of paganism shocking the Christian establishment. While not actually outlawing Christianity, he became intent on re-establishing the prestige of the old pagan beliefs and practices. He modified these practices to resemble Christian traditions such as the episcopal structure and public charity (hitherto unknown in Roman paganism). Julian eliminated most of the privileges and prestige previously afforded to the Christian Church. His reforms attempted to create a form of religious heterogeneity by, among other things, reopening pagan temples, accepting Christian bishops previously exiled as heretics, promoting Judaism, and returning Church lands to their original owners. However, Julian's short reign ended when he died while campaigning in the East. Christianity came to dominance during the reign of Julian's successors, Jovian, Valentinian I, and Valens (the last Eastern Arian Christian emperor).

=== Nicaea Christianity becomes the state religion of the Roman Empire ===
Over the course of the 4th century the Christian body became consumed by debates surrounding orthodoxy, i.e. which religious doctrines are the correct ones. By the early 4th century a group in North Africa, later called Donatists, who believed in a very rigid interpretation of Christianity that excluded many who had abandoned the faith during the Diocletian persecutions, created a crisis in the western Empire. A Church synod, or council, was called in Rome in 313 followed by another in Arles in 314. The latter was presided over by Constantine while he was still a junior emperor. The councils ruled that the Donatist faith was heresy, and when the Donatists refused to recant, Constantine launched the first campaign of persecution by Christians against Christians. This was only the beginning of imperial involvement in the Christian theology.

Christian scholars within the empire were increasingly embroiled in debates regarding Christology. Opinions were widespread ranging from the belief that Jesus was entirely mortal to the belief that he was an Incarnation of God that had taken human form. The most persistent debate was that between the homoousian view (the Father and the Son are one and the same, eternal) and the Arian view (the Father and the Son are separate, but both divine). This controversy led to Constantine's calling a council meeting at Nicaea in 325.

Christological debates raged throughout the 4th century with emperors becoming ever more involved with the Church and the Church becoming ever more divided. The Council of Nicaea in 325 supported the Athanasian view. The Council of Rimini in 359 supported the Arian view. The Council of Constantinople in 360 supported a compromise that allowed for both views. The Council of Constantinople in 381 re-asserted the Athanasian view and rejected the Arian view. Emperor Constantine was of divided opinions, but he largely backed the Athanasian faction (though he was baptized on his death bed by the Arian bishop Eusebius of Nicomedia). His successor Constantius II supported a Semi-Arian position. Emperor Julian favored a return the traditional Roman/Greek religion, but this trend was quickly quashed by his successor Jovian, a supporter of the Athanasian faction.

In 380 Emperor Theodosius issued the Edict of Thessalonica, which established Christianity as the official state religion, specifically the faith established by the Council of Nicaea in 325: Theodosius called the Council of Constantinople in 381 to further refine the definition of orthodoxy. In 391 Theodosius closed all of the pagan (non-Christian and non-Jewish) temples and formally forbade pagan worship. These adhering state churches can be seen as effectively a department of the Roman state. All other Christian sects were explicitly declared heretical and illegal. In 385, came the first capital punishment of a heretic was carried out on Priscillian of Ávila.

== Ecumenical Councils of the 4th century ==
The First Council of Nicaea (325) and the First Council of Constantinople (381) were a part of what would later be called the first seven Ecumenical Councils, which span 400 years of church history.

=== First Council of Nicaea ===
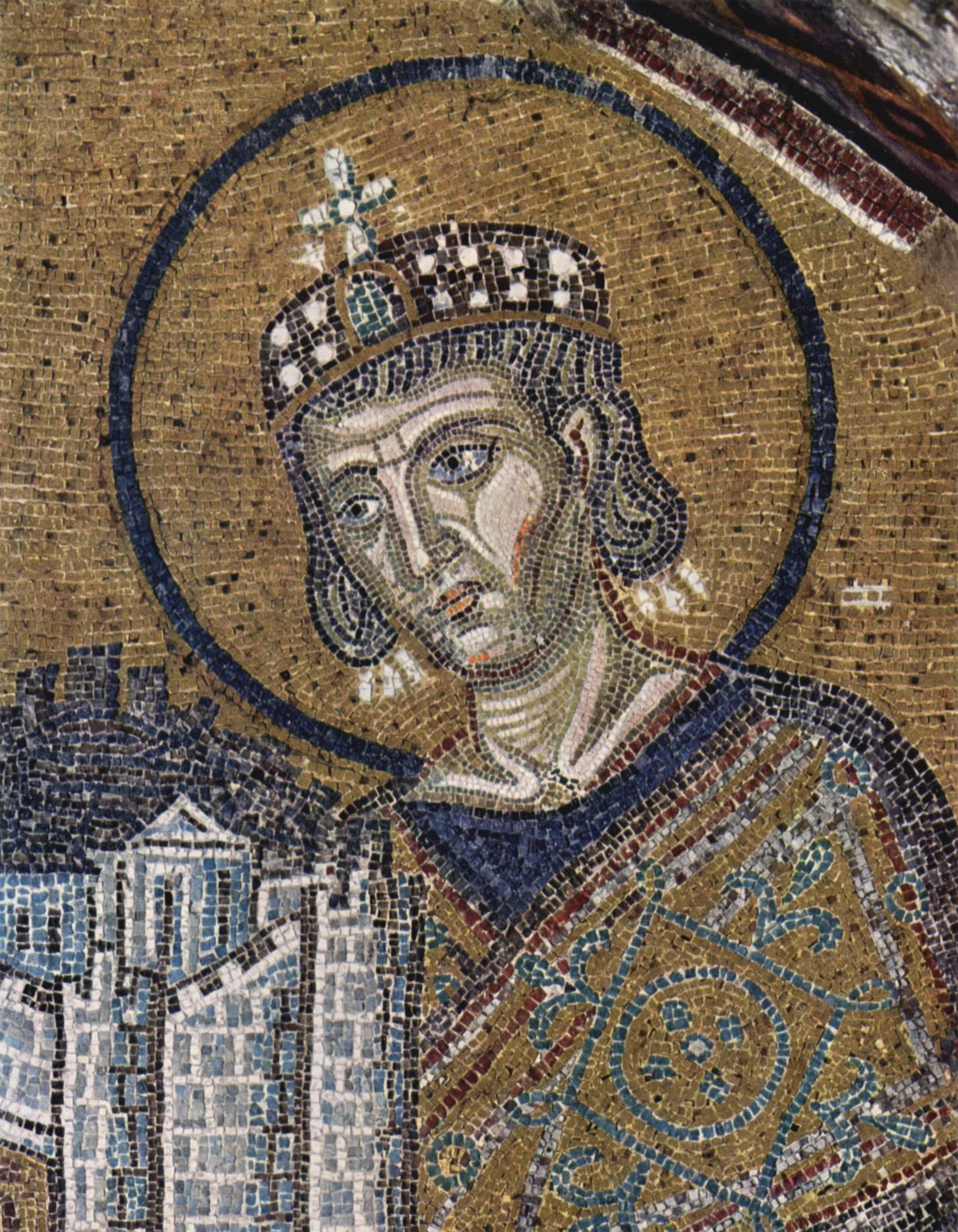
Emperor Constantine presents a representation of the city of Constantinople as tribute to an enthroned Mary and infant Jesus in this church mosaic. St Sophia, c. 1000.

The First Council of Nicaea, held in Nicaea in Bithynia (in present-day Turkey), convoked by Roman Emperor Constantine I in 325, was the first ecumenical conference of bishops of the Catholic Church (Catholic as in 'universal', not just Roman) and most significantly resulted in the first declaration of a uniform Christian doctrine.

The purpose of the council was to resolve disagreements in the Church of Alexandria over the nature of Jesus in relationship to the Father; in particular, whether Jesus was of the same substance as God the Father or merely of similar substance. Alexander of Alexandria and Athanasius took the first position; the popular presbyter Arius, from whom the term Arian controversy comes, took the second. The council decided against the Arians overwhelmingly (of the estimated 250–318 attendees, all but 2 voted against Arius). Another result of the council was an agreement on the date of the Christian Passover (Pascha in Greek; Easter in modern English), the most important feast of the ecclesiastical calendar. The council decided in favour of celebrating the resurrection on the first Sunday after the first full moon following the vernal equinox, independently of the Bible's Hebrew calendar, and authorized the Bishop of Alexandria (presumably using the Alexandrian calendar) to announce annually the exact date to his fellow bishops.

The council was historically significant because it was the first effort to attain consensus in the church through an assembly representing all of Christendom. With the creation of the Nicene Creed, a precedent was established for subsequent general councils to create a statement of belief and canons which were intended to become guidelines for doctrinal orthodoxy and a source of unity for the whole of Christendom – a momentous event in the history of the Church and subsequent history of Europe.

The council was opposed by the Arians, and Constantine tried to reconcile Arius with the Church. Even when Arius died in 336, one year before the death of Constantine, the controversy continued, with various separate groups espousing Arian sympathies in one way or another. In 359, a double council of Eastern and Western bishops affirmed a formula stating that the Father and the Son were similar in accord with the scriptures, the crowning victory for Arianism. The opponents of Arianism rallied, but in the First Council of Constantinople in 381 marked the final victory of Nicene orthodoxy within the empire, though Arianism had by then spread to the Germanic tribes, among whom it gradually disappeared after the conversion of the Franks to Catholicism in 496.

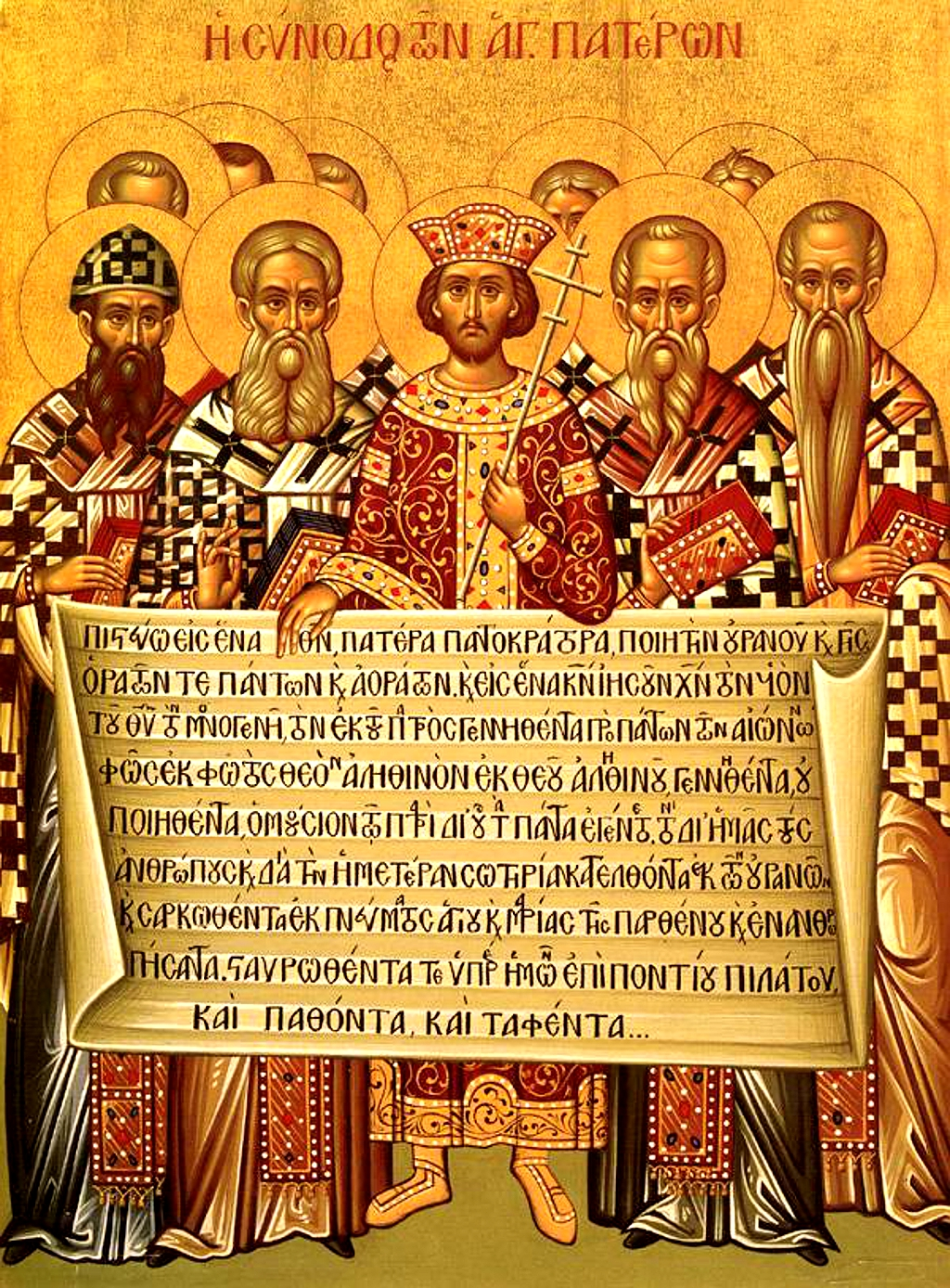
Icon depicting Emperor Constantine, center, accompanied by the Church Fathers of the 325 First Council of Nicaea, holding the Nicene Creed in its 381 form

=== First Council of Constantinople ===
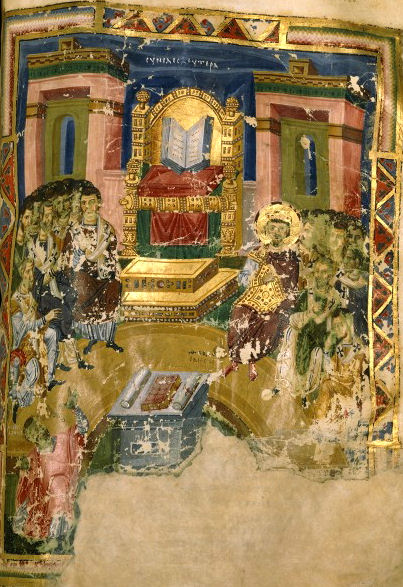
Early manuscript illustration of Council of Constantinople

The First Council of Constantinople approved the current form of the Nicene Creed as it is still used in the Eastern Orthodox Church and Oriental Orthodox churches. The creed, originally written in Greek, was subsequently translated in other languages. The form used by the Armenian Apostolic Church, which is part of Oriental Orthodoxy, has several additions to the original text. This fuller creed may have existed before the council and probably originated from the baptismal creed of Constantinople. Later, the Catholic Church in the west, added two additional Latin phrases ("Deum de Deo" and "Filioque"). The exact time, and origin, of these additions is disputed. However, they were formally accepted only in 1014.

The council also condemned Apollinarism, the teaching that there was no human mind or soul in Christ. It also granted Constantinople honorary precedence over all churches save Rome. The council did not include Western bishops or Roman legates, but it was accepted as ecumenical in the West.

== Church Fathers ==
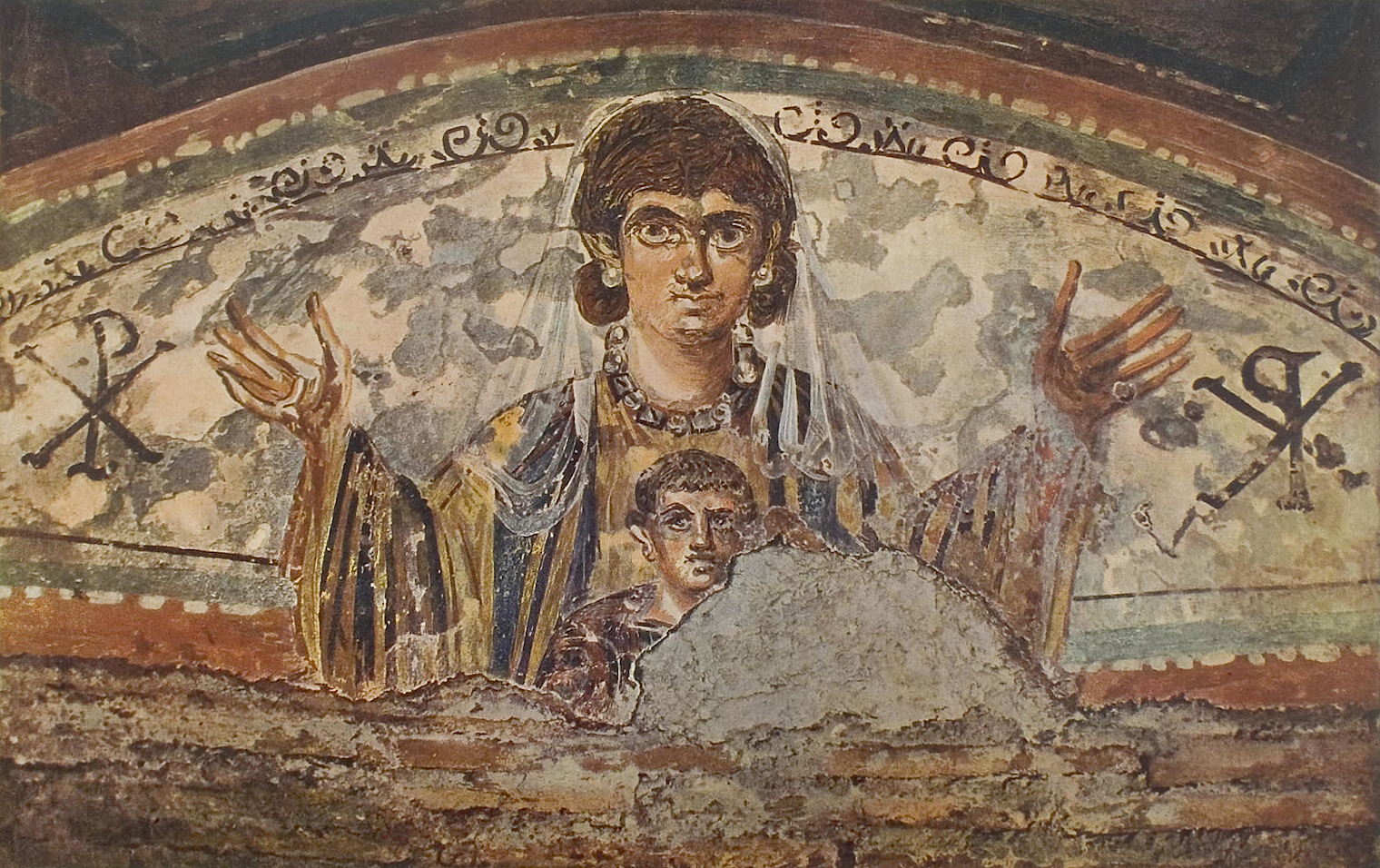
Virgin and Child. Wall painting from the early catacombs, Rome, 4th century.

The Church Fathers, Early Church Fathers, or Fathers of the Church are the early and influential theologians and writers in the Christian Church, particularly those of the first five centuries of Christian history. The term is used of writers and teachers of the Church, not necessarily saints. Teachers particularly are also known as doctors of the Church, although Athanasius called them men of little intellect.

=== Nicene and Post-Nicene Fathers ===
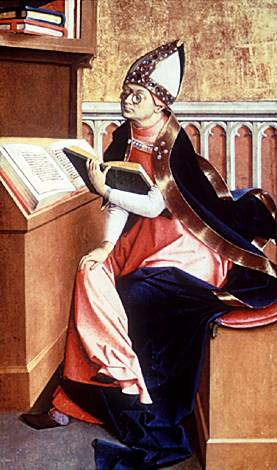
Augustine

Late Antique Christianity produced a great many renowned Church Fathers who wrote volumes of theological texts, including Augustine of Hippo, Gregory Nazianzus, Cyril of Jerusalem, Ambrose of Milan, Jerome, and others. Some, such as John Chrysostom and Athanasius, suffered exile, persecution, or martyrdom from heretical Byzantine emperors. Many of their writings are translated into English in the compilations of Nicene and Post-Nicene Fathers.

Influential texts and writers between 325 and c.500 include:

- Athanasius (298–373)
- The Cappadocian Fathers (late 4th century)
- Ambrose (c. 340–397)
- Chrysostom (347–407)

=== Greek Fathers ===
Those who wrote in Greek are called the Greek (Church) Fathers.

=== Athanasius of Alexandria ===
Athanasius of Alexandria was a theologian, Pope of Alexandria, and a noted Egyptian leader of the 4th century. He is best remembered for his role in the conflict with Arianism. At the First Council of Nicaea, Athanasius argued against the Arian doctrine that Christ is of a distinct substance from the Father.

=== John Chrysostom ===
John Chrysostom, archbishop of Constantinople, is known for his eloquence in preaching and public speaking, his denunciation of abuse of authority by both ecclesiastical and political leaders, the Divine Liturgy of St. John Chrysostom, and his ascetic sensibilities. After his death (or, according to some sources, during his life) he was given the Greek surname chrysostomos, meaning "golden mouthed", rendered in English as Chrysostom.

Chrysostom is known within Christianity chiefly as a preacher, theologian, and liturgist, particularly in the Eastern Orthodox Church. Outside the Christian tradition Chrysostom is noted for eight of his sermons which played a considerable part in the history of Christian antisemitism and were extensively used by the Nazis in their ideological campaign against the Jews.

=== Latin Fathers ===
Those fathers who wrote in Latin are called the Latin (Church) Fathers.

=== Ambrose of Milan ===
Ambrose of Milan was a bishop of Milan who became one of the most influential ecclesiastical figures of the 4th century. He is counted as one of the four original doctors of the Church.

== Monasticism ==
=== Desert Fathers ===
The Desert Fathers were early monastics living in the Egyptian desert; although they did not write as much, their influence was also great. Among them are St. Anthony the Great and St. Pachomius. A great number of their usually short sayings is collected in the Apophthegmata Patrum ("Sayings of the Desert Fathers").

=== Early Christian monasticism ===
The first efforts to create a proto-monastery were by Saint Macarius, who established individual groups of cells such as those at Kellia (founded in 328.) The intention was to bring together individual ascetics who, although pious, did not have the physical ability or skills to live a solitary existence in the desert . At Tabenna around 323, Saint Pachomius chose to mould his disciples into a more organized community in which the monks lived in individual huts or rooms (cellula in Latin) but worked, ate, and worshipped in shared space. Guidelines for daily life were created, and separate monasteries were created for men and women. This method of monastic organization is called cenobitic or "community-based." All the principal monastic orders are cenobitic in nature. In Catholic theology, this community-based living is considered superior because of the obedience practiced and the accountability offered. The head of a monastery came to be known by the word for "Father;" – in Syriac, Abba; in English, "Abbot."

Pachomius was called in to help organize others, and by one count by the time he died in 346 there were thought to be 3,000 such communities dotting Egypt, especially the Thebaid. Within the span of the next generation this number increased to 7,000. From there monasticism quickly spread out first to Palestine and the Judean Desert, Syria, North Africa and eventually the rest of the Roman Empire.

=== Eastern monasticism ===
Analavos worn by Eastern Orthodox Schema-Monks

Orthodox monasticism does not have religious orders as in the West, so there are no formal monastic rules; rather, each monk and nun is encouraged to read all of the Holy Fathers and emulate their virtues. There is also no division between the "active" and "contemplative" life. Orthodox monastic life embraces both active and contemplative aspects.

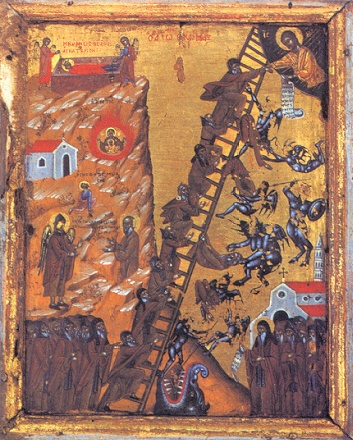
Icon depicting souls' ascent to heaven after death

=== Gaul ===
The earliest phases of monasticism in Western Europe involved figures like Martin of Tours, who after serving in the Roman legions converted to Christianity and established a hermitage near Milan, then moved on to Poitiers where he gathered a community around his hermitage. He was called to become Bishop of Tours in 372, where he established a monastery at Marmoutiers on the opposite bank of the Loire River, a few miles upstream from the city. His monastery was laid out as a colony of hermits rather than as a single integrated community.

John Cassian began his monastic career at a monastery in Palestine and Egypt around 385 to study monastic practice there. In Egypt he had been attracted to the isolated life of hermits, which he considered the highest form of monasticism, yet the monasteries he founded were all organized monastic communities. About 410 he established two monasteries near Marseille, one for men, one for women. In time these attracted a total of 5,000 monks and nuns. Most significant for the future development of monasticism were Cassian's Institutes, which provided a guide for monastic life and his Conferences, a collection of spiritual reflections.

Honoratus of Marseille was a wealthy Gallo-Roman aristocrat, who after a pilgrimage to Egypt, founded the Monastery of Lérins, on an island lying off the modern city of Cannes. The monastery combined a community with isolated hermitages where older, spiritually-proven monks could live in isolation.

One Roman reaction to monasticism was expressed in the description of Lérins by Rutilius Namatianus, who served as prefect of Rome in 414:

A filthy island filled by men who flee the light.
Monks they call themselves, using a Greek name.
Because they will to live alone, unseen by man.
Fortune's gifts they fear, dreading their harm:
Mad folly of a demented brain,
That cannot suffer good, for fear of ill.

Lérins became, in time, a center of monastic culture and learning, and many later monks and bishops would pass through Lérins in the early stages of their career. Honoratus was called to be Bishop of Arles and was succeeded in that post by another monk from Lérins. Lérins was aristocratic in character, as was its founder, and was closely tied to urban bishoprics.

== Defining scripture ==
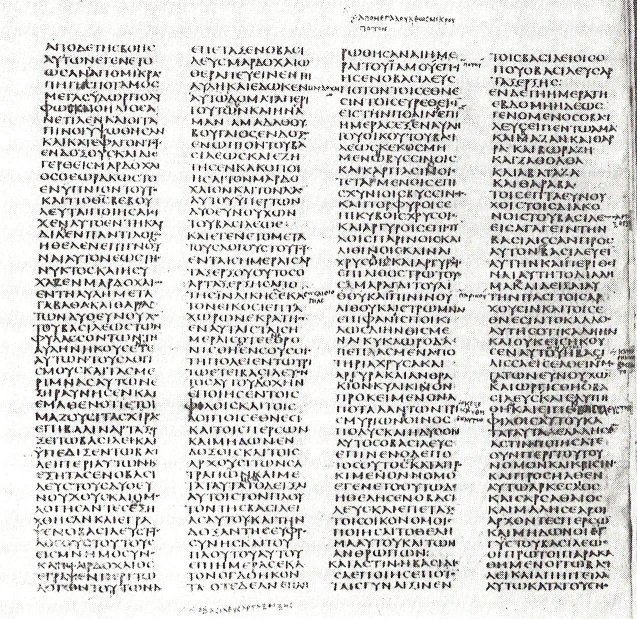
A page from Codex Sinaiticus, א, showing text from Esther. Written c. 330–360, it is one of the earliest and most important Biblical manuscripts. Now at the British Library and other locations, the manuscript was discovered at Saint Catherine's Monastery, in 1844.

In 331, Constantine I commissioned Eusebius to deliver fifty Christian Bibles for the Church of Constantinople. Athanasius (Apol. Const. 4) recorded Alexandrian scribes around 340 preparing Bibles. Little else is known, though there is plenty of speculation. For example, it is speculated that this may have provided motivation for canon lists, and that Codex Sinaiticus and Codex Vaticanus are examples of these Bibles. Together with the Peshitta and Codex Alexandrinus, these are the earliest extant Christian Bibles.

In order to form a New Testament canon of uniquely Christian works, proto-orthodox Christians went through a process that was complete in the West by the beginning of the fifth century. Athanasius, bishop of Alexandria, Egypt, in his Easter letter of 367, which was approved at the Quinisext Council, listed the same twenty-seven New Testament books as found in the Canon of Trent. The first council that accepted the present canon of the New Testament may have been the Synod of Hippo Regius in North Africa in 393; the acts of this council, however, are lost. A brief summary of the acts was read at and accepted by the Council of Carthage (397) and Council of Carthage (419).

== Bishops ==
After legalisation in 313, the Church inside the Roman Empire adopted the same organisational boundaries as the empire: geographical provinces, called dioceses, corresponding to imperial governmental territorial division. The bishops, who were located in major urban centres as per pre-legalisation tradition, thus oversaw each diocese as Metropolitan bishops. The bishop's location was his "seat", or "see." The prestige of important Christian centers depended in part on their apostolic founders, from whom the bishops were therefore the spiritual successors according to the doctrine of Apostolic succession.

Constantine erected a new capital at Byzantium, a strategically placed city on the Bosporus. He renamed his new capital Nova Roma ("New Rome"), but the city would become known as Constantinople. The Second Ecumenical Council, held at the new capital in 381, elevated the see of Constantinople to a position ahead of the other chief metropolitan sees, except that of Rome. Mentioning in particular the provinces of Asia, Pontus and Thrace, it decreed that the synod of each province should manage the ecclesiastical affairs of that province alone, except for the privileges already recognized for Alexandria and Antioch.

== Tensions between the East and the West ==
The divisions in Christian unity which led to the East–West Schism started to become evident as early as the 4th century. Although 1054 is the date usually given for the beginning of the Great Schism, there is, in fact, no specific date on which the schism occurred.

The events leading to schism were not exclusively theological in nature. Cultural, political, and linguistic differences were often mixed with the theological. Unlike the Coptics or Armenians who broke from the Church in the 5th century and established ethnic churches at the cost of their universality and catholicity, the eastern and western parts of the Church remained loyal to the faith and authority of the seven ecumenical councils. They were united, by virtue of their common faith and tradition, in one Church.

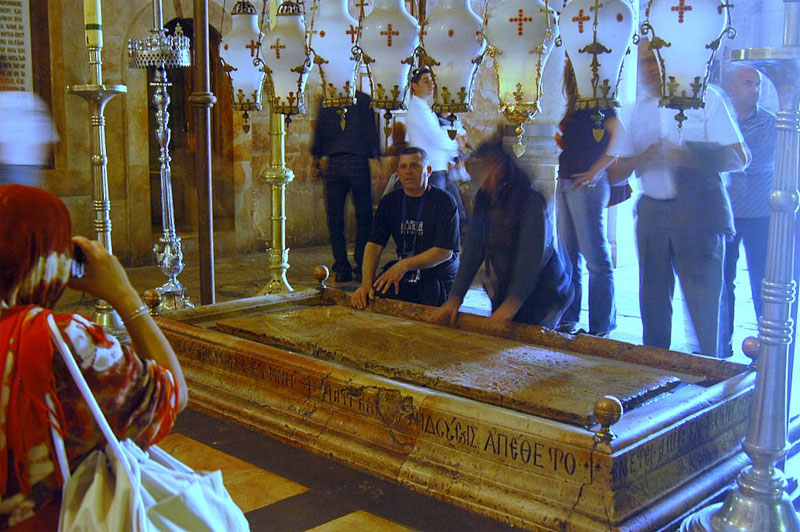
The Stone of the Anointing, believed to be the place where Jesus' body was prepared for burial. It is the 13th Station of the Cross.

The Orthodox Patriarch of Jerusalem and the ecclesiastics of the Orthodox church are based in the ancient Church of the Holy Sepulchre constructed in 335 AD.

Disunion in the Roman Empire further contributed to disunion in the Church. Emperor Diocletian divided the administration of the eastern and western portions of the empire in the early 4th century, though subsequent leaders (including Constantine) aspired to and sometimes gained control of both regions. Theodosius I, who established Christianity as the official religion of the Roman Empire, died in 395 and was the last emperor to rule over a united Roman Empire; following his death, the division into western and eastern halves, each under its own emperor, became permanent. By the end of the 5th century, the Western Roman Empire had been overrun by the Germanic tribes, while the Eastern Roman Empire (known also as the Byzantine Empire) continued to thrive. Thus, the political unity of the Roman Empire was the first to fall.

In the West, the collapse of civil government left the Church practically in charge in many areas, and bishops took to administering secular cities and domains. When royal and imperial rule reestablished itself, it had to contend with power wielded independently by the Church. In the East, however, imperial and, later, Islamic rule dominated the Eastern bishops of Byzantium. Whereas the Orthodox regions that were predominantly Slavic experienced period foreign dominance as well as period without infrastructure (see the Tatars and Russia).

=== Rome ===
In the 4th century when the Roman emperors were trying to control the Church, theological questions were running rampant throughout the Roman Empire. The influence of Greek speculative thought on Christian thinking led to all sorts of divergent and conflicting opinions. Christ's commandment to love others as He loved seemed to have been lost in the intellectual abstractions of the time. Theology was also used as a weapon against opponent bishops, since being branded a heretic was the only sure way for a bishop to be removed by other bishops.

After Constantine built Constantinople, the centre of the empire was recognised to have shifted to the eastern Mediterranean. Rome lost the Senate to Constantinople and lost its status and gravitas as imperial capital. The bishops of Rome sent letters which, though largely ineffectual, provided historical precedents which were used by later supporters of papal primacy. These letters were known as 'decretals' from at least the time of Siricius (384–399) to Leo I provided general guidelines to follow which later would become incorporated into canon law.

== Spread of Christianity ==
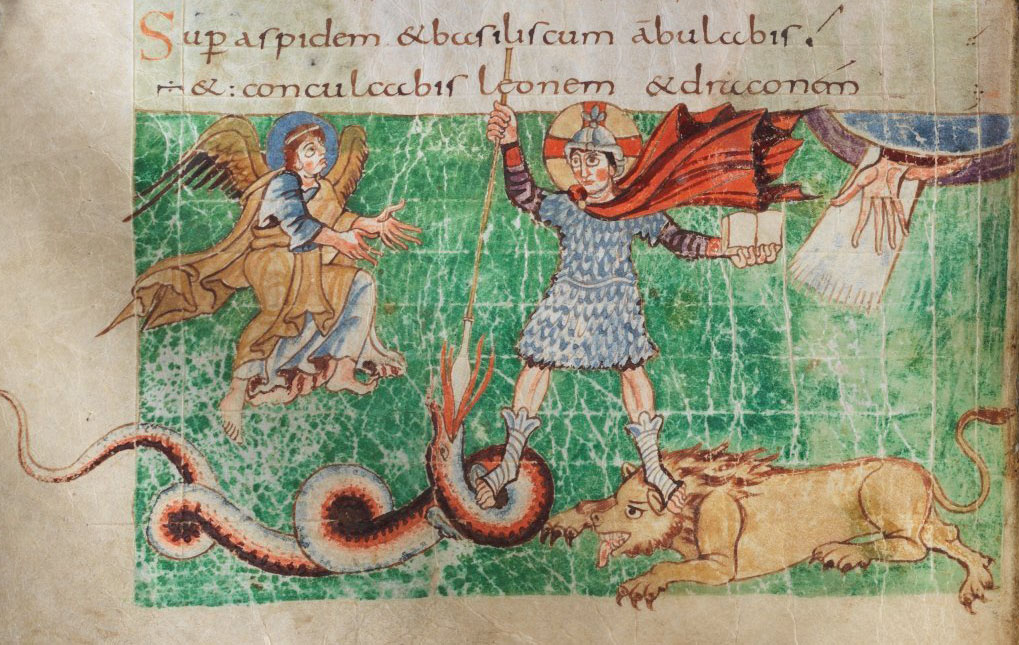
9th-century depiction of Christ as a heroic warrior (Stuttgart Psalter, fol. 23, illustration of Psalm 91:13)

In the 4th century, the early process of Christianization of the various Germanic peoples was partly facilitated by the prestige of the Christian Roman Empire amongst European pagans. Until the decline of the Roman Empire, the Germanic tribes who had migrated there (with the exceptions of the Saxons, Franks, and Lombards) had converted to Christianity. Many of them, notably the Goths and Vandals, adopted Arianism instead of the Trinitarian beliefs that came to dominate the Roman Imperial Church. The gradual rise of Germanic Christianity was voluntary, particularly amongst groups associated with the Roman Empire.

Wulfila or Ulfilas was the son or grandson of Christian captives from Sadagolthina in Cappadocia. In 337 or 341, Wulfila became the first bishop of the (Christian) Goths. By 348, one of the pagan Gothic kings began persecuting the Christian Goths, and Wulfila and many other Christian Goths fled to Moesia Secunda (in modern Bulgaria) in the Roman Empire. Other Christians, including Wereka, Batwin, and Saba, died in later persecutions.

Between 348 and 383, Wulfila translated the Bible into the Gothic language. Thus some Arian Christians in the west used the vernacular languages, in this case including Gothic and Latin, for services, as did Christians in the eastern Roman provinces, while most Christians in the western provinces used Latin.

=== Christianity outside the Roman Empire ===
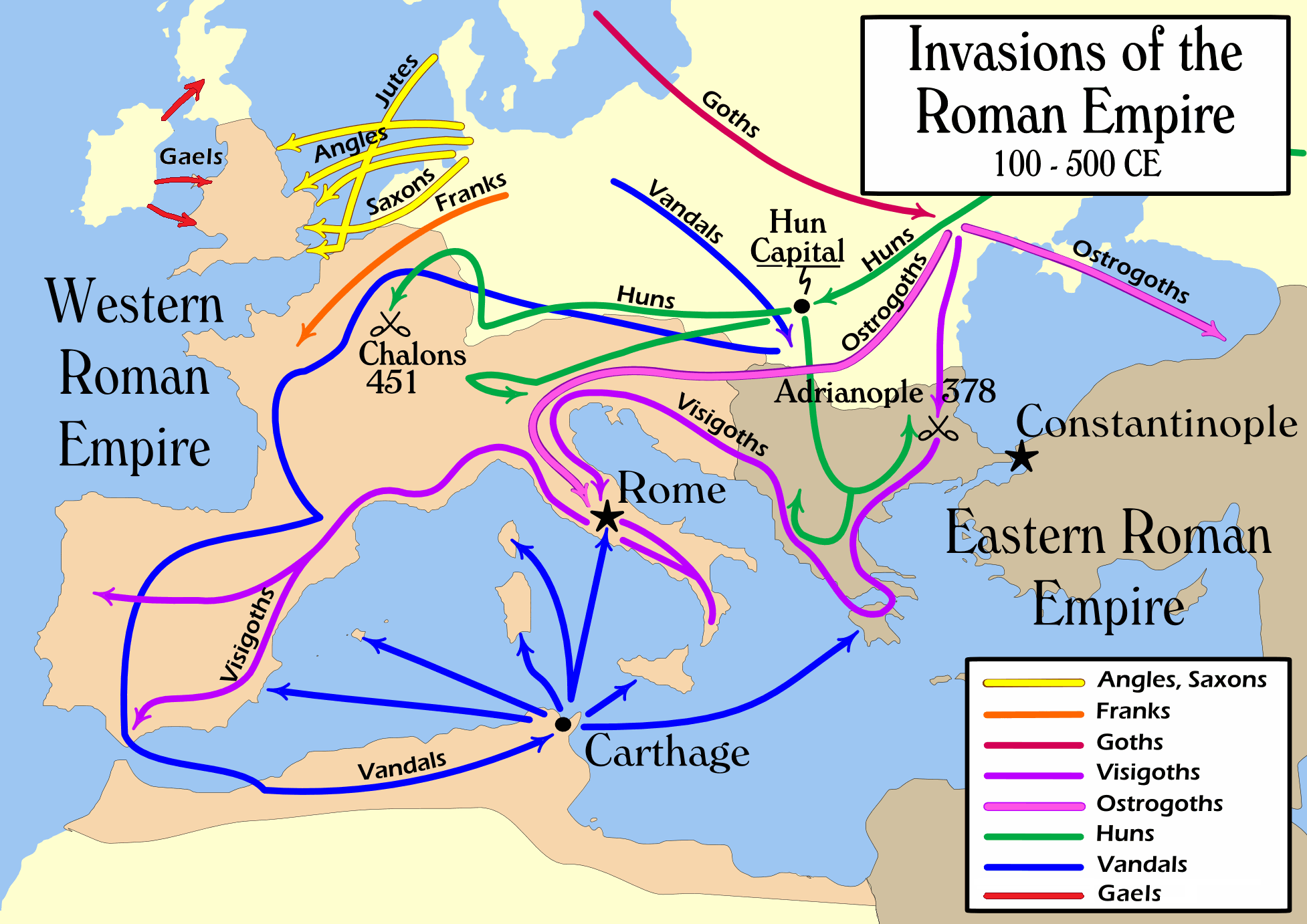
2nd to 5th century simplified migrations. See also map of the world in 820 AD.

The Armenian, Georgian and Ethiopian churches are the only instances of imposition of Christianity by sovereign rulers predating the council of Nicaea. Conversions happened among the Grecian-Roman-Celtic populations over centuries, mostly among its urban population and only spread to rural populations in much later centuries. Consequently, while the initial converts were found among the Jewish populations, the development of the Orthodox Church as an aspect of State society occurred through the co-option of State Religion into the ethos of Christianity, and only then was conversion of the large rural population accomplished.

The Germanic migrations of the 5th century were triggered by the destruction of the Gothic kingdoms by the Huns in 372–375.

=== Great persecution ===
The great persecution fell upon the Christians in Persia about 340. Though the religious motives were never unrelated, the primary cause of the persecution was political. When Rome became Christian, its old enemy turned anti-Christian. For the first three centuries after Christ it was in the West that Christians were persecuted. The Parthians were too religiously tolerant to persecute, and their less tolerant Sassanian successors on the throne were too busy fighting Rome, so Persian emperors were inclined to regard them as friends of Persia.

It was about 315 that an ill-advised letter from Christian Emperor Constantine to his Persian counterpart Shapur II probably triggered the beginnings of an ominous change in the Persian attitude toward Christians. Constantine believed he was writing to help his fellow believers in Persia but succeeded only in exposing them. He wrote to the young shah:

"I rejoice to hear that the fairest provinces of Persia are adorned with...Christians...Since you are so powerful and pious, I commend them to your care, and leave them in your protection".

It was enough to make any Persian ruler conditioned by 300 years of war with Rome suspicious of the emergence of a fifth column. Any lingering doubts must have been dispelled when about twenty years later when Constantine began to gather his forces for war in the East. Eusebius records that Roman bishops were prepared to accompany their emperor to "battle with him and for him by prayers to God whom all victory proceeds". And across the border in Persian territory the forthright Persian preacher Aphrahat recklessly predicted on the basis of his reading of Old testament prophecy that Rome would defeat Persia.

When the persecutions began shortly thereafter, the first accusation brought against the Christians was that they were aiding the Roman enemy. The shah Shapur II's response was to order a double taxation on Christians and to hold the bishop responsible for collecting it. He knew they were poor and that the bishop would be hard-pressed to find the money. Bishop Simon refused to be intimidated. He branded the tax as unjust and declared, "I am no tax collector but a shepherd of the Lord's flock."

A second decree ordered the destruction of churches and the execution of clergy who refused to participate in the national worship of the sun. Bishop Simon was seized and brought before the shah and was offered gifts to make a token obeisance to the sun, and when he refused, they cunningly tempted him with the promise that if he alone would apostatize his people would not be harmed, but that if he refused he would be condemning not just the church leaders but all Christians to destruction. At that, the Christians rose up and refused to accept such a deliverance as shameful. In 344, Simon was led outside the city of Susa along with a large number of Christian clergy. Five bishops and one hundred priests were beheaded before his eyes, and lastly he was put to death.

Sometime before the death of Shapur II in 379, the intensity of the persecution slackened. Tradition calls it a Forty-Year Persecution, lasting from 339–379 and ending only with Shapur's death. When at last the years of suffering ended around 401, the historian Sozomen, who lived nearby, wrote that the multitude of martyrs had been "beyond enumeration". One estimate is that as many as 190,000 Persian Christians died in the terror.

=== Conditioning factors of missionary expansion ===
Several important factors help to explain the extensive growth in the Church of the East during the first twelve hundred years of the Christian era. Geographically, and possibly even numerically, the expansion of this church outstripped that of the church in the West in the early centuries. The outstanding key to understanding this expansion is the active participation of the laymen – the involvement of a large percentage of the church's believers in missionary evangelism.

Persecution strengthened and spread the Christian movement in the East. A great influx of Christian refugees from the Roman persecutions of the first two centuries gave vigour to the Mesopotamian church. The persecutions in Persia caused refugees to escape as far as Arabia, India, and other Central Asian countries.

Christianity penetrated Arabia from numerous points on its periphery. Northeastern Arabia flourished from the end of the 3rd to the end of the 6th and was apparently evangelized by Christians from the Tigris-Euphrates Valley in the 4th century. The kingdom of Ghassan on the northwest frontier was also a sphere of missionary activity. In fact, by 500 many churches were also in existence along the Arabian shore of the Persian Gulf and in Oman, all connected with the Church of the East in the Persian Empire. Arabian bishops were found among those in attendance at important church councils in Mesopotamia.

=== Central Asia ===
The agents of missionary expansion in central Asia and the Far East were not only monks and clergy trained in the mesopotamian monastic schools, but also in many cases Christian merchants and artisans, often with considerable biblical training. They frequently found employment among people less advanced in education, serving in government offices and as teachers and secretaries and more advanced medical care. They also helped to solve the problem of illiteracy by inventing simplified alphabets based on the Syriac language.

Persecution often thrust Christians forth into new and unevangelized lands to find refuge. The dissemination of the gospel by largely Syriac-using people had its advantages, but it was also a hindrance to indigenizing the church in the new areas. Because Syriac never became dominant, competition from ethnic religions was an issue. For these reasons of political vicissitude, in later centuries Christianity suffered an almost total eclipse in Asia until the modern period. The golden age of early missions in central Asia extended from the end of the fourth to the latter part of the 9th century.

Christianity had an early and extensive dissemination throughout the vast territory north of Persia and west and East of the Oxus River. Cities like Merv, Herat and Samarkand had bishops and later became metropolitanates. Christians were found among the Hephthalite Huns from the 5th century, and the Mesopotamian patriarch assigned two bishops (John of Resh-aina and Thomas the Tanner) to both peoples, with the result that many were baptized. They also devised and taught a written language for the Huns and with the help of an Armenian bishop, taught also agricultural methods and skills.

== Timeline ==
4th century timeline
- 296–304 Pope Marcellinus, offered pagan sacrifices for Diocletian
- 301 – Armenia accepts Christianity as state religion
- 303 Saint George, patron saint of England, and other states
- 303–312 Diocletian's Massacre of Christians, included burning of scriptures (EH 8.2)
- 304? Victorinus, bishop of Pettau
- 304? Pope Marcellinus, having repented from his previous defection, suffered martyrdom with several companions.
- 306 – The first bishop of Nisibis is ordained
- 306 Synod of Elvira, prohibited relations between Christians and Jews
- 290–345? St Pachomius, founder of Christian monasticism
- 310 Maxentius deports Pope Eusebius and Heraclius to Sicily (relapse controversy)
- 312 Lucian of Antioch, founded School of Antioch, martyred
- 312 Vision of Constantine: while gazing into the sun he saw a cross with the words by this sign conquer, see also Labarum, he was later called the 13th Apostle and Equal-to-apostles
- 313 Edict of Milan, Constantine and Licinius end persecution, establish toleration of Christianity
- 313? Lateran Palace given to Pope Miltiades for residence by Constantine
- 313 – Emperor Constantine issues Edict of Milan, legalizing Christianity in the Roman Empire
- 314 Council of Arles, called by Constantine against Donatist schism
- 314 Arsacid Armenia first to adopt Christianity as state religion (mainstream date; traditionally 301)
- 314 – Tiridates III of Armenia and King Urnayr of Caucasian Albania converted by Gregory the Illuminator
- 317? Lactantius
- 321 Constantine decreed Sunday as state "day of rest" (CJ3.12.2), see also Sol Invictus
- 251–424? Synods of Carthage
- 314–340? Eusebius, bishop of Caesarea, church historian, cited Caesarean text-type, wrote Ecclesiastical History in 325
- 325 The First Council of Nicaea
- 325 The Kingdom of Aksum (Modern Ethiopia) declares Christianity as the official state Religion becoming the second country to do so
- 325 Church of the Nativity in Bethlehem, ordered by Constantine
- 326, November 18 Pope Sylvester I consecrates the Basilica of St. Peter built by Constantine the Great over the tomb of the Apostle.
- 327 – Georgian King Mirian III of Iberia converted by Nino
- 330 – Ethiopian King Ezana of Axum makes Christianity an official religion
- 330 Old Church of the Holy Apostles, dedicated by Constantine
- 330, May 11: Constantinople solemly inaugurated. Constantine moves the capital of the Roman Empire to Byzantium, renaming it New Rome
- 331 Constantine commissioned Eusebius to deliver 50 Bibles for the Church of Constantinople
- 332 – Two young Roman Christians, Frumentius and Aedesius, are the sole survivors of a ship destroyed in the Red Sea due to tensions between Rome and Aksum. They are taken as slaves to the Ethiopian capital of Axum to serve in the royal court.
- 334 – The first bishop is ordained for Merv / Transoxiana (area of modern-day Uzbekistan, Tajikistan, Turkmenistan and southwest Kazakhstan)
- 335 Council in Jerusalem, reversed Nicaea's condemnation of Arius, consecrated Jerusalem Church of the Holy Sepulchre
- 337 Mirian III of Georgia, third to adopt Christianity as state religion
- 337, May 22: Constantine the Great dies. Baptized shortly prior to his death
- 337 – Emperor Constantine baptized shortly before his death
- 341–379 Shapur II's persecution of Persian Christians
- 341 – Ulfilas begins work with the Goths in present-day Romania
- 343? Council of Sardica
- 328–373 Athanasius, bishop of Alexandria, first cite of modern 27 book New Testament canon
- 350? Julius Firmicus Maternus
- 350? Codex Sinaiticus(א), Codex Vaticanus(B): earliest Christian Bibles, Alexandrian text-type
- 350? Ulfilas, Arian, apostle to the Goths, translated Greek NT to Gothic
- 350? Comma Johanneum 1Jn5:7b-8a(KJV)
- 350? Aëtius, Arian, "Syntagmation": "God is agennetos (unbegotten)", founder of Anomoeanism
- 350? School of Nisibis founded
- 350 – Bible is translated into Saidic, an Egyptian language
- 354 – Theophilus "the Indian" reports visiting Christians in India ; Philostorgius mentions a community of Christians on the Socotra islands, south of Yemen in the Arabian Sea
- 357 Third Council of Sirmium, issued so-called Blasphemy of Sirmium or Seventh Arian Confession, called high point of Arianism
- 359 Council of Rimini, Dated Creed (Acacians)
- 360 Julian the Apostate becomes the last non-Christian Roman Emperor.
- 364 – Conversion of Vandals to Christianity begins during reign of Emperor Valens
- 353–367 Hilary, bishop of Poitiers
- 355–365 Antipope Felix II, Arian, supported by Constantius II, consecrated by Acacius of Caesarea
- 363–364 Council of Laodicea, canon 29 decreed anathema for Christians who rest on the Sabbath, disputed canon 60 named 26 NT books (excluded Revelation)
- 366–367 Antipope Ursicinus, rival to Pope Damasus I
- 370? Doctrine of Addai at Edessa proclaims 17 book NT canon using Diatessaron (instead of the 4 Gospels) + Acts + 15 Pauline Epistles (inc. 3 Corinthians) Syriac Orthodox Church
- 370 – Wulfila translates the Bible into Gothic, the first Bible translation done specifically for missionary purposes
- 378 – Jerome writes, "From India to Britain, all nations resound with the death and resurrection of Christ"
- 367–403 Epiphanius, bishop of Salamis, wrote Panarion against heresies
- 370–379 Basil the Great, Bishop of Caesarea
- 372–394 Gregory, Bishop Of Nyssa
- 373 Ephrem the Syrian, cited Western Acts
- 374–397 Ambrose, bishop & governor of Milan
- 375–395 Ausonius, Christian governor of Gaul
- 379–381 Gregory Nazianzus, Bishop of Constantinople
- 380, February 27: Emperor Theodosius I issues the edict De Fide Catolica declaring Christianity as the official state religion of the Roman Empire
- 380, November 24: Emperor Theodosius I is baptised.
- 380 Roman Emperor Theodosius I makes Christianity the official state religion
- 381 First Council of Constantinople, 2nd ecumenical, Jesus had true human soul, Nicene Creed of 381
- 382 Council of Rome under Pope Damasus I sets the Biblical Canon, listing the inspired books of the Old Testament and the New Testament (disputed)
- 382 – Jerome is commissioned to translate the Gospels (and subsequently the whole Bible) into Latin (Price, p. 78)
- 383? Frumentius, Apostle of Ethiopia
- 385 Priscillian, first heretic to be executed?
- 386 – Augustine of Hippo converted
- 390? Apollinaris, bishop of Laodicea, believed Jesus had human body but divine spirit
- 390 – Nestorian missionary Abdyeshu (or Abdisho) builds a monastery on the island of Bahrain
- 391: The Theodosian decrees outlaw most pagan rituals still practiced in Rome.
- 397 – Ninian evangelizes the Southern Picts of Scotland; three missionaries sent to the mountaineers in the Trento region of northern Italy are martyred
- 397? Saint Ninian evangelizes Picts in Scotland
- 400 – Hayyan begins proclaiming gospel in Yemen after having been converted in Hirta on the Persian border; in starting a school for native Gothic evangelists, John Chrysostom writes, "'Go and make disciples of all nations' was not said for the Apostles only, but for us also"
- 400: Jerome's Vulgate Latin edition and translation of the Bible is published.
- 400? Ethiopic Bible: in Ge'ez, 81 books, standard Ethiopian Orthodox Bible
- 400? Peshitta Bible in Syriac (Aramaic), Syr(p), OT + 22 NT, excludes: 2Pt, 2–3Jn, Jude, Rev; standard Syriac Orthodox Church Bible

== See also ==
- History of Christianity
- History of the Roman Catholic Church
- History of the Eastern Orthodox Church
- History of Christian theology
- Christian martyrs
- History of Oriental Orthodoxy
- Ante-Nicene Period
- Church Fathers
- List of Church Fathers
- Christian monasticism
- Patristics
- Great Church
- Development of the New Testament canon
- Christianization
- History of Calvinist-Arminian debate
- Timeline of Christianity
- Timeline of Christian missions
- Timeline of the Roman Catholic Church
- Chronological list of saints in the 4th century
- Chronological list of Christian theologians in the 4th century

== Notes ==
History of Christianity: Late ancient Christianity
Preceded by: Christianity in the 3rd century / Fourth century / Followed by: Christianity in the 5th century
BC	C1	C2	C3	C4	C5	C6	C7	C8	C9	C10
C11	C12	C13	C14	C15	C16	C17	C18	C19	C20	C21
