= De fluviis =

2nd-century work by Pseudo-Plutarch

De fluviīs (Latin for "concerning rivers"), also called Dē fluviōrum et montium nōminibus et dē iīs quae in illīs inveniuntur ("concerning the names of rivers and mountains and those things which are found in them") or the Greek Περὶ ποταμῶν καὶ ὀρῶν ἐπωνυμίας, is a Greek text by Pseudo-Plutarch written during the 2nd century CE. It discusses twenty-five rivers in Greece, Asia Minor, India, Gaul, Egypt, Scythia, and Armenia. The chapters typically start with a myth about the river, include information about local flora and stones, and end with details about a nearby mountain.

Scholars today classify it as paradoxography, or even a parody of paradoxography.

== The work ==
Notably, Pseudo-Plutarch describes 22 of the 25 rivers as deriving their names from people who committed suicide in them. Six of the rivers were renamed twice due to suicide. Several of the mountains are also said to have gotten their names from suicides.

Most of the plants and stones described have mystical qualities to them, from warding off spirits and gods, to causing and healing madness, to exposing liars and thieves.

Sources are cited throughout the book including the Treatise of Rivers by Achelaus, the Second Book of Rivers by Sostratus, the Third Book of Mountains by Dercyllus, the Third Book of Plants by Ctesiphon, and the History of Boeotia by Leo of Byzantium. A full list is given below.

== Authorship ==
The work is considered pseudepigrapha, meaning written by someone other than the attributed author, Plutarch. It is only preserved by the 9th century codex Palatinus gr. Heidelbergensis 398, which includes a marginal note stating, "This is pseudepigraphic, for the intellectual level and diction are far from the genius of Plutarch. Unless he might be some other Plutarch."

== Rivers ==
River	Location	Named for Someone Who Threw Themselves in the River	Mountains	Plants	Stones/Other	Reference
Hydaspes	India	Yes	Elephas	[river] "like a heliotrope" used to prevent sunburn	[river] precious stone called "lychnis" which is found during the waxing moon while pipers are piping	
Ismenus	Boeotia	Yes	Cithaeron	—	—	
Hebrus	Thrace	Yes	Pangaeus	[river] "not unlike origanumn" burned and the smoke inhaled until they fall asleep; [mountain] called "harp" because it grew from the blood of Orpheus; sounds like a harp when played during sacrifices to Bacchus	—	
Ganges	India	Yes	Anatole	[river] "resembling bugloss" the juice of which is sprinkled on tiger's dens, which causes the tigers to sleep to death	—	
Phasis	Scythia	Yes	Caucasus	[river] reed called "leucophyllus" which when scattered on the floor keeps wives chaste and gets evildoers to confess their deeds and intentions; [mountain] called "Prometheus" which Medea used to protect Jason from her father	—	
Arar	Gallia Celtica	Yes	Lugdunum	—	[river] fish called "Clupaea" which changes colors with the moon, and which has a stone in its head that can cure "quartan agues"	
Pactolus	Lydia	Yes, twice	Tmolus	[river] purple flower called "chrysopolis" used to test the purity of gold	[river] stone called "preserver of the fields" which causes thieves to break their own necks; [mountain] pumice-like stone which changes color 4 times a day, and only virgins can see; it protects them from rape	
Lycormas	Aetolia	Yes	Myenus	[river] called "sarissa" which helps people with poor vision; [mountain] flower called the "white violet" which gives a person the power to kill their step-mother by speaking it	—	
Maeander	Asia (Turkey)	Yes	Sipylus	—	[river] stone called "sophron" that makes a person go mad and murder their family; [mountain] stone like a cylinder that obedient children take to the temple of Rhea	
Marsyas	Phrygia	No	Berecyntus	[river] called "the pipe" which sounds like a pipe in the wind	[mountain] a stone called "machaera" which causes a person to go mad if found during the mysteries of Rhea	
Strymon	Thrace	Yes	Rhodope and Haemus	—	[river] stone called "pausilypus" which eases grief; [mountain] black, humanoid stones called "philadelphi" which waste away when separated	
Sagaris	Phrygia	Yes	Ballenaeus	—	[river] stone called "autoglyphus" or "self-engraved" with the Mother of the Gods naturally carved on it; [river] stone called "aster" which shines at midnight in the end of autumn	
Scamander	Troas	Yes	Ida (formerly Gargarus)	[river] herb with rattling seedpods that repel apparitions and gods	[mountain] stone called "cryphius" which can only be found during the mystery rituals of a god	
Tanais	Scythia	Yes	Brixaba	[river] called "halinda" used to withstand cold; [mountain] called "phryxa" or "hating the wicked" which protects sons from their step-mothers	[river] a crystal which causes the bearer to be elected king upon the king's death	
Thermodon	Scythia	Probably	Text of codex incomplete	—	—	
Nile	Egypt	Yes, twice	Argyllus	—	[river] stone like a bean that stops dogs barking and drives out evil spirits; [river] stone called "kolletes" used to build retaining walls	
Eurotas	Laconia	Yes, twice	Taygetus	[mountain] called "Charisia" which women wear to increase male desire for them	[river] stone called "thrasydeilos, or rash and timorous" which jumps up at a trumpet sound, but sinks on hearing the name Athenians	
Inachus	Argos	Yes, twice	Mycenae, Apesantus, Coccygium, and Athenaeum	[river] called "cynura" used to cause abortions; [river] called "selene" used to ward off biting and stinging insects; [mountain] tree called "paliurus" which snares any bird except the cuckoo; [mountain] root called "Adrastea" which causes women to go mad	[river] stone like beryl which causes liars' hands to blacken; [mountain] crow-colored stone called "corybas" which wards against apparitions	
Alpheus	Arcadia	Yes, twice	Cronium	[river] called "cenchritis" which cures madness	[mountain] stone called "the cylinder" which rolls down whenever there's lightning	
Euphrates	Parthia	Yes, twice	Drimylus	[river] called "axalla" which cures fits of "quartan-ague"	[river] stone called "aetites" which allows for nearly painless childbirth; [mountain] precious stone like a "sardonyx"	
Caicus	Mysia	Yes	Teuthras	[river] "a sort of poppy" which grows stones like harps that are thrown into a field, and if they fly away, a bounteous harvest is coming; [river] "elipharmacus" which stops bleeding	[mountain] stone called "the resister" which can cure leprosy when mixed with wine	
Achelous	Aetolia	Yes	Calydon	[river] called "zaclon" which can remove the alcohol from wine; [mountain] called "myops" which causes a person to lose sight	[river] a stone called "linurgus" which turns linen white	
Araxes	Armenia	Yes	Diorphus	[river] called "araxa" which means "virgin hater" because if found by a virgin, they will bleed and die; [mountain] tree like a "pomegranate-tree" with fruit that tastes like grapes; if you don't name Mars, the fruit will turn green again in your hand	[river] black stone called "sicyonus" which can be used as proxy when human sacrifice is required	
Tigris	Armenia	No	Gauran	[mountain] "like to wild barley" which guards against all sickness except death	[river] white stone called "myndan" which protects against wild beasts	
Indus	India	Yes	Lilaeus	[river] "not unlike to bugloss" remedy against the "king's evil"	[river] stone called [text missing] which prevents a virgin from being deflowered; [mountain] black stone called "clitoris" people wear in their ears	

== Works cited in-text ==
Some 49 different writers are cited with 65 works between them, including 13 on rivers, 9 on stones, 7 histories, and 12 on international relations. Five are listed as the thirteenth volume on that topic by that author. Based on the titles, there would be at least 204 works by these authors.

In comparison, Plutarch's Alexander, a much longer work, cites around 25 sources by name. The authors cited in De fluviis seem to very conveniently come in rashes of similar syllables, e.g. Ctesias (x2), Ctesiphon, Ctesippus. The text itself is highly repetitive. These facts among others cause scholars to doubt heavily that any of the works and authors cited ever existed.

However, it does provide insight into the mind of a 2nd century Greek writer, shedding some light on what they would have considered legitimate. If the intended genre was parody, then it gives insight on what a writer from the period found humorous.

Author	Books	Chapters
Achelaus	Treatise of Rivers; First Book of Rivers; First Book of Stones	I, VIII
Agatharchides the Samian	Fourth Book of Stones; Phrygian Relations	IX, X
Agatho the Samian	Second Book of Scythian Relations	XIV
Agathocles the Milesian	History of Rivers	XVIII
Agathocles the Samian	Commonwealth of Pessinus	IX
Alexander Cornelius	Third Book of Phrygian Relations	X
Antisthenes	Third Book of Meleagris	XXII
Aretazes	Phrygian Relations	XII
Aristobulus	First Book of Stones	XIV
Aristonymus	Third Book of [text missing]	XXIV
Aristotle	Fourth Book of Rivers	XXV
Caemaron	Tenth Book of the Affairs of India	IV
Callisthenes	Third Book of Hunting	IV
Callisthenes the Sybarite	Thirteenth Book of Gallic Relations	VI
Chrysermus	History of India; Third Book of Rivers; Thirteenth Book of Rivers	I, VII, XX
Chrysermus the Corinthian	First Book of his Peloponnesiacs	XVIII
Cleanthes	Third Book of the Wars of the Gods; First Book of Mountains	V, XVII
Clitonymus	Third Book of Thracian Relations	III
Clitophon	Thirteenth Book of the Building of Cities	VI, VII
Clitophon the Rhodian	First Book of Indian Relations	XXV
Ctesias	First Book of Rivers	XIX
Ctesias the Cnidian	Second Book of Mountains	XXI
Ctesias the Ephesian	First Book of the Acts of Perseus	XVIII
Ctesiphon	Third Book of Plants; First Book of Trees; Thirteenth Book of Trees	XIV, XVIII, XXIII
Ctesippus	Second Book of Scythian Relations	V
Damaratus	Third Book of Rivers; Fourth Book of Phrygia	IX
Demodocus	First Book of the History of Hercules	XVIII
Demostratus of Apamea	Second Book of Rivers	IX, XIII
Dercyllus	Third Book of Mountains; First Book of Satyrics; First Book of Stones; Third Book of Aetolics	I, VIII, X, XIX, XXII
Diocles the Rhodian	Aetolics	XXII
Dorotheus the Chaldaean	Second Book of Stones	XXIII
Heraclitus the Sicyonian	Second Book of Stones	XIII
Hermesianax of Cyprus	Second Book of his Phrygian Relations	II, XII, XXIV
Hermogenes	(borrowed from Sosthenes)	XVII
Jason of Byzantium	Thracian Histories	XI
Leo of Byzantium	History of Boeotia; Third Book of Rivers	II, XXIV
Nicanor the Samian	Second Book of Rivers	XVII
Nicias Mallotes	Book of Stones	XX
Plesimachus	Second Book of the Returns of the Heroes	XVIII
Sosthenes the Cnidian	Thirteenth Book of Iberian Relations	XVI
Sostratus	Second Book of Rivers; First Collection of Fabulous History	II, XXIV
Theophilus	First Book of Stones	XXIV
Thrasyllus	Third Book of Stones	XI
Thrasyllus the Mendesian	Thracian Histories; Relation of Egypt	XVI
Timagenes the Syrian	(borrowed an argument from Callisthenes the Sybarite)	VI
Timagoras	First Book of Rivers	XXI
Timolaus	First Book of Phrygian Relations	IX
Timotheus	Eleventh Book of Rivers; Argolica	III, XVIII
