= Marjorie Patterson =

American novelist

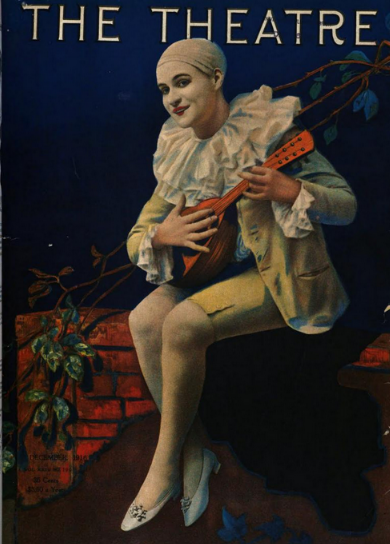
Marjorie Patterson as Pierrot, from a 1916 magazine cover.

Marjorie Patterson (May 12, 1886 – March 11, 1948) was an American author and actress in the early 20th century.

== Career ==
Her works included the novels Fortunata (1911), The Dust of the Road (1913), about her experiences acting in London, and A Woman's Man (1919).

Publishers Weekly provided this summary of Fortunata in 1911: "Fortunata is the granddaughter of an old Roman Princess and lives in a great Roman palace. When about 18 she begins to have her own way. She spends money lavishly, associates with most unhealthy companions for a young girl. Finally she drifts to England and marries a very rich man and is forced to live with his hum-drum mother and daughters. The Italian wife remains erratic and the end is tragedy." H. L. Mencken gave the book a positive review.

Patterson's theatre roles included playing the title role in Pierrot the Prodigal (which played at the Booth Theatre in New York and was produced by Winthrop Ames and Walter Knight), and in the one-act Pan in Ambush, which she wrote. She also acted for a few years in England.

Reporting on her in the 1910s places her birth year around 1891; it was not uncommon at this time for actresses to claim a younger age. Attention to her doings dropped off by about 1922, and there is little subsequent mention of her after that time.

== Personal life and death ==
Patterson was the only daughter of Wilson Patterson and Margaret Sherwood. Her great-grandfather was author and critic John Neal, and her great-aunt was Elizabeth Patterson Bonaparte, sister-in-law of Napoleon. She lived her later years in New York City where she died of hepatitis.

== Bibliography ==
- Fortunata: a novel (February 1911, Harper & Bros.)
- The Dust of the Road (1913)
- A Woman's Man (1919)
- Pan in Ambush (1916) (one act play)
