= Adrian of Batanea =

Christian martyr (died 308)

Saint Adrian of Batanea
- Died: 5 March 308; Caesarea Maritima
- Feast: 5 March
- Attributes: lion by his side

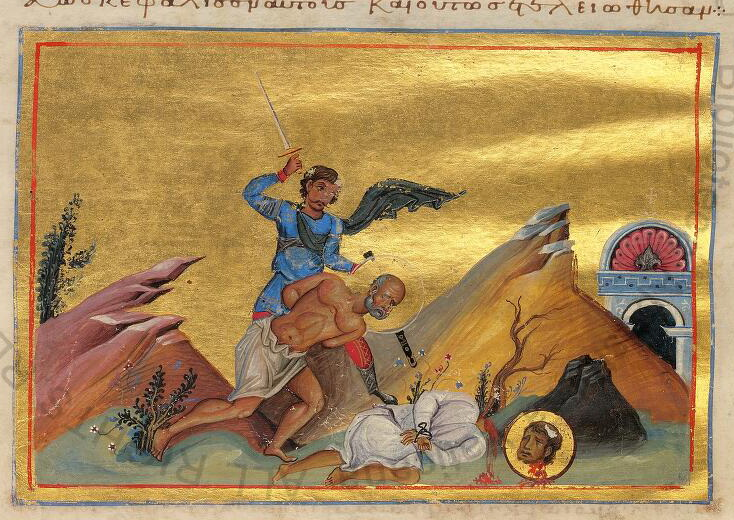

Saint Eubulus
- Died: 7 March 308; Caesarea Maritima
- Feast: 7 March

Saint Adrian (died 308) travelled from Batanea to Caesarea Palaestina, where he was martyred together with Saint Eubulus. He is commemorated on 5 March; Eubulus on 7 March.

== Legend ==
Eubulus had traveled with Adrian of Batanea to visit and minister to the Christian congregation in Caesarea. Upon arrival at the gates they were asked their purpose and told the truth, for which they were immediately imprisoned by the guards, under the orders of Governor Firmilian, who had them tortured.

On 5 March, Adrian was thrown to a lion in the amphitheatre. The lion mauled but did not kill him, so Adrian was then killed with a sword. Two days later, the judge who condemned Eubulus to the same fate offered him freedom if he would sacrifice to idols. Eubulus refused and was martyred, meeting the same fate.

They would be the last of many martyrs killed during the 12 years of persecutions in Caesarea.

== Others named Eubulus ==
Another Greek Christian named Eubulus receives passing mention in the Second Epistle to Timothy, one of the three "pastoral epistles" traditionally attributed to Paul of Tarsus. Other notable Greeks bearing the same name are noted at Eubulus.
