= Augulus =

Saint Augulus bishop, martyr
- Born: 3rd or 4th century Ireland
- Died: Augusta, Britain
- Venerated in: Roman Catholic Church; Eastern Orthodox Church
- Canonized: Pre-congregation
- Feast: 7 February

Saint Augulus (or Augurius, Augustus, Aule, Ouil) was a 3rd or 4th century bishop and martyr in a town called Augusta in Britain, or perhaps in Normandy. He was possibly Irish in origin. Little is known about him, but his feast day is given as 7 February.

== Monks of Ramsgate account ==
The Monks of Ramsgate wrote in their Book of Saints (1921),

AUGULUS (AUGUSTUS) (St.) Bp. M. (Feb. 7)
(4th cent.) His name appears in the Martyrology of Saint Jerome as a Bishop. Other ancient authorities describe him as a Martyr who laid down his life for Christ in London. This would be in the persecution under Diocletian in which Saint Alban suffered about A.D. 303. Saint Augulus is called Augustus by Venerable Bede, and Augurius by some other authors. He has been identified by French writers with Saint Ouil or Aule of Normandy.

== Butler's account ==
The hagiographer Alban Butler (1710–1773) wrote in his Lives of the Fathers, Martyrs, and Other Principal Saints under February 7,

St Augulus, B. M. His name occurs with title of bishop in all the manuscript copies of the ancient Western Martyrology, which bears the name of St. Jerom. That of the abbey of Esternach, which is very old, and several others, style him martyr. He probably received that crown soon after St. Alban. All martyrologies place him in Britain, and at Augusta, which name was given to London, as Amm. Marcellinus mentions; never to York, for which Henschenius would have it to be taken in this place, because it was at that time the capital of Britain. In the ancient copy of Bede's martyrology, which was used at St. Agnan's at Orleans, he is called St. Augustus; in some others St. Augurius. The French call him St. Aule. Chatelain thinks him to be the same saint who is famous in some parts of Normandy under the name of St. Ouil.

== O'Hanlon's views ==
John O'Hanlon (1821–1905) in his Lives of the Irish Saints discusses "Saint Augulus, Augurius, or Augulius, Bishop of Augusta, in Britain. [Third or Fourth Century]" under February 7. He notes that no Acts of Augurius exist, although various writers have alluded to him and place his festival at 7 February. He is said to have been of Irish origin and to have presided over Augusta, in Britain, which may have been the name for London. Possibly Augusta could have been some other place, such as York. O'Hanlon continues,

At an advanced age Augurius suffered martyrdom, not as said by some, A.D. 253, under the Emperor Decius, but, as Colgan thinks, after A.D. 300. The English Martyrology and Cressy state, that his triumph took place on the 7th of February, about the year of Christ, 305, and a little while after the martyrdom of St. Alban or St. Albinus. Thus should his triumph be ascribed to the period of the Emperor Diocletian. A Scottish writer, Hunibert, is cited by Dempster to prove, that the mission, preaching, labours and miracles of this holy martyr were confined to Scotia. It has been falsely asserted by the same writer, that the early teachings of Christianity had vanished entirely from England, about the year 360. But Father Henschenius endeavours to show from authorities quoted, how untrue is the assertion of Dempster, in reference to British history at that period. Some writers place the death of Augulus, so late as the year 361; and, among these are Genebrard, Horolanus, and the Scottish writer, Dempster.

O'Hanlon discusses other disagreements among the various sources, and concludes,

He is recorded as a bishop and as a martyr. This title to the latter designation is questioned by Rev. S. Baring-Gould, who remarks very justly, that little is known regarding him. The French call this holy bishop, St. Aule. Chatelain thinks him to be the same as a saint, who is famous is some parts of Normandy, under the name of St. Ouil. It does not seem desirable to enlarge further on the present holy man's Acts, since, in reality, no great amount of light can be reflected on them.

== Other accounts ==
John Morris described him—using the name Augurius—as Bishop of London and as one of the Catholic hardliners stripped of their offices following the Council of Ariminum in 359. Canon Frederick Edward Warren wrote in The Cambridge Medieval History that there was "no early authority" for Augulus and two other British martyrs "and nothing is known of their histories."

== Sources ==
- Butler, Alban (1798), The Lives of the Primitive Fathers, Martyrs, and Other Principal Saints, vol. II, J. Moir This article incorporates text from this source, which is in the public domain.
- O'Hanlon, John (1875), Lives of the Irish Saints : with special festivals, and the commemorations of holy persons, Dublin: J. Duffy This article incorporates text from this source, which is in the public domain.
- St. Augustine's Abbey, Ramsgate (1921). The Book of saints : a dictionary of servants of God canonized by the Catholic Church. London: A. & C. Black, ltd. OCLC 671676136. This article incorporates text from this source, which is in the public domain.
