= Fortunato Pasqualino =

Italian novelist, philosopher, playwright and journalist

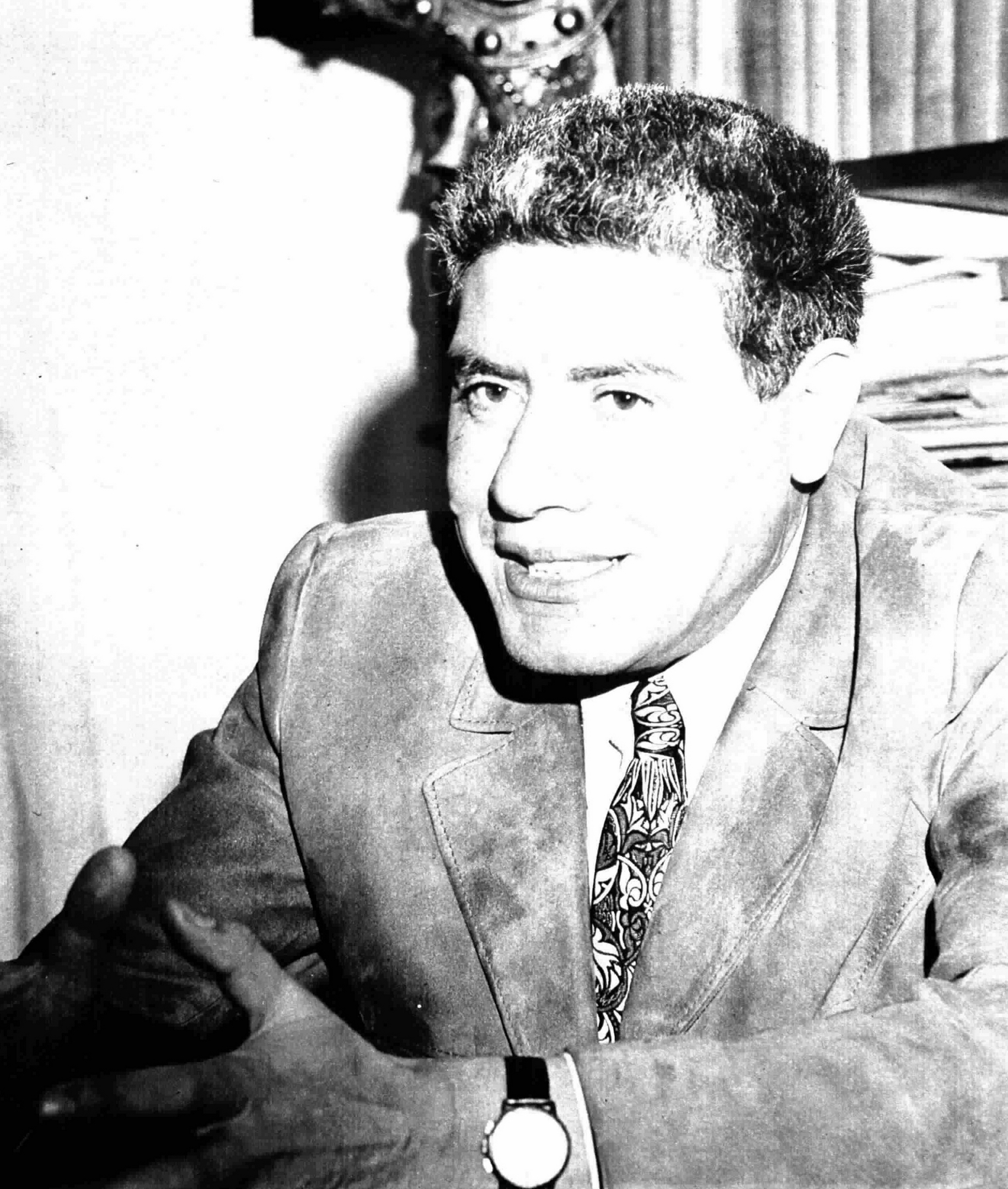
- Pasqualino in Radiocorriere magazine (1973)
- Born: 8 November 1923; Butera, Kingdom of Italy
- Died: 14 September 2008 (aged 84); Rome, Italy
- Occupation: Writer

Fortunato Pasqualino was an Italian novelist, philosopher, playwright and journalist.

== Life and career ==
Born into a poor family in Butera, Sicily, Pasqualino left the school at 10 years old to work as a labourer in orange groves; as an adolescent he reprised his studies, first as an autodidact and then with the help of some teachers, and was able to get a Liceo classico diploma. After the war, he graduated in philosophy at the University of Catania, and moved to Sardinia where he worked as a professor of philosophy, pedagogy and psychology. He later was employed at RAI, where he worked as a journalist, a television writer and occasionally as a presenter.

He started his literary activity in the late 1940s, and after several philosophical works he got his breakout in 1963 with the autobiographical novel Adamo in Sicilia ("Adam in Sicily"), which won a Flaiano Prize and was finalist at the Premio Campiello. Other important works were Diario di un metafisico ("Diary of a metaphysician", 1964), a compendium of philosophical reflections in a narrative form, and The little Jesus of Sicily (Il giorno che fui Gesù, literally "The day I was Jesus", 1977). In 1978 he won the Flaiano Prize for the stage play Socrate baccante ("Socrates Bacchante"). His last book was Chiunque tu sia. Con Gesù a passo d’asino ("Whoever you are. With Jesus at donkey pace", 2005).

Always interested in the Opera dei Pupi, a theatrical genre he treated in several books, in 1968 he founded and directed with his brother Giuseppe an Opera dei Pupi theatre in Trastevere, Rome, which was active until the early 1990s. He was also a collaborator of newspapers and philosophical and literary magazines, and a professor of philosophy of entertainment at the Pro Deo University.
