= Abraham the Poor =

Egyptian hermit and saint

Saint Abraham the Poor

Hermit
- Born: c. 4th century Menuf, Egypt
- Died: 372
- Feast: 27 October
- Attributes: an old hermit clothed in skins and sporting a blowing beard; in his cell with his niece Mary in an adjoining cell

Abraham the Poor (also Saint Abraham the Child and Abraham the Simple) was a fourth-century Egyptian hermit and a saint.

== Life ==
Born in the town of Menuf, he became a disciple of Pachomius, who founded cenobitic monasticism, in the delta region of the Nile River. He remained a disciple of Pachomius for 23 years, after which he spent the following seventeen years as a cave hermit. His nicknames of "the poor" and "the child" refer to his simple life and simple faith. His feast day is celebrated on 27 October.
