= Sergius of Cappadocia =

Saint Sergius of Cappadocia

Martyr, Monk
- Born: 2nd century
- Died: 304
- Venerated in: Catholic Church; Eastern Orthodox Church
- Canonized: Pre-Congregational Saint
- Feast: 24 February

Saint Sergius (Greek: Σέργιος; died 304) was a Cappadocian monk who was martyred in the persecutions of Diocletian. His feast day is 24 February.

Sergius was a magistrate, who became a hermit.

Some saints lists say his relics were brought to the Spanish town of Úbeda; it is a mistake: Primus Cabilonensis, in his Topographia (ca. 1450) states that Sergius' relics were moved to Baetulo (now Badalona, near Barcelona), but there is no evidence for this. The Latin name of the town has been confused with the Latin Betulla, now Úbeda (Andalusia), and different sources (mostly modern), state that relics are in the Andalusian town. Actually, there are no relics in Úbeda nor in Badalona.

The sixth-century former Church of St. Sergios in an isolated, abandoned cave church near Göreme was dedicated to a different Sergios, a soldier and martyr of Rusafa.
