= Domnina, Berenice, and Prosdoce =

Christian martyrs of the 4th century

Saints Domnina, Berenice, and Prosdoce

Martyrs
- Died: 310 AD; Syria
- Venerated in: Roman Catholic Church; Eastern Orthodox Church
- Feast: October 4

Saint Domnina and her daughters Berenice (Bernice, Veronica, Verine, Vernike) and Prosdoce are venerated as Christian martyrs by the Roman Catholic and Eastern Orthodox Churches. St. Domnina is not to be confused with Domnina of Syria, a 5th-century figure.

== Life and Martyrdom ==
There are a few different accounts of Domnina and her daughters' martyrdom story. According to the American Eastern Orthodox Church, Domnina, Berenice, and Prosdoce were living in Edessa, Mesopotamia as Christians when Berenice's and Domnina's pagan husbands turned them over to Syrian soldiers. In this account, the three women drowned themselves when the guards were intoxicated, knowing that the guards would sexually assault them.

According to 4th-century Greek bishop and historian Eusebius, Domnina was an extremely wealthy and well-known Christian noblewoman from Antioch who had two widely desired young daughters. In Eusebius's account, Domnina was raising her daughters to be Christian also. She and her daughters were tricked into being captured by Roman soldiers, and in fear that the soldiers "threatened violation of their chastity" through rape, she asked that her daughters drown together in a river after asking for some time to rest from the guards.

The account of St. John Chrysostom tells a slightly different story based on Eusebius's original account: according to Chrysostom, Domnina and her daughters drowned themselves potentially with the help of their husband and father. Chrysostom praised Domnina for her courage and Domnina's daughters for their obedience.

== Current Scholarship ==
Feminist scholarship on Domnina argues that her story as proliferated by Eusebius's and John Chrysostom's homilies were a tool in reshaping norms of wealthy Roman motherhood toward a Christian ideal of motherhood concerned with "pudicitia," meaning "feminine modesty" and "pietas," meaning piety. This scholarship also argues that Chrysostom's homily specifically accentuates and reframes Eusebius's original narrative toward such norms — the retelling was intentionally utilized to "pattern feminine behavior" within Christian congregations that was different from Roman norms of elite motherhood in its "rabid" pursuit of chastity.

Domnina and her daughters are considered martyrs because they martyred themselves during the Diocletianic persecution, or the Great Persecution. Moss argues that this era of edicts from the emperor Diocletian was the only era of actual persecution against Christian individuals en masse, which differs from modern Christian understandings of the early Christian church as in a constant state of systemic persecution by the Roman government. Moss also argues that even still, the level of persecution under Diocletian is exaggerated by modern Christian rhetoric, and that these persecutions resulted from the church committing the "capital offense" of "treason and sedition," not specifically due the nature of Christian beliefs.
