= Apollonius and Philemon =

Philemon the actor
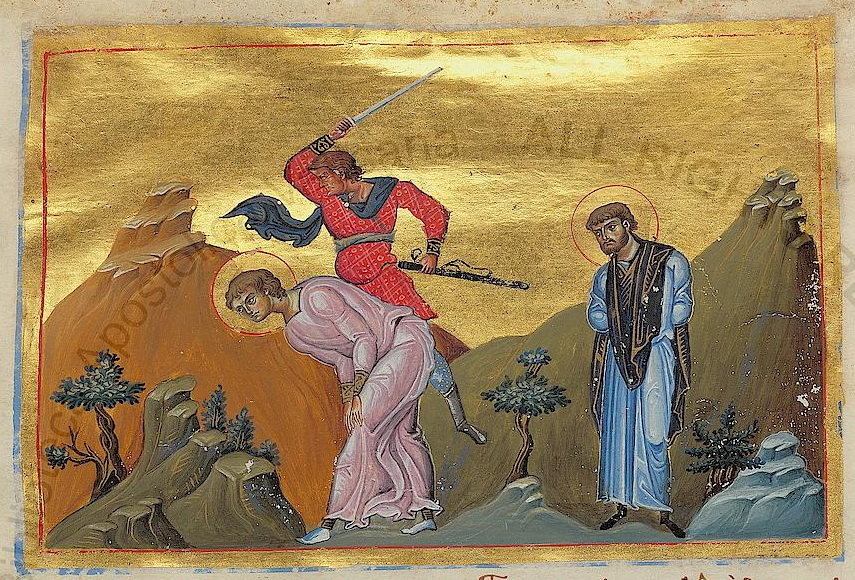

Martyr
- Died: c. 303; Alexandria
- Venerated in: Roman Catholic Church; Orthodox Church
- Canonized: Pre-congregation
- Feast: March 8
- Patronage: dancers

The deacon Apollonius and his convert Philemon were Christian martyrs of the Diocletianic Persecution around 303. Philemon was a famous flute player, mime and actor at Antinoöpolis in Egypt.

== Narrative ==
During the persecution, Philemon dons the deacon's clothes so that, disguised as Apollonius, he could offer the required sacrifice to Jupiter in his stead, and the deacon avoid imprisonment and death. However, just before performing the public sacrifice, Philemon was recognized and declared himself a Christian, and refused to make the sacrifice.

They were brought from Antinoë to Alexandria, and put to death with many others who had become believers in Christ. Their fate was to be bound hand and foot and to be cast into the sea.

== Veneration ==
Their feast day is 8 March. Philemon is the patron saint of dancers. In the Orthodox Church they are commemorated on December 14.

== Legacy ==
The story formed the subject of Philemon Martyr, a play by Jacob Bidermann. Bidermann presents acting as "a potential route to moral and spiritual transformation".

Philemon is a recurring motif in the work of the twentieth-century British artist Albert Houthuesen.
