= Dasius of Durostorum =

Bulgarian saint

Saint Dasius of Durostorum
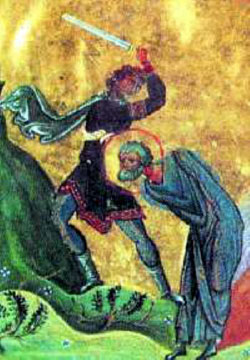
- Depiction of the execution of Dasius from the Menologion of Basil II (late 10th or early 11th century)

Martyr
- Died: Durostorum
- Feast: 20 November

Dasius of Durostorum (Bulgarian: Дазий Доростолски, Greek: Δάσιος ο μάρτυρας) is a Christian martyr of the early 4th century AD. He was a Roman soldier of Legio XI Claudiana at Durostorum (modern Silistra), Moesia Inferior who was beheaded in the early 4th century after his refusal to take the part of "king" in the local Saturnalia celebrations.

== Acta Dasii ==
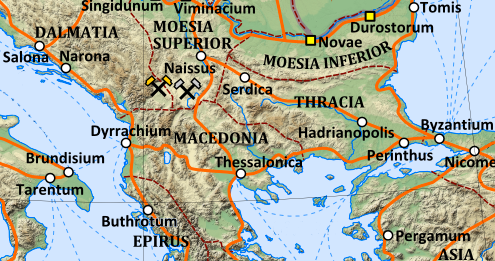
Situation of Durostorum in the Balkans during the Roman era

Dasius was the first of twelve martyrs executed at Durostorum during the Diocletianic Persecution. A Greek Passion of St. Dasius survives, also known as the Acta Dasii, dated to between the late 4th and late 6th centuries. This text was discovered in the 1890s by Franz Cumont in an 11th-century manuscript. Before Cumont's discovery, the saint had only been known from short entries in various medieval martyrologies.

The text of the Acta Dasii as it survives does not have an earlier date than the late 4th century, as Dasius is anachronistically depicted as professing the Neo-Nicene (Niceno–Constantinopolitan) creed as laid down in 381. Cumont himself dated the text to the 5th or 6th century, considering the possibility that this text was in turn based on an older, 4th-century Latin text, which would have been written within a few decades of the historical event. Cumont's assumptions are primarily based on linguistic considerations, especially on the numerous Latinisms in the Greek text. Cumont (1897) was of the opinion that much of the text reflects a historical event. A number of minor anachronisms were introduced when the Latin text was translated into Greek in the 5th or 6th century. There was a significant scholarly debate on the text during the years following Cumont's conclusions. Pillinger (1988:30) has also called into question some of Cumont's opinions in her more recent edition of the text.

The text purports to present a record of the questioning of Dasius by a legate called Bassus. In this dialogue, Dasius also refuses to honour the Imperial cult. The situation as described in the text thus presupposes the fourth Diocletian edict of 304, which required Roman soldiers to sacrifice to the emperor. Many veteran legionaries had been openly Christian during many years of service and now suddenly found themselves before the choice of either renouncing their religion or facing execution. After being questioned, Dasius is tortured and finally decapitated by one Johannes Aniketos. Hagiographical tradition tends to assign slightly earlier date to the martyrdom, either 302, 303 or 292. A parallel case is recorded in the passion of Julius the Veteran.

The text is unusual for a passio because it dedicates about one third of its content to a description of the Saturnalia festival celebrated by the pagan legionaries stationed in Durostorum. Each year, a legionary was chosen by lot to be the "king" of the festival for one month, which gave him unusual privileges and licence, but at the end of the month this "king" would be sacrificed before the altar of Saturn. In the year in question, the lot fell on Dasius, for whom, as a Christian, this was doubly condemning, as not only would he have to spend a month worshipping pagan idols, he would also then lose his life as a sacrifice to a pagan deity and damn his soul. Therefore, he preferred to refuse to accept the role of king and accept torture and execution instead.

== Veneration ==
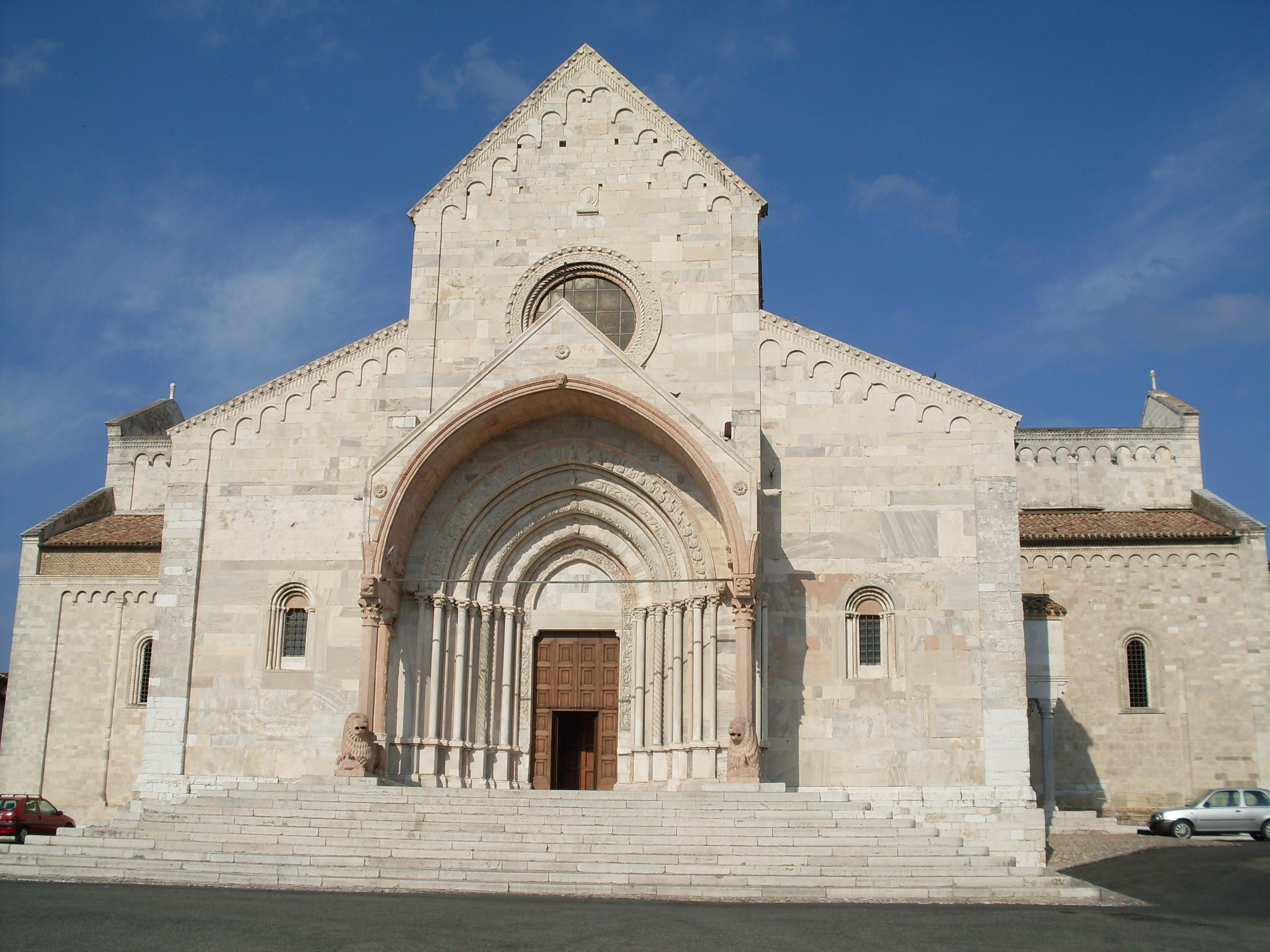
Ancona Cathedral in Italy, the resting place of Dasius's remains

After the Avar invasion of lower Moesia in the 6th century, Dasius's remains were transferred to Ancona. They now rest in a marble sarcophagus kept in the Museo Diocesiano next to Ancona Cathedral. Veneration of the saint was widespread during the 5th to 7th centuries. His feast day is 20 November. In the Martyrologium Hieronymianum (written c. 600), Dasius's name is also recorded (under 5 August) as Bassus, Dassus, Taxius an Dasus, with various feast days, among others 5 August in Irakleio, Attica, 21 December in Axiopolis (Cernavodă) in Moesia and 20 October in Puteoli (Pozzuoli). The oldest known icon of the saint is in the Menologion of Basil II (late 10th or early 11th century), under the date of 20 November. On the occasion of his visit to Bulgaria in 2002, John Paul II donated the right humerus of Dasius, taken from the Ancona relics, to the church of Silistra. The bone was presented in a small marble chest made to look similar to the Ancona sarcophagus.

== Saturnalia and human sacrifice ==
The Acta Dasii is one source for the reconstruction of Saturnalia customs in Late Antiquity. Dasius was chosen by lot to act as "king" in the Saturnalia celebrations during one month, after which he would have to cut his own throat before Saturn's altar in a form of human sacrifice.

This supposed "custom" is not found in any other source, though Saturnalia is among the best-attested Roman festivals. The emperor Nero himself played the role of the king as a youth. Cumont (1897) doubted that the claim that the sacrifice of the Saturnalian "king" reflects historical practice. He found it more likely that the king would be required to sacrifice to Saturn. Cumont thought that the account of Dasius's execution by one Johannes Aniketos might be an error in translation, as Johannes was a Christian name, which would suggest that one Christian executed another. Cumont suggested that the original text could have stated that Dasius was "buried" by Johannes.

Cumont's publication attracted much attention among scholars. A review by Léon Parmentier was published still in 1897.

Not all of Cumont's conclusions were generally accepted, and some critics tended to believe that the Saturnalia customs among legionaries at the time might indeed have involved a human sacrifice. Parmentier believed that no actual human sacrifice would have taken place, but argued that the claim of such was genuine to the original text, in an instance of 4th-century Christian propaganda depicting pagan customs as abhorrent.

Frazer in his Golden Bough seemingly accepts the historicity of the human sacrifice, and its late presence in Moesia as an archaism preserving a practice which had once been universal. In the context of his myth and ritualistic theories, he summarizes the story of Dasius as follows (1922 ed., 58.3 "The Roman Saturnalia"):

Thirty days before the festival they chose by lot from amongst themselves a young and handsome man, who was then clothed in royal attire to resemble Saturn. Thus arrayed and attended by a multitude of soldiers he went about in public with full license to indulge his passions and to taste of every pleasure, however base and shameful. But if his reign was merry, it was short and ended tragically; for when the thirty days were up and the festival of Saturn had come, he cut his own throat on the altar of the god whom he personated. In the year A.D. 303 the lot fell upon the Christian soldier Dasius, but he refused to play the part of the heathen god and soil his last days by debauchery. The threats and arguments of his commanding officer Bassus failed to shake his constancy, and accordingly he was beheaded, as the Christian martyrologist records with minute accuracy, at Durostorum by the soldier John on Friday the twentieth day of November, being the twenty-fourth day of the moon, at the fourth hour. [...] we can hardly doubt that in the King of the Saturnalia at Rome, as he is depicted by classical writers, we see only a feeble emasculated copy of that original, whose strong features have been fortunately preserved for us by the obscure author of the Martyrdom of St. Dasius. In other words, the martyrologist's account of the Saturnalia agrees so closely with the accounts of similar rites elsewhere which could not possibly have been known to him, that the substantial accuracy of his description may be regarded as established; and further, since the custom of putting a mock king to death as a representative of a god cannot have grown out of a practice of appointing him to preside over a holiday revel, whereas the reverse may very well have happened, we are justified in assuming that in an earlier and more barbarous age it was the universal practice in ancient Italy, wherever the worship of Saturn prevailed, to choose a man who played the part and enjoyed all the traditionary privileges of Saturn for a season, and then died [...] in the character of the good god who gave his life for the world.

Ivan Venedikov has cited the part of Dasius's passio dealing with the pagan ceremony as an early source for the Kukeri New-Year's procession in Bulgarian folklore. While Bulgarian sources tend to emphasize the continuity with contemporary Bulgarian folklore, western authors tended to use the account as evidence for the Roman Saturnalia in general.

== Bibliography ==
- Renate Pillinger (ed., trans.), Das Martyrium des Heiligen Dasius, Vienna (1988), ISBN 978-3-7001-1514-4.
- Valentina Drumeva,Разкази за българските светии и за светиите, свързани с България ("Stories of Bulgarian saints and of saints associated with Bulgaria"), part I, Zograf Monastery, 2005.
- I. Duychev, G. Tsankova-Petkova et al., Гръцки извори за българската история (ГИБИ, "Greek sources for Bulgarian history") vol. 3, Bulgarian Academy of Sciences, Sofia 1960.
