= Fortunato of Brescia =

- Girolamo Ferrari
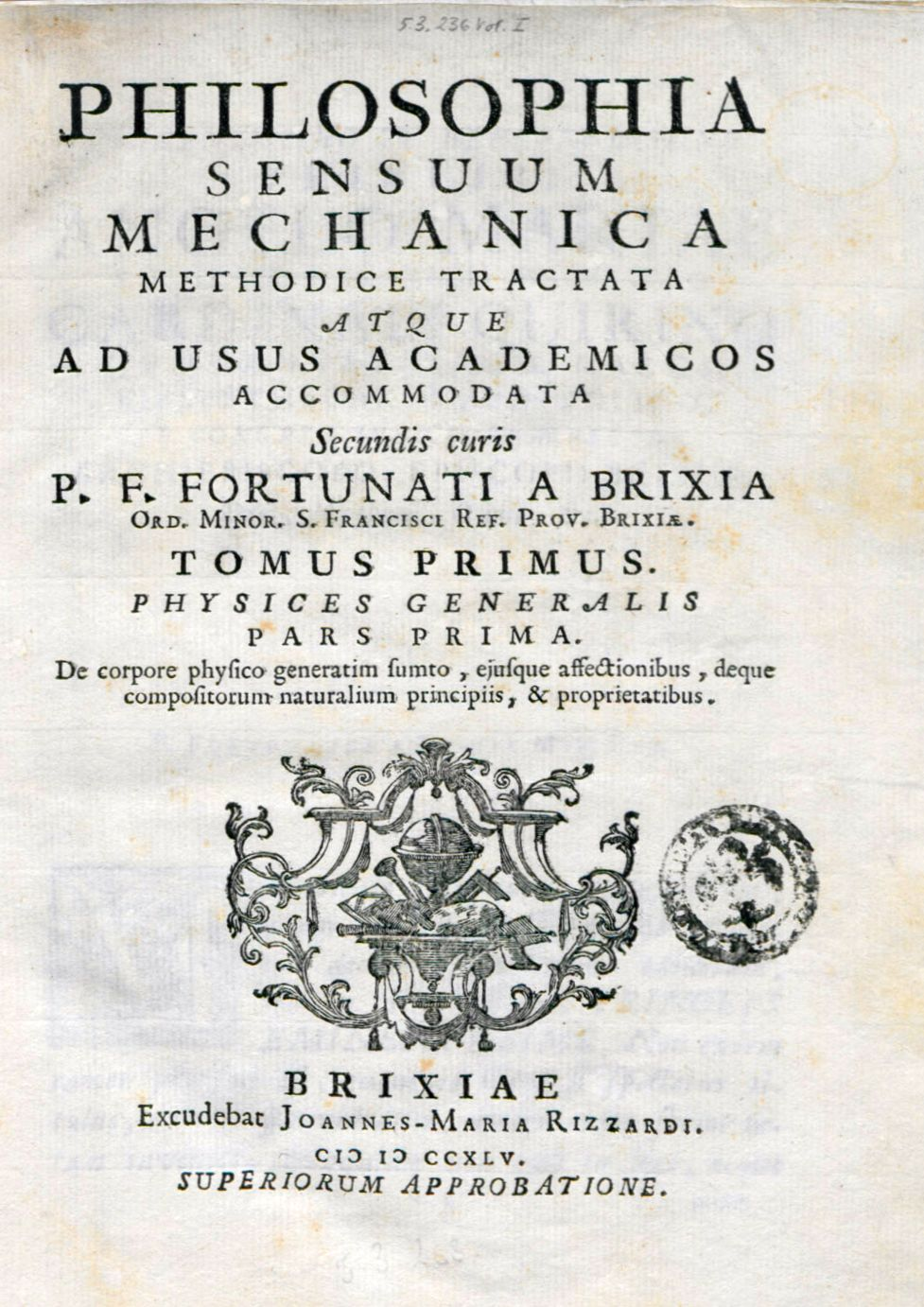
- Philosophia sensuum mechanica, 1745
- Born: December 1, 1701; Brescia, Republic of Venice
- Died: 11 May 1754 (aged 52); Madrid, Spain
- Occupations: Friar, mathematician, physicist, anatomist, philosopher, theologian
- Known for: The concept of tissue
- Parent(s): Giovanni Ferrari and Angela Ferrari (née Maioni)

Academic background
- Influences: Galilei; Gassendi; Malebranche; Malpighi; Newton; Leibniz; Tolomei

Academic work
- Influenced: Xavier Bichat

Fortunato of Brescia (1701–1754) was an Italian Minorite friar, mathematician, philosopher and anatomist.

== Life ==
He was born in Brescia, and received the religious habit in 1718. A philosopher and theologian, Fortunato was also renowned for his studies in the natural sciences. He was the secretary general of his order, and stood in high favour at the Bourbon court of Spain. He died in Madrid.

== Works ==
He was among the first to bring together the teachings of Scholastic philosophy and the discoveries of the physical sciences. His scientific work is rendered important by his extensive use of the microscope, in which he followed the lead of Malpighi. Avoiding the then prevalent discussions on vitalism, he devoted himself to a positive study of the problems of natural science.

Convinced that a knowledge of microscopic anatomy is the key to the secrets of nature, he deemed two things to be of prime importance:

1. an experimental study of the histological constitution of the various organs, to learn their functions; and
2. the separation of these organs into their elements, to determine their embryological origin.

This view, clear in the works of Fortunato, has prevailed in pathology and physiology, and in this sense Fortunato was a pioneer. He confined himself to the microscopic study of the parts of the organism, and in this way succeeded in classifying tissues and organs many years before Bichat (1800). Fortunato was the first to distinguish between tissues and organs.

He established the idea of tissues, or, as he wrote, "of those organic parts which possess a definite structure visible with the microscope and characterized by their component elements". With sufficient accuracy, he described connective and bony tissue. The morphological complexus of the various tissues he calls the "system of tissues"; and the physiological complexus of the various organs he calls the "system of organs".

From his many accurate descriptions, it is evident that his research extended to many animals, and particularly to insects. He innovated in comparative anatomy, with ideas not found in Malpighi, Morgagni, Leeuwenhoek, or Haller, the path-finders in microscopic anatomy.
