= Julius the Veteran =

Bulgarian saint (255–c.304)

Saint Julius the Veteran
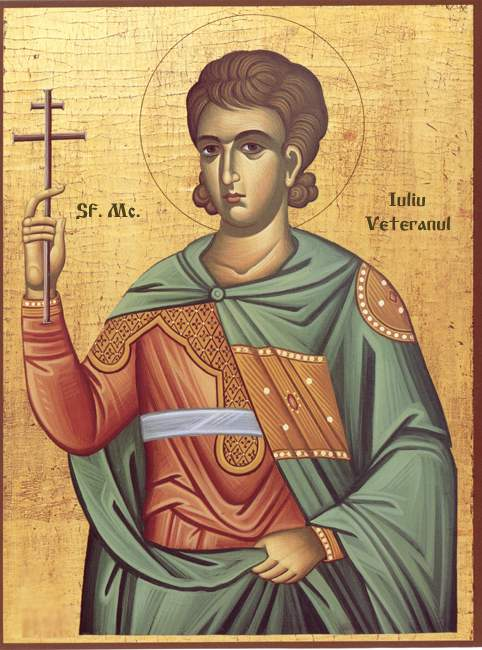
- Romanian Orthodox icon of Saint Julius

Martyr
- Born: 255
- Died: c. 304 (trad. also 292, 302); Durostorum, Roman Empire
- Venerated in: Eastern Orthodox Church; Roman Catholic Church; Anglican Communion
- Feast: 27 May
- Attributes: Martyr's cross
- Patronage: Military Saint

Saint Julius the Veteran (Latin: Iulius), also known as Julius of Durostorum, is a Christian martyr venerated as a saint in the Eastern Orthodox Church, Roman Catholic Church and the Church of England. His feast day is 27 May.

== Life ==
Julius of Durostorum was born to pagan parents. The date of Julius' conversion to Christianity is unknown. Julius served as a Roman soldier for 27 years first as a conscript, then returning as a [veteran], totaling seven military campaigns in total. Given the years and locations in which Julius served, Rev. Herbert Musurillo, S.J. writes that Julius likely served in the Legio XI Claudia. Julius was Christian his entire military career.

In accordance with the fourth edict of the Diocletian Persecution, Julius was brought to trial before the prefect, Maximus, after being arrested by Maximus' staff soldiers for refusing to make a public sacrifice to the Roman gods. Upon hearing of his military service, Maximus complimented Julius for being a wise and serious man. In gratitude for his military service, Maximus proposed Julius a bargain: if Julius offered the public sacrifice, Maximus would accept blame for the sin of the sacrifice and would give Julius freedom, a ten-year bonus payment, and immunity from future charges. Julius declined the offer and was sentenced to death. Julius was killed by the sword in Durostorum, the Roman camp in Moesia Inferior (modern Silistra, Bulgaria) sometime between January and March of 304. Julius is widely considered a martyr.

== Literature ==
- L. Arik Greenberg: My Share of God's Reward. Exploring the Roles and Formulations of the Afterlife in Early Christian Martyrdom, Studies in Biblical Literature - volume 121, Lang, New York, Bern, Berlin, Bruxelles, Frankfurt am Main, Oxford, Vienna 2009, ISBN 978-1-4331-0487-9, pp. 195–198.
