= Ampelus =

Martyr venerated by Eastern Orthodox and Roman Catholic churches on November 20

Saint Ampelus (died 302) is a martyr venerated by the Eastern Orthodox and Roman Catholic churches on November 20. He was killed by Romans with his companion, Gaius, during the reign of Diocletian.
