= Laura Fortunato (academic) =

Evolutionary anthropologist

Academic background
- Education: University College London

Academic work
- Discipline: Evolutionary Anthropology
- Institutions: University of Oxford

Laura Fortunato is an evolutionary anthropologist whose research investigates the evolution of human social and cultural behavior. She investigates topics such as the evolution of kinship and marriage systems, social complexity and culture. She is Professor of Evolutionary Anthropology at the University of Oxford.

== Education ==
Fortunato completed a 5-year Laurea in biological sciences from the University of Padova in 2003, followed by graduate degrees (MRes and PhD) in anthropology from University College London (2004 and 2009). Between 2010 and 2013 she held an Omidyar Fellowship at the Santa Fe Institute. She joined the University of Oxford in 2013, as University Lecturer in Evolutionary Anthropology and Tutorial Fellow at Magdalen College. She is also an External Professor and a member of the Science Steering Committee at the Santa Fe Institute.

Fortunato is a member of the steering group of the UK Reproducibility Network.

Other areas of work include open research, especially the provision of training of related practices, and effective computing for research reproducibility utilizing free and open source software. She is a Director of the Software Freedom Conservancy.

In September 2023 Fortunato was awarded a Title of Distinction of Professor of Evolutionary Anthropology, backdated to 2021, by the University of Oxford.

== Selected publications ==
- Fortunato, L., Clare Holden, Ruth Mace. 2006. From bridewealth to dowry? A Bayesian estimation of ancestral states of marriage transfers in Indo-European groups. Human Nature 17(4): 355–376
- Fortunato, L., Fiona Jordan 2010. Your place or mine? A phylogenetic comparative analysis of marital residence in Indo-European and Austronesian societies. Philosophical Transactions of the Royal Society B: Biological Sciences 365(1559): 3913–3922.
- Fortunato, L., Marco Archetti. 2010. Evolution of monogamous marriage by maximization of inclusive fitness. Journal of Evolutionary Biology 23(1): 149–156.
- Fortunato, L. 2011. Reconstructing the history of marriage strategies in Indo-European-speaking societies: monogamy and polygyny. Human Biology 83(1): 87–105.
- Fortunato, L. 2011. Reconstructing the history of residence strategies in Indo-European-speaking societies: neo-, uxori-, and virilocality. Human Biology 83(1): 107–128
- Fortunato, L. 2012. The evolution of matrilineal kinship organization. Proceedings of the Royal Society B: Biological Sciences 279(1749): 4939–4945
- Fortunato, L., 2017. Insights from evolutionary anthropology on the (pre) history of the nuclear family. Cross-Cultural Research 51(2): 92-116.
- Munafò, M.R., Chambers, C.D., Collins, A.M., Fortunato, L. and Macleod, M.R., 2019. Research Culture and Reproducibility. Trends in Cognitive Sciences.
