= List of people from Palestine (historical region) =

List of notable historic figures from the region of Palestine

This is a list of people who lived in the region of Palestine before the establishment of Mandatory Palestine in 1920 (Note: Only people from this region who died before 25 April 1920 are included on this list.) and the later states of Israel and Palestine. The people listed here were either born in the region of Palestine or are described in historical sources as being from Palestine.

Chronologically or by floruit and regnal succession:

Name	Field	Speciality	Place of birth	Dates
Abdi-Heba	Politics	Canaanite ruler of Urushalim (Jerusalem) under Egyptian patronage, one of the authors of the Amarna letters	Canaan	c. 1350 BCE
Addaya	Politics	Governor of Hazzatu (Gaza)	Canaan?	c. 1350–1335 BC
Biridiya	Politics	Ruler of Magidda (Megiddo)	Canaan	c. 1350 BCE
Labaya (Note: Na'aman, 1997:"Lab'ayu of Shechem and his sons are the best documented rulers in the area of Palestine, and many details of their career are known from the correspondence. Yet the name of their capital is mentioned neither in Lab'ayu's letters nor in the letters of other kings, nor in Egyptian texts of the time of the New Kingdom. Shechem (mat Sakmi) is mentioned once in a letter from Jerusalem (EA 289:21-24), but the reference alone is not enough to identify their seat. Fortunately, we are able to identify Lab'ayu's and his sons' capital thanks to the many references to their offensive in the Amarna letters. Similar references relating to many other rulers whose seats are not mentioned are missing, and the identities of their capitals remain unknown.") & Mutbaal	Politics	Ruler of Šakmu, (Schehem) author of several Amarna letters; his son Mutbaal co-ruled in the area east of the Jordan River and succeeded him after his death as ruler of the west too	Canaan	c. 1350 BCE
Milki-El & Yapahu	Politics	Ruler of Gazru (Gezer)	Canaan	c. 1350 BCE
Sitatna	Politics	Ruler of Akka (Acre)	Canaan	c. 1350
Shuwardata (possible successor Abdi-Ashtarti, not to be confused with Amurru kingdom ruler Abdi-Ashirta)	Politics	Ruler of Gimtu (Tell es-Safi)	Canaan	c. 1350 BCE
Yashdata	Politics	Ruler of Ta'anach (Ti'inik)	Canaan	c. 1350 BCE
Yidya (predecessor Shubanda)	Politics	Ruler of Asqalana (Ascalon)	Canaan	c. 1350
Zimredda	Politics	Ruler of Lakisha (Lachish)	Canaan	c. 1350
Omri	Politics	Founder of the Kingdom of Israel, known in Assyrian inscriptions as "the House of Omri" (Bit-Humri)	Samaria (?)	d. c. 873 BCE
Ahab	Politics	King of Israel	Kingdom of Israel	d. c. 853 BCE
Jehu	Politics	King of Israel who exterminated the house of Omri, depicted on the Black Obelisk of Shalmaneser III	Kingdom of Israel	c. 842-815 BCE
Jehoash	Politics	King of Israel, mentioned as "Jehoash the Samarian" on the Tell al-Rimah Stele of Adad-nirari III	Kingdom of Israel	c. 798-782 BCE
Jeroboam II	Politics	King of Israel, associated with the Seal of Shema and the Samaria ostraca	Kingdom of Israel	c. 788-747 BCE
Menahem	Politics	King of Israel who paid tribute to Tiglath-Pileser III of Assyria, recorded in the Assyrian annals	Kingdom of Israel	c. 752-742 BCE
Ahaz	Politics	King of Judah, recorded as "Jehoahaz of Judah" on the Nimrud Tablet K.3751 of Tiglath-Pileser III	Kingdom of Judah	c. 735-715 BCE
Qaus-malaka	Politics	King of Edom	Edom	c. 735-710
Hanunu	Politics	King of Gaza	Philistia	c. 734 BCE
Mitinti I	Politics	King of Ascalon	Philistia	d. c. 734
Rukibtu	Politics	King of Ascalon	Philistia	c. 733
Hoshea	Politics	Last king of Israel, whose accession is recorded in the Annals of Tiglath-Pileser III	Kingdom of Israel	c. 732-724 BCE
Pekah	Politics	King of Israel, whose replacement by Hoshea is recorded in the annals of Tiglath-Pileser III	Kingdom of Israel	d. c. 732 BCE
Yamani	Politics	King of Isdud	Philistia	c. 712 BCE
Ilāya-rām	Politics	King of Edom	Edom	c. 710-685 BCE
Padi	Politics	King of Ekron	Philistia	c. 701 BCE (Note: Gitin, 2003, p. 287: "Two of the five names of city's rulers mentioned in the inscription - Padi and Ikausu - appear in the Neo-Assyrian Annals as kings of 'amqar(r)una, that is, Ekron, an Assyrian vassal city-state in the 7th century B.C.E. (Gitin 1995: 62). Padi is known from the Annals of Sennacherib in the context of the Assyrian king's 701 B.C.E. campaign, at the end of which he gave the towns of the defeated Judean King Hezekiah to Padi and others (Pritchard 1969: 287-88). Padi is also cited in a docket dated to 699 B.C.E., according to which he delivered a light talent of silver to Sennacherib (Fales and Postgate 1995: 21-22). Ikausu is listed as one of the 12 coastal kings who transported building materials to Nineveh for the palace of Esarhaddon (680-669 B.C.E.), and his name also appears in a list of kings who participated in Ashurbanipal's first campaign against Egypt in 667 B.C.E. (Pritchard 1969: 291, 294).")
Sidqa	Politics	King of Asqalana	Philistia	c. 701 BCE
Sil-Bel	Politics	King of Gaza	Philistia	c. 701-669 BCE
Ikausu	Politics	King of Ekron	Philistia	c. 699-667 BCE
Hezekiah	Politics	King of Judah	Kingdom of Judah	d. c. 687 BCE
Manasseh	Politics	King of Judah, listed as a vassal of Esarhaddon	Kingdom of Judah	c. 687-642 BCE
Qaus-gabri	Politics	King of Edom	Edom	c. 685-665
Mitinti III	Politics	King of Asqalana	Philistia	c. 667 BCE
Josiah	Politics	King of Judah	Kingdom of Judah	d. 609 BCE
Jehoiachin	Politics	King of Judah exiled to Babylon, where his rations are recorded in Babylonian administrative tablets	Kingdom of Judah	fl. c. 597 BCE
Zedekiah	Politics	Last king of Judah, installed by Nebuchadnezzar II before the destruction of Jerusalem	Kingdom of Judah	fl. 597-586 BCE
Sanballat the Horonite	Politics	Governor of Samaria, mentioned in the Elephantine papyri	Samaria	fl. 5th c. BCE
Johanan	Religion (Judaism)	High priest of Jerusalem attested in the Elephantine Papyri	Kingdom of Judah	fl. c. 407 BCE
Hezekiah	Politics	Governor of Yehud attested on Yehud coinage	Judea	fl. late 4th c. BCE
Batis	Politics	Governor of Gaza and military commander loyal to the Achaemenid empire	Gaza	d. 332 BCE
Onias II	Religion (Judaism)	High priest of Jerusalem during the Ptolemaic period	Judea	fl. 3rd c. BCE
Menippus (Note: Geiger, 2014, p. 9: "All this said it is of course clear, that the Palestinian provenance of some important Greek poets, writers and philosophers did not go unnoticed by classical scholars. From the Cynic Menippus, the poet Meleager and the poet and philosopher Philodemus, all of Gadara in the Hellenistic Age, to Marinus of Neapolis, the last Head but two of the Neoplatonic School in Athens and Procopius of Caesarea, the historian of the Age of Justinian and the last to uphold the tradition of classical historiography, the place of their birth, and in some of the cases the place of their activity, were duly noticed. Among intellectuals from Ascalon only the philosopher Antiochus, and to a lesser degree the mathematician Eutocius (and to an even lesser degree, the poet Euenus and the architect Julian) have received special attention. Nevertheless, with the sole exception of the so-called School of Gaza in the fifth and sixth centuries it has never been attempted to position a group of Greek intellectuals in their Palestinian surroundings, or of analysing the contribution to Greek cultural life of the inhabitants of one city in that country; Part II of this book will attempt to rise to this challenge.")	Literature	Author of polemicist works, father of Menippean satire	Gadara	c. 3rd century BCE
Simon II	Religion (Judaism)	High priest of Jerusalem praised in the Book of Sirach	Judea	fl. c. 219-196 BCE
Jason	Religion (Judaism)	High priest of Judaea associated with the Hellenization of Jerusalem	Judea	fl. c. 175-171 BCE
John Hyrcanus	Politics	Hasmonean ruler and high priest	Judea	c. 175-104 BCE
Onias III	Religion (Judaism)	High priest of Israel and opponent of Hellenization	Judea	d. 171 BCE
Menelaus	Politics / Religion	Hellenizing high priest of Jerusalem appointed by Antiochus IV	Judea	d. 162 BCE
Alcimus	Religion (Judaism)	High priest of Israel installed under Seleucid authority	Judea	d. 159 BCE
Mattathias	Politics	Priest and leader of the Maccabean Revolt	Modein	d. c. 166 BCE
Judas Maccabeus	Politics	Leader of the Maccabean Revolt against the Seleucid Empire	Modein	d. 160 BCE
Jonathan Apphus	Politics	Leader of the Maccabees and first Hasmonean high priest, appointed by Alexander Balas	Modein	d. 143 BCE
Salome Alexandra	Politics	Queen regnant of Judea, last regnant monarch of the Hasmonean Kingdom	Judea	139–67 BCE
Simon Thassi	Politics	Hasmonean ruler and high priest who established Judean autonomy from the Seleucids	Modein	d. 135 BCE
Antiochus of Ascalon	Academia	Philosophy	Ascalon	c.125 BCE
Meleager of Gadara	Literature	Poet	Gadara	c.120 BCE
Antipater the Idumaean	Politics	Forefather of the Herodian dynasty	Idumaea, possibly Hebron	114/113-49 BCE
Aristobulus I	Politics	King and high priest of Judaea	Jerusalem	d. 103 BCE
Alexander Jannaeus	Politics	King and high priest of Judaea	Judea	103-76 BCE
Jose ben Jochanan	Religion (Judaism)	Talmudic rabbi	Jerusalem	2nd c. BCE
Artemidorus of Ascalon	Academia	Historian		c. 63 BCE
Costobarus	Politics	Governor of Idumea and Gaza, married to Herod's sister Salome I	Idumea	d. c. 27-25 BCE
Herod the Great	Politics	King of Judea (37–4 BCE)	Idumea, Ascalon (Note: Qleibo, 2021: "The Palestinian Lakhmid tribe, from which my family’s founding ancestor descends, together with other tribes formed the Edomite Dynasty that reached its zenith in the age of the Edomite King Herod, born in Ashqelon, barely 37 kilometers from Beit Jibreen.)	c.72 BCE
Aretas IV	Politics	King of the Nabataeans	Nabataean kingdom	c. 9 BCE-40 CE
Jesus	Religion (Judaism)	Founder of Christianity	Bethlehem	c.4 BCE
Simeon ben Gamliel	Religion (Judaism)	Talmudic rabbi	Jerusalem	c. 10 BCE-70 CE
Mary, mother of Jesus	Religion (Judaism)	Mother of Jesus of Nazareth	Sepphoris	c.18 BCE
Saint Peter	Religion (Judaism)	Apostle of Jesus, primus inter pares among the Twelve Apostles		1st century BCE
Josephus	Academia	Historian	Jerusalem	c. 37
Elisha ben Abuyah	Religion (Judaism)	Talmudic rabbi	Jerusalem	before 70
Hermione of Ephesus	Religion (Christianity)	Martyr, saint, hospital founder	Caesarea	d. 117
Eliezer ben Hurcanus	Religion (Judaism)	Talmudic rabbi		c. 40-120
Malichus II	Politics	King of the Nabataeans	Nabataean kingdom	40-70 CE
Rabbi Akiva	Religion (Judaism)	Talmudic rabbi	Lod	c. 50-135
Rabbel II Soter	Politics	King of the Nabataeans	Nabataean kingdom	70-106
Shimon ben Yochai	Religion (Judaism)	Talmudic rabbi	Galilee?	c. 90-160
Justin Martyr	Religion (Christianity)	Christian apologist and martyr	Flavia Neapolis	c. 100-c. 165
Narcissus of Jerusalem	Religion (Christianity)	Bishop	Aelia Capitolina, Roman Palestine	c. 99-212
Jose the Galilean	Religion (Judaism)	Talmudic rabbi	Galilee	1st-2nd c.
Symmachus	Religion (Samaritan, Judaism, Christianity)	Translator of biblical texts	Samaria	c. 2nd century
Matteya ben Heresh	Religion (Judaism)	Talmudic rabbi	Judea	2nd c.
Jose ben Helpetha	Religion (Judaism)	Talmudic rabbi	Sepphoris	2nd c.
Sextus Julius Africanus	Literature	Philosopher, historian, Christian traveler	Jerusalem	c. 160-240
Titus Flavius Boethus (Note: Geiger, 2014, p. 18: "Flavius Boethus From Ptolemais, interested in Peripatetic philosophy and medicine, known only from Galen and the inscription quoted below, according to which he may have been consul in 161 or 162 and governor not before 164 or 165: he is the only person from Palestine in the Early Empire to become governor of the province. It may be conjectured that Galen's visit to Palestine (see GLAJJ II, nos. 382, 384, 385, 390) was connected with their relationship: Galen restored to health Boethus' wife and one of his sons, and was handsomely rewarded and introduced to Mark Aurel; Galen eventually dedicated to him not less than nine of his works.")	Politics	Roman Senator and Governor	Ptolemais (Akka)	d. 168
Rabbi Jochanan	Religion (Judaism)	Talmudic rabbi	Sepphoris	c.220
Abba bar Zabdai	Religion (Judaism)	Talmudic rabbi		3rd c.
Levi ben Sisi	Religion (Judaism)	Talmudic rabbi		3rd-4th c.
Eusebius	Academia and Religion (Christianity)	"Father of Church History"	Caesarea Palestinae	c.263
Alexander of Gaza	Religion (Christianity)	Martyr	Gaza	c. 303
Alphaeus and Zacchaeus	Religion (Christianity)	Martyrs	Caesarea Maritima	d. 303/304
Peter Apselamus	Religion (Christianity)	Martyr	Anea in the district of Eleutheropolis	c. 309-311
Paulinus	Academia	Doctor, student of Plotinus	Scythopolis	d. before 270
Rabbi Assi	Religion (Judaism)	Talmudic rabbi	Babylonia	c.270
Saint Agapius of Palestine	Religion (Christianity)	Martyr	Gaza	c.270
Procopius of Scythopolis	Religion (Christianity)	Martyr	Jerusalem	c.270
Romanus of Caesarea	Religion (Christianity)	Martyr	Caesarea Palestinae	c.270
Samuel ben Nahman	Religion (Judaism)	Talmudic rabbi		3rd-4th c.
Hilarion	Religion (Christianity)	Monk	Tabatha (Gaza)	c.291
Saint George	Religion (Christianity)	Christian martyr	Lydda	c.300
Alphaeus and Zacchaeus	Religion (Christianity)	Martyrs	Eleutheropolis (Bayt Jibrin)	d. c. 303/4
Epiphanius of Salamis (Note: Geiger, 2014, p. 13: "Aeneas 1 was born about 430, studied in Alexandria with Hierocles in about 450, and is attested in 488; the fact that Zacharias 1 referred to him in 514 without a formula confirming his death should not be taken as proof. He visited Constantinople and had connections in Antioch and other cities. Among his Palestinian correspondents were Iohannes 3 (not sure, see s. v.), Zonaeus, Diodorus, Zosimus 2, Epiphanius 2, the iatrosphist Gessius of Petra, and Julianus 1, as well as the sophist Diogenes of Antioch, who corresponded also with Hierius and with Eutocius 1. The absence of any correspondence between him and Procopius 1 must be due to both of them residing in the same city and should not be construed even as an argumentum e silen tio against their acquaintance.)	Religion (Christianity)	Church Father	Eleutheropolis	c.310
Silvanus of Gaza (hieromartyr)	Religion (Christianity)	Soldier, Martyr	Gaza, Syria Palaestina	d. c. 311
Cyril of Jerusalem	Religion (Christianity)	Bishop of Jerusalem	Jerusalem (vicinity)	c. 313–386/387)
Gelasius of Caesarea	Religion (Christianity)	Author, Bishop of Caesarea Maritima	Palestine	c. 335-395
Silvanus of Gaza	Religion (Christianity)	Palestinian monk, one of the Desert Fathers	Palestine	d. c. 414
Sozomen	Academia	Historian	Gaza	c.400-450
Marinus of Neapolis	Academia	Mathematician, astronomer, poet	Flavia Neapolis (Nablus)	c. 440
Zosimas of Palestine	Religion (Christianity)	Acsetic, scholar, saint	Palaestina Prima, Diocese of the East	c. 460-560
Zacharias Rhetor	Religion (Christianity)	Bishop and church historian	Gaza	late 5th-early 6th c.
Aeneas of Gaza	Academia	Philosophy	Gaza	c.460
Procopius of Gaza	Academia	Philosophy	Gaza	c.465
Choricius of Gaza	Academia student of Procopius	Philosophy		c. late 5th - early 6th century
Eutocius of Ascalon	Academia	Mathematics	Ascalon	c.480
Procopius of Caesarea	Academia	Historian	Caesarea Palaestina	c.500
Timotheus of Gaza	Academia	Grammarian and poet	Gaza	c. late 5th-early 6th
John of Gaza (Iohannes)	Academia	Grammarian and poet	Gaza	early 6th century
Cyril of Scythopolis	Religion (Christianity)	Monk, hagiographer	Scythopolis (Beisan)	c. 525
Tribunus	Medicine	Physician	Palestine	c. 6th century
Tamim al-Dari	Religion (Christianity & Islam)	Bishop who became a Companion of the Prophet Muhammad	Bayt Jibrin	d. 661
Rawh ibn Zinba al-Judhami	Politics	Leader of the Banu Judham tribe	Palestine	d. 703
Raja ibn Haywa	Politics	Political advisor to four of the Umayyad caliphs	Beisan	d. 730
Stephen the Sabaite	Religion (Christianity)	Monk, saint, author, librarian at Mar Saba	Julis, Gaza	c. 725-794
Michael Synkellos	Religion (Christian)	Arab Greek Orthodox homilist and grammarian, Synkellos and saint	Jerusalem	761-846
Al-Shafi'i	Religion (Islam)	Scholar and theologian	Gaza	767
Pirqoi ben Baboi	Religion (Judaism)	Talmudist		c. 800
Al-Tabarani	Religion (Islam)	Prolific author of Hadith narrations	Tabariyya	c. 873-970
Daniel al-Kumisi	Religion (Judaism)	Early Karaite Judaism scholar, biblical commentator, and a founder of the Mourners of Zion	Damghan (emigrated to Jerusalem)	fl. late 9th–early 10th c.
Aaron ben Moses ben Asher	Religion (Judaism)	Masorete	Tiberias	c. 960
Sahl ben Matzliah	Religion (Judaism)	Karaite philosopher	Jerusalem	910-990
Sulayman al-Ghazzi	Religion (Christianity)	Bishop and poet	Gaza	c.940
al-Muqaddasi	Academia	medieval geographer	Jerusalem	c.946
Mufarrij ibn Daghfal ibn al-Jarrah	Politics	Leader of the Jarrahid tribal dynasty, ruled southern Palestine	Palestine (southern)	fl. ca. 977–1013
Al-Tamimi	Medicine	author of several medical works, pharmacist and personal physician to the governor of Ramla	Jerusalem	d. 990
Abu Bakr Muhammad ibn Ahmad al-Wasiti	Religion (Islam)	Khatib of Al-Aqsa mosque and author of book on the virtues of Jerusalem	Jerusalem	c. 1019
Nathan ben Abraham I	Religion (Judaism)	Rabbi, author of Judeo-Arabic exegesis of the Mishnah, head of the Yeshiva in Jerusalem	Jund Filastin	d. c. 1051
Abu Muhammad al-Yazuri	Politics	Vizier for the Fatimid caliphate (1050-1058)	Yazur	d. 1058
Ibn Tahir	Religion (Islam)	Islamic scholar and historian	Jerusalem	1057-1113
Al-Afdal Shahanshah, son of Badr al-Jamali, founder of the Jayyusi family	Politics	Vizier for the Fatimid caliphate (1094-1121)	Akka	1066-1121
Qadi al-Fadil, Al-Asqalani	Politics	Vizier in Ayyubid dynasty, advisor to Saladin	Asqalan	1135-1200
Abd al-Ghani al-Maqdisi	Religion (Islam)	Author of Biographical evaluation of Hadith narrators	Jamma'in, Nablus district	c. 1146-1203
Ibn Qudamah of the Banu Qudama	Religion (Islam)	Hanbali jurist, theologian, ascetic, fought alongside Salahaddin	Jamma'in, Nablus district	c.1147
Ibn Siqlab	Medicine	Physician to Ayyubid emir	Old City of Jerusalem	1165/6-1228
Abu Sulayman Da'ud	Medicine	Arab Christian physician and astrologer	Jerusalem	c. 12th century
Diya' al-Din al-Maqdisi of the Banu Qudama	Religion (Islam)	Hanbali scholar, author of several works on religious practice in Jabal Nablus	Damascus, after his family fled Jamma'in due to the Crusader threat	1174-1245
Tanhum of Jerusalem	Religion (Judaism)	Judeo-Arabic author and Hebrew lexicographer		d. 1291
Ibn al-Sa'lus	Politics and trade	Merchant, appointed vizier in Damascus and later Cairo	Nablus	d. 1294
Ibn Abi Talib al-Dimashqi	Religion (Islam)	Sheikh and author	Safad	1256-1327
Salah al-Din al-Safadi	Literature, Art, Religion (Islam)	Grammarian, historian, artist, poet	Safad	1296-1396
Ibn Muflih	Religion (Islam)	Jurisconsult	Qaqun	1310–1362
Abu l-Fath al-Samiri al-Danafi	Literature	Chronicler of the history of Samaritans	Nablus	c. 1355
Ibn Raslan	Religion (Islam)	Shafa'i jurist and poet	Ramla	1371–1440
Mujir al-Din al-'Ulaymi	History of Palestine	historian	Jerusalem	c.1456
Turabay ibn Qaraja	Politics	District Governor of Safed Sanjak and timar holder for various others, Tayy tribal leader and founder of Turabay dynasty	Ottoman Palestine (vicinity of Nablus)	c. late 15th -mid-16th centuries
Eliyahu de Vidas	Religion (Judaism)	Kabbalist	Safed	1518-1587
Bezalel Ashkenazi	Religion (Judaism)	Talmudist	Jerusalem	c. 1520-1592
Al-Tamartashi	Religion (Islam)	Hanafi scholar	Old City of Gaza	1532-1598
Isaac Luria	Religion (Judaism)	Lurianic Kabbalah	Jerusalem	c. 1534-1572
Elazar ben Moshe Azikri	Religion (Judaism)	Moralist, poet	Safed	1533-1600
Ahmad Pasha ibn Ridwan	Politics	District Governor of Gaza (1585-1605) from the Ridwan dynasty	Gaza	d. 1607
Hayyim ben Joseph Vital	Religion (Judaism)	Lurianic Kabbalah	Safed	1542-1620
Samuel ben Isaac de Uçeda	Religion (Judaism)	Talmudist, exegete	Safed	1545-1604
Gedaliah Cordovero	Religion (Judaism)	Talmudic scholar	Safed	1562-1625
Mar'i al-Karmi	Religion (Islam)	Hanbali scholar	Tulkarem	1580–1624
Joseph Trani	Religion (Judaism)	Liturgy, talmud	Safed	1568-1639
Khayr al-Din al-Ramli	Religion (Islam)	Hanbali jurist	Ramla	c.1585
Domenico Gerosolimitano	Religion	Neophyte censor	Safed	fl. 1590s
Al-Khalidi Al-Safadi	Religion (Islam)	Historian and Hanafi Mufti	Safad	d. 1625
Moshe ben Yonatan Galante	Religion (Judaism)	Chief rabbi of Jerusalem	Safed	1621-1689
Samuel Primo	Religion (Judaism)	Secretary to Sabbatai Zevi	Jerusalem	c. 1635-1708
Nathan of Gaza	Religion (Judaism)	Sabbatean prophet, poet	Jerusalem	1643-1680
Joseph Shalit Riqueti	Religion (Judaism)	Talmudist	Safed	c. 1650
Israel Ze'evi	Religion (Judaism)	Talmudist	Hebron	1650-1731
Hayyim ben Jacob Abulafia	Religion (Judaism)	Talmudist	Hebron	1660-1744
Musa Pasha ibn Hasan	Politics	Governor of Gaza from the Ridwan dynasty	Ottoman Palestine	c. 1663 - late 1670s
Daher al-Umar	Politics	18th century ruler of the Galilee	Arraba	c.1690
Moses Hagiz	Religion (Judaism)	Talmudist, liturgist, printer	Jerusalem	1671-c. 1750
Isaac HaKohen Rapoport	Religion (Judaism)	Halakhist	Jerusalem	1679-1754
Muhammad ibn Ahmad al-Saffarini	Religion (Islam)	Hanbali cleric, jurist, historian	Saffarin, Nablus	c. 1701-1774
Raphael Meyuchas ben Shmuel	Religion (Judaism)	Chief rabbi (1756-1771)	Jerusalem	c. 1705-1771
Jonah Nabon	Religion (Judaism)	Talmudist	Jerusalem	1713-1760
Husayn Pasha ibn Makki	Politics	District governor of Gaza (1763-1765)	Gaza	d. 1765
Chaim Yosef David Azulai	Religion (Judaism)	Talmudist, bibliographer	Jerusalem	1724-1806
Jacob Alyashar	Religion (Judaism	Talmudist	Hebron	1730-c. 1790
Raphael Hayyim Isaac Carregal	Religion (Judaism)	Rabbi and emissary	Hebron	1733-1777
Mohammad Abu Maraq	Politics	Governor of Gaza and Jaffa	Gaza or Hebron	c. 1799-1804
Moshe Yosef Mordechai Meyuchas	Religion (Judaism)	Chief rabbi (1802-1805)	Jerusalem	1738-1805
Nathan Adadi	Religion (Judaism)	Halakhist		1740-1818
Mustafa Bey Tuqan	Politics	Mutasallim of Nablus	Ottoman Palestine	c. 1742-1823
Amram ben Diwan	Religion (Judaism)	Talmudist	Jerusalem	1743-1782
'Abd Rabbo al-Ta'amireh	Politics	Bedouin leader, one of several members of the Ta'amireh tribe to resist Napoleon	Ottoman Palestine, area of Bethlehem	c. 1799
Mas'ud al-Madi	Politics	Shaykh of Ijzim, governor of Gaza	Ijzim(?)	d. 1834
Qasim al-Ahmad	Politics	Mutasallim of Nablus and Jerusalem, leader in the Peasants' revolt in Palestine	Ottoman Palestine (Sidon Eyalet), Beit Wazan	d. 1834
Shlomo Moshe Suzin	Religion (Judaism)	Chief rabbi	Jerusalem	d. 1835
Husayn Abd al-Hadi	Politics	Mudir of Sidon Eyalet	Arraba	d. c. 1835-6
Chaim Nissim Abulafia	Religion (Judaism)	Chief rabbi	Tiberias	1775-1851
Isaac Kovo	Religion (Judaism	Chief rabbi	Jerusalem	1770-1854
Abdelrahman al-Dajani	Politics	Mayor of Jerusalem (1863-1882)	Jerusalem	c. 19th century
Yehuda Navon	Religion (Judaism)	Chief rabbi	Jerusalem	d. 1844
Abdallah Pasha ibn Ali	Politics	Wali of Sidon Eyalet	Akka	b. 1801 (exiled)
Musa Faidi al-Alami	Politics	Mayor of Jerusalem (1869, 1879-1881)	Jerusalem	d. 1881
Joseph Shabbethai Farhi	Religion (Judaism)	Talmudist, kabbalist	Jerusalem	1802-1882
Yedidyah Raphael Chai Abulafiya	Religion (Judaism)	Kabbalah	Jerusalem	1807-1869
Moses Pardo	Religion (Judaism)	Talmudist	Jerusalem	1810-1888
Jacob Valero	Finance	Sephardic banker and founder of the Valero banking family in Jerusalem	Jerusalem	1813-1874
Yaakov Shaul Elyashar	Religion (Judaism)	Sephardic chief rabbi	Safed	1817-1906
Aharon Azriel	Religion (Judaism)	Kabbalist	Jerusalem	1818-1879
Aqil Agha	Politics	Local lord in the area of the Galilee, centered around Ibillin (1847–64)	Gaza or Nazareth	c. 1820 -1870
Jacob Saphir	Religion (Judaism)	Rabbi, ethnographer, traveller	Ashmyany, Russian Empire	1822–1886
Isaac ben Moses Abulafia	Religion (Judaism)	Halakhist	Tiberias	1824-1910
Chaim Hezekiah Medini	Religion (Judaism)	Halakhist	Jerusalem	1834-1904
Yosef Rivlin	Religion (Judaism)	Rabbi, director of the Central Committee of Knesseth Israel	Jerusalem	1836-1896
Yoel Moshe Salomon	Journalist	Co-founder of HaLevanon	Jerusalem	1838-1912
Yousef al-Khalidi	Politics	Mayor of Jerusalem,Ottoman parliamentarian, author	Jerusalem	1842-1906
Mohammed Tahir al-Husayni	Religion (Islam)	Grand Mufti of Jerusalem (1865-1908)	Jerusalem	1842-1908
Salim al-Husayni	Politics	Mayor of Jerusalem (1882-1897)	Jerusalem	d. 1908
Mariam Baouardy	Religion (Christianity)	Modern saint / miracle	Hurfeish	1846
Yehoshua Stampfer	Politics	Zionist activist, founder of Petah Tikva	Komárno, Kingdom of Hungary	1852-1908
Ruhi Khalidi	Politics	Member of the Ottoman Parliament representing Jerusalem	Old City of Jerusalem	1864-1913
Shimon Moyal	Medicine and Politics	Physician, publisher, journalist	Jaffa	1866-1915
Aaron Aaronsohn	Agronomy, politics	Agronomist and Zionist activist, discoverer of emmer	Bacău, Principality of Romania	1876-1919
Avshalom Feinberg	Politics	Zionist activist, British spy	Gedera, Ottoman Palestine	1889-1917
Husayn al-Husseini	Politics	Mayor of Jerusalem (1909-1917)	Jerusalem	d. 1917
Sarah Aaronsohn	Politics	Zionist activist, British spy	Zikhron Ya'akov, Ottoman Palestine	1890-1917
