= Byzantine literature of the Justinian era =

Byzantine literature from the reign of Justinian I to the Heraclian dynasty

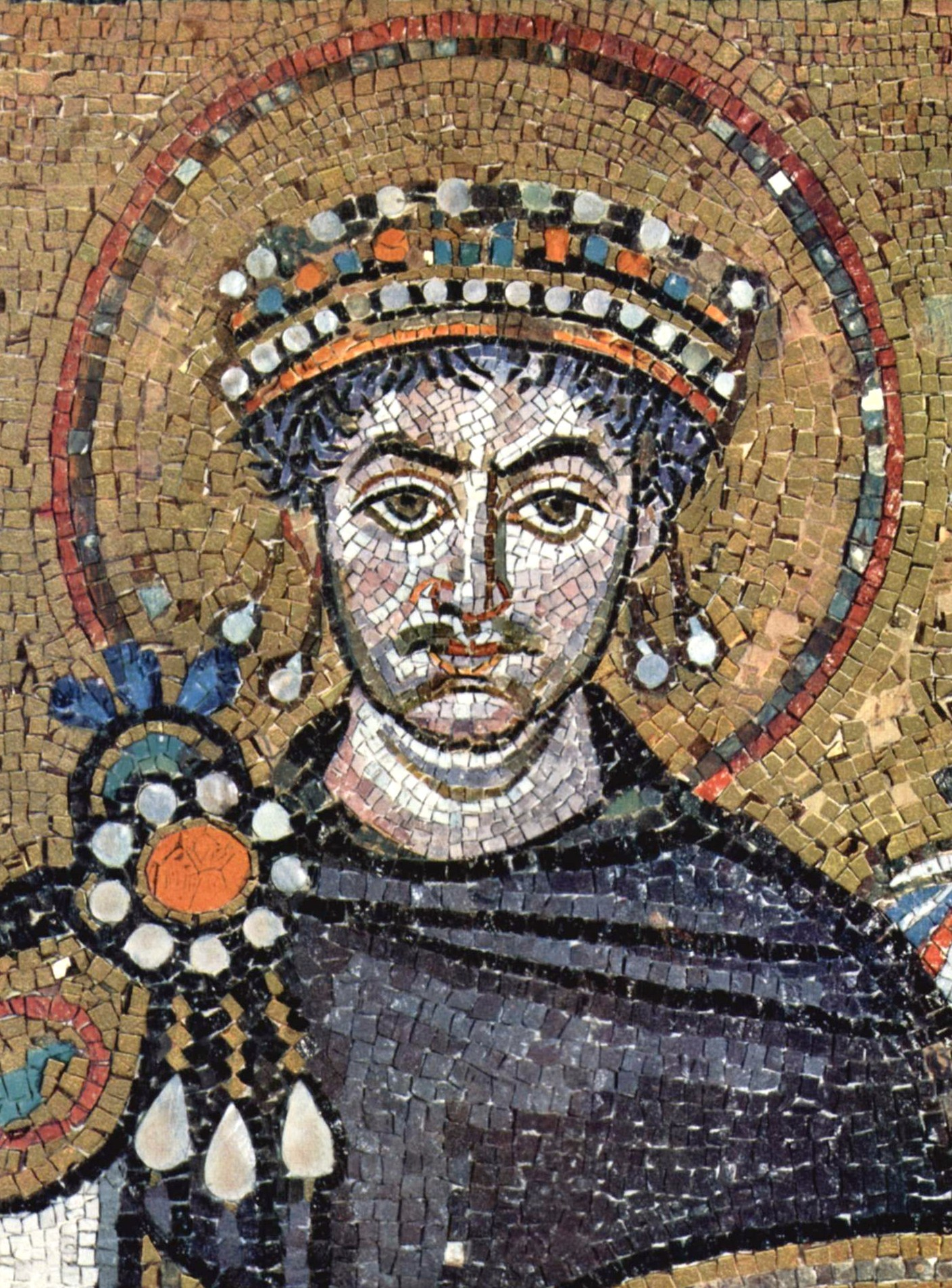
Emperor Justinian I

Byzantine literature of the Justinian era refers to the period of Byzantine literature from the accession of Emperor Justinian I in 527 to the rise of the Heraclian dynasty in 610.

The prosperity of the Byzantine Empire under Emperor Justinian I (527–565) coincided with a comprehensive flourishing of Byzantine literature. The emperor's victorious wars were chronicled by Procopius in his History of the Wars. This work was continued by Agathias in On the Reign of Justinian, covering events from 552 to 558. Menander Protector extended this narrative in his Histories up to 582. The same period was addressed by Theophanes of Byzantium. Two contemporaries of Procopius, Peter the Patrician and John the Lydian, documented the history of the Roman Empire. Church historians active during this period included Theodorus Lector, John of Ephesus, and Evagrius Scholasticus. The Syrian monk John Malalas authored the Chronicle, a history of humanity from creation, establishing a new and quite popular literary genre in Byzantium.

Theological works of the 6th century engaged with the christological controversies of the previous century. Contributors included Emperor Justinian I, Leontius of Byzantium, Ephraim of Antioch, and Anastasius I of Antioch, patriarch of Antioch. Ascetic literature was advanced by desert monks, notably John Climacus, author of the widely read Ladder of Divine Ascent, Simeon Stylites the Younger, and Dorotheus of Gaza. Hagiographic works, primarily focused on desert monks, were exemplified by the lives written by Cyril of Scythopolis and the Spiritual Meadow by John Moschus.

In poetry, the lyrical genius Romanos the Melodist, a monk serving as a melodos in a Constantinopolitan church, stood out. Author of numerous kontakia, he is also considered the creator of the Akathist Hymn to the Theotokos, the most famous liturgical hymn in Orthodox liturgy. Epigrammatic poetry flourished, with notable contributors including Agathias, Paul the Silentiary, Macedonius, and Julian the Egyptian. Ekphraseis by John of Gaza and Paul the Silentiary also enjoyed significant readership.

Philosophy, both Platonic and Aristotelian, thrived in schools in Athens and Gaza. John Philoponus, a leading figure in Gaza, alongside Leontius of Byzantium, significantly applied Aristotelian philosophy to theology. An anonymous monk, writing under the pseudonym Pseudo-Dionysius the Areopagite, produced four Neoplatonic treatises that shaped medieval mysticism. Stephanus of Byzantium compiled a 60-volume geographical dictionary, Ethnica. Cosmas Indicopleustes' Christian Topography held importance for medieval culture. John Philoponus also contributed works in philology, medicine, and mathematics. Other scholars included the philologist John Charax, physicians Aetius of Amida and Alexander of Tralles, and mathematicians Domninus of Larissa and Marinus of Neapolis.

== Historians and chroniclers ==
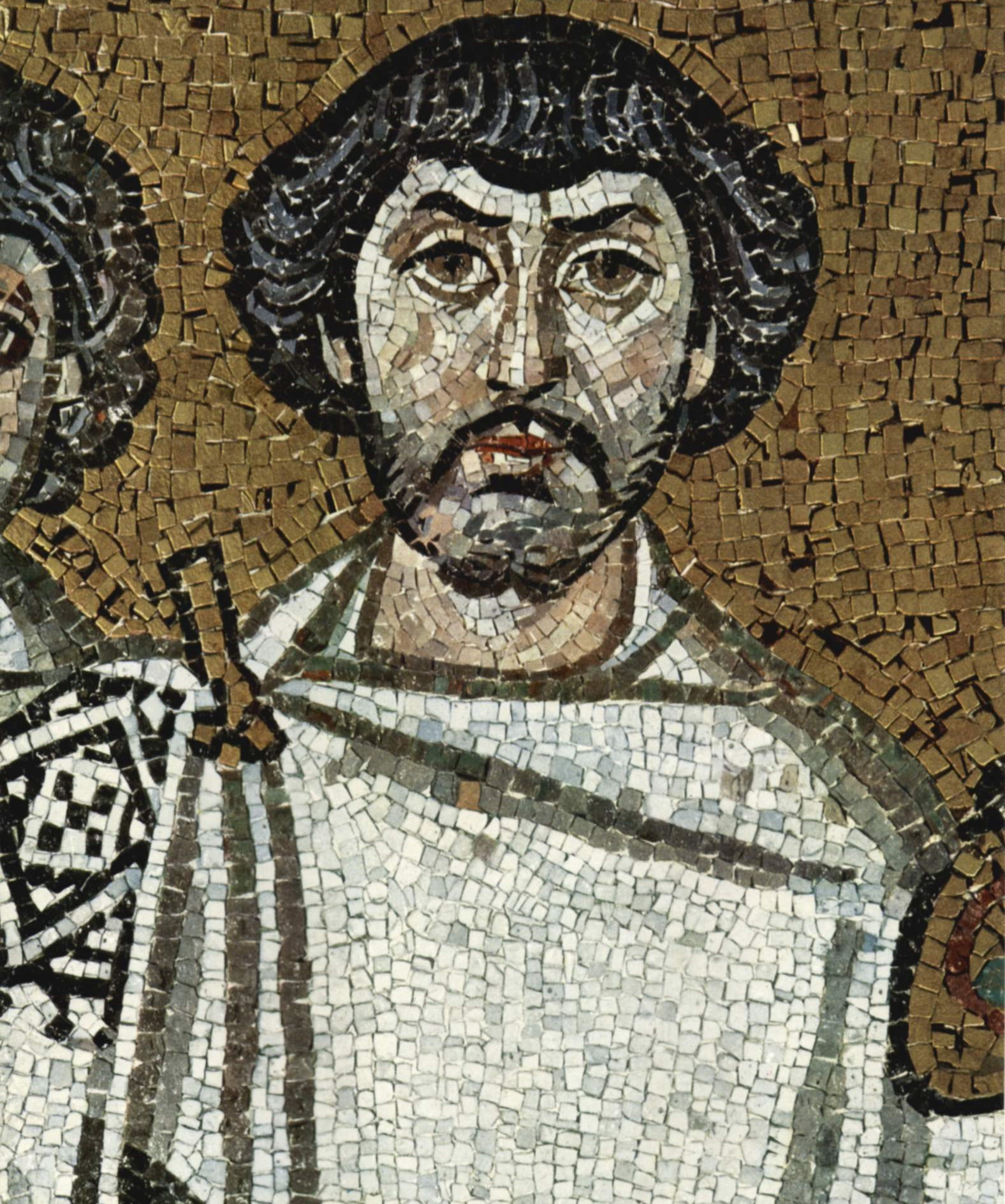
Belisarius, Justinian's general, central to Procopius' works

Byzantine historiography of the Justinian era continued the esteemed traditions of earlier Greek historiography. Written by educated individuals, often imperial officials, it recorded contemporary events based on documents and eyewitness accounts. The foremost historian, Procopius (490/507–after 562), a participant in Belisarius' campaigns and later a high-ranking official, authored the eight-book History of the Wars (545–554), detailing Belisarius' wars against Persia, the Vandals in Africa, and the Ostrogoths in Italy. The final book covered empire-wide events from 551 to 553. Procopius also wrote The Buildings (553–555), cataloguing Justinian's constructions, and the Secret History, a scathing critique of the imperial couple and Belisarius, rediscovered after 450 years. While Procopius used literary Greek, his contemporaries Peter the Patrician (c. 500–564) and John the Lydian (490–565?) wrote in the vernacular (demotic). Peter, a senior official and diplomat, left Histories covering Rome from 43 to 358 and On State Organization. John, a professor and official, wrote On the Magistracies of the Roman State (559), tracing Rome's political and institutional history from Aeneas to the empire's fall. Agathias (after 536–585), a rhetorician and poet, continued Procopius' work in the five-book On the Reign of Justinian (552–558), covering the Gothic wars and Persian conflicts. Menander Protector's Histories (583–584) extended the narrative from 558 to 582. Fragments survive from works by Theophanes of Byzantium, whose Historikà covered the reigns of Justin II and Tiberius I (566–581), and John of Epiphania, whose Histories detailed Byzantine-Persian wars from 571 to 593.

Church historiography remained vibrant. Theodorus Lector, a lector at Hagia Sophia, compiled a Church History (c. 530) for 439–527, of which only fragments remain. The Monophysite bishop John of Ephesus (d. c. 586) wrote a Syriac Ecclesiastical History from its origins to 585, with only the final book surviving. The era's leading church historian, Evagrius Scholasticus (after 536–after 600), a lawyer, authored a Ecclesiastical History from the Council of Ephesus (431) to 593, set against a broad political backdrop. Byzantine church historiography paused after Evagrius, resuming only in the 14th century with Nicephorus Callistus Xanthopulus.

The Universal Chronicle by John Malalas (c. 491–c. 578), a Syrian, initiated a distinct historical genre. Covering history from Adam and Eve, it blended anecdotes, independent tales, and material from both historical and literary sources. Naive and uncritical, it gained immense popularity as a people's history book, written in demotic Greek, and influenced Byzantine chroniclers until the 12th century. Another chronicler, Hesychius of Miletus, wrote the Compendium of Universal History up to 518, mostly lost, and the Nomenclature, a chronological list of notable Greek writers.

== Theologians, ascetics, and hagiographers ==
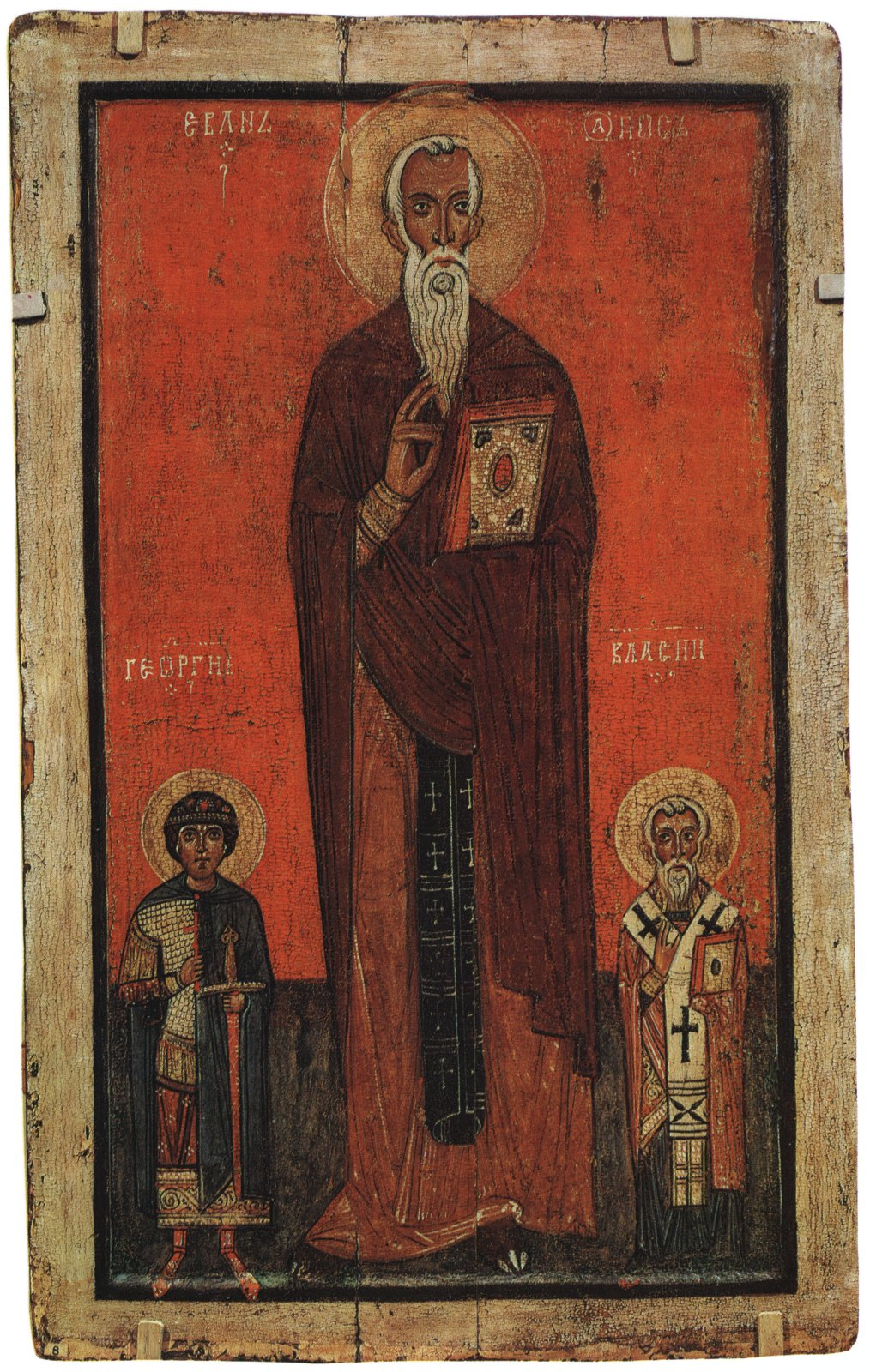
Saint John Climacus

Theological writing in the 6th century largely continued the christological debates of the 5th century, often inspired by Emperor Justinian I (527–565), who actively engaged in these disputes. His notable works include the Book Against Origen, the Edict Against the Three Chapters targeting Theodore of Mopsuestia, Theodoret, and Ibas of Edessa, and the Treatise Against the Monophysites. A prominent theologian and defender of orthodoxy, Leontius of Byzantium (c. 485–544), a former Nestorian and later monk at the Lavra of St. Sabbas in Jerusalem, wrote Three Books Against the Nestorians and Eutychians (543–544), polemicizing against Nestorians, Monophysites, and Aphthartodocetes. His Explanations of Severus' Assertions countered the leading Monophysite writer of the period. Leontius introduced Aristotelian logic into theological arguments, advancing Byzantine scholasticism. Ephraim of Amida, patriarch of Antioch (527–545), supported Justinian's religious policies, though only fragments of his three Volumes survive. In contrast, Anastasius I, patriarch of Antioch (557–570, 593–599), opposed the emperor, combating Monophysite-Aphthartodocetes and the tritheist John Philoponus in his writings.

From the monks of Egypt, Palestine, and Syria emerged distinguished ascetic writers. John Climacus (c. 525–c. 600), a Sinaitic monk, authored The Ladder of Divine Ascent, guiding monks toward perfection through hesychia (peaceful prayer). Written in simple language, it was highly popular in later centuries. Simeon Stylites the Younger (c. 521–592), an ascetic living atop a pillar near Antioch, and Dorotheus of Gaza, with his extensive Various Instructions Beneficial to the Soul, addressing monastic life, were also notable.

Hagiography was advanced primarily by monks. Cyril of Scythopolis (c. 524–after 599), a monk at the Lavra of St. Euthymius in Judaea, wrote four major lives between 554 and 556, including those of his mentor Sabbas the Sanctified, Euthymius the Great, John the Hesychast, and Cyriacus. John Moschus (c. 550–619), from Damascus, explored Palestinian, Egyptian, and Syrian ascetic communities between 568 and 578, documenting their lives, sayings, and proverbs in the Spiritual Meadow.

== Poets ==
Greek poetry evolved significantly from the 4th to 6th centuries. The disappearance of quantitative syllable length equalized vowel pronunciation, and the pitch accent shifted to a stress accent, rendering traditional metrical schemes obsolete. New systems based on syllable count and stress emerged, leading to isosyllabic folk verse (stichic, kata stíchon) and anisosyllabic verse (kata períodon) for rhythmic sequences. Classical forms like dactylic hexameter or iamb persisted through syllabotonic verse, where stress replaced quantity.

Poetry adapted to social changes. Pagan religious poetry became a school exercise, while Christian poetry, rooted in faith and inner experience, flourished. Secular poetry celebrated centralized state achievements, praising new buildings and emperors, and entertained with epigrams and anacreontics.

=== Religious poets ===
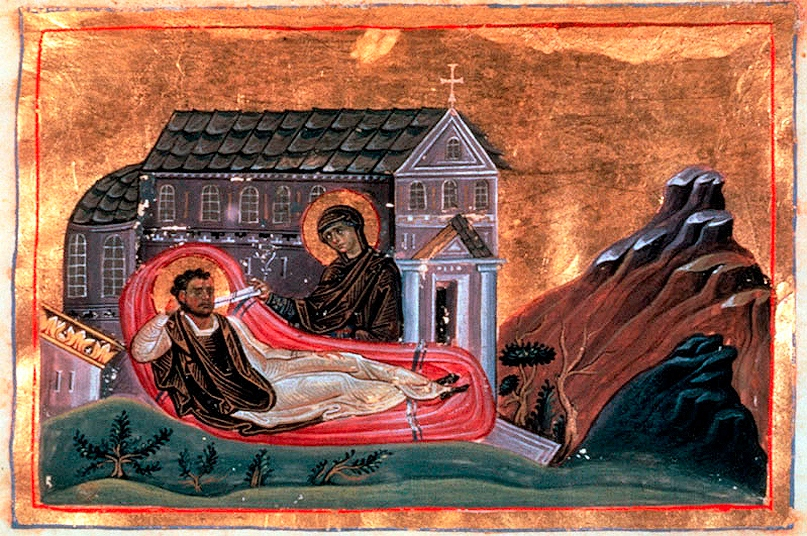
Romanos the Melodist receives from the Blessed Virgin Mary the gift of composing hymns

By the late 5th century, simple liturgical troparia evolved into the more complex kontakion, comprising from 18 to 24 stanzas preceded by an introduction, often forming acrostics. Kontakia, blending lyrical-dramatic sermons with narrative, peaked in the 6th and 7th centuries. Contributors included Justinian I, Anastasius, Cyriacus, and St. Martha, mother of Simeon Stylites the Younger. The preeminent poet, Romanos the Melodist, a Syrian from Emesa and later a melodos at the Church of the Theotokos in Constantinople (d. after 550), produced 88 kontakia, 34 on Christ, others on church feasts, biblical events, saints, and patristic homilies, some polemicizing against heresies. He is likely the author of the Akáthistos Hýmnos, a 24-stanza hymn to the Theotokos, a pinnacle of Byzantine liturgy.

=== Ekphrastic poets ===
Ekphraseis, descriptive poems of rivers, seas, mountains, monuments, and cities, remained popular. Rooted in Greek paradoxography, elevated by Antigonus of Carystus in the 3rd century BCE, the genre captivated Byzantine readers. John of Gaza, a grammar teacher, wrote a poetic Description of the World Map in a public bath built by Bishop Marcian in Gaza (526–536). Paul the Silentiary penned the Description of Hagia Sophia and its Choir Podium, alongside a didactic poem, On the Hot Springs of Pythia, celebrating a Bithynian spa.

=== Epigrammatists ===
The 6th century marked a peak for Byzantine epigrams – witty, pointed verses. Agathias, a rhetorician and historian, excelled with about 100 epigrams, published in the Anthology of New Epigrams, the first thematically arranged collection. His works spanned love poems, convivial, votive, funerary, and display epigrams. Paul the Silentiary's 78 epigrams, mostly erotic and often bold, survived. Macedonius of Thessalonica's 44 epigrams were conventional love poems. Julian the Egyptian, a subprefect, crafted 70 epigrams, primarily funerary. Agathias' anthology also included works by Arabius Scholasticus, Eratosthenes Scholasticus, Eutolmius Scholasticus, Ireneus Referendarius, Isidore Scholasticus, John Barbucallus, Julian Anticensor, Leontius Scholasticus, and Theotetus Scholasticus.

== Philosophers, geographers, philologists, and others ==
Byzantine philosophers of the 6th century built on ancient schools, enriching theology. Gazan philosophers Aeneas of Gaza, Procopius of Gaza, and Zacharias Rhetor debated with Platonic Academy, closed by Justinian in 529. David the Invincible and Elias focused on interpretation, while Ammonius Hermiae wrote the first Byzantine commentary on Porphyry of Tyre's Isagoge. John Philoponus, Ammonius' student from Caesarea and later bishop of Alexandria, produced commentaries on Aristotle and Porphyry, alongside original works. His Arbiter proposed a tritheistic Trinitarian view, On the Creation of the World favored biblical cosmology over Aristotle, Against Proclus on the Eternity of the World refuted eternalism, and Disputations on Easter refined Easter calculations. The late 5th to early 6th-century Neoplatonist Pseudo-Dionysius the Areopagite, posing as a disciple of Paul the Apostle, authored four theological-philosophical treatises: On the Divine Names outlined dual paths to knowing God; Mystical Theology, rooted in Neoplatonic mysticism, shaped medieval mysticism; Celestial Hierarchy developed angelology; and Ecclesiastical Hierarchy addressed church structure. Agapetus the Deacon's Exposition of Admonitions for Emperor Justinian, a medieval "mirror" of moral, religious, and political guidance, is sometimes considered philosophical.

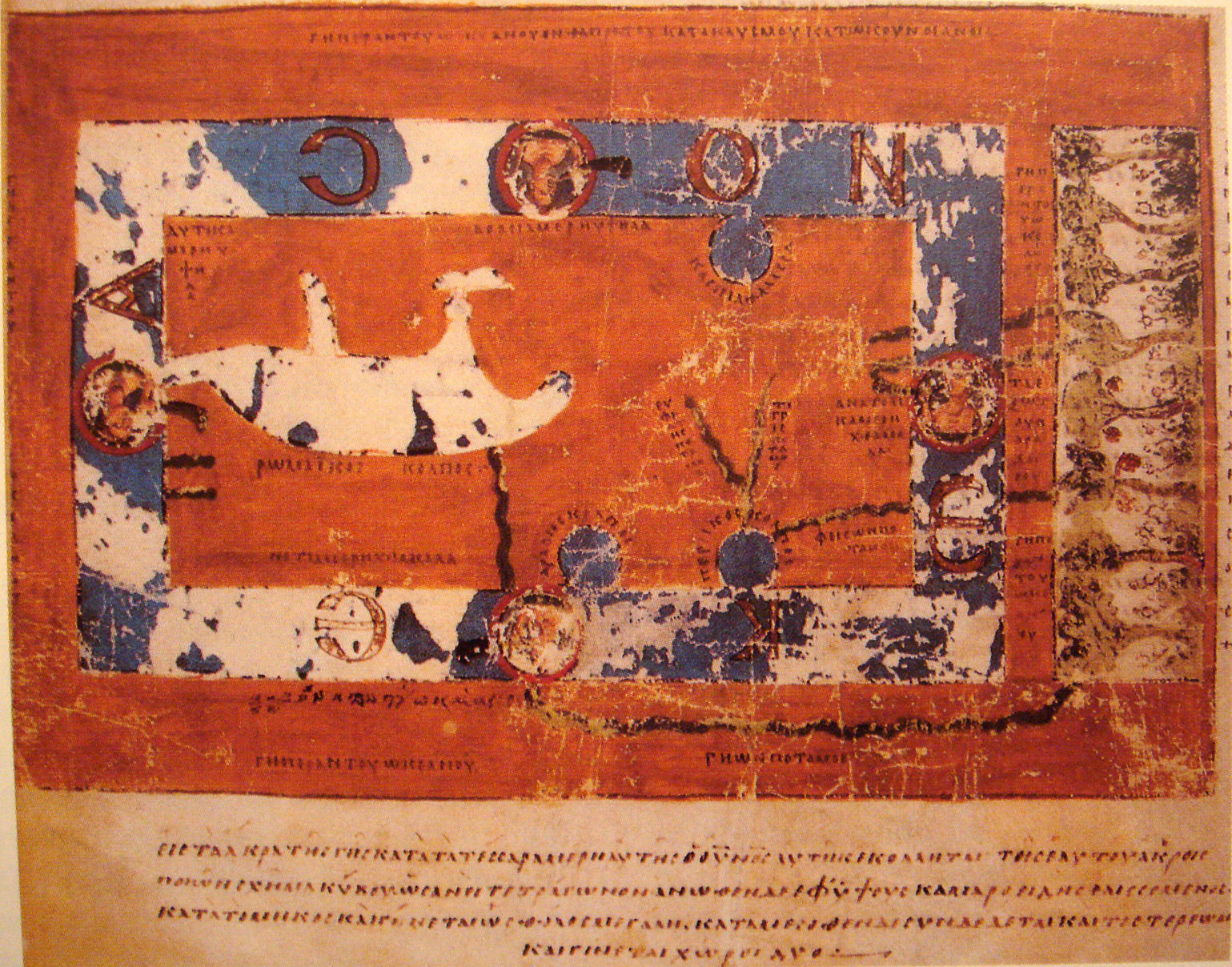
World map by Cosmas Indicopleustes

Stephanus of Byzantium's 60-volume geographical dictionary, Ethnica, detailed Byzantine locales, blending geography, history, literature, and notable figures. Cosmas Indicopleustes of Alexandria, in his Christian Topography, defended Ptolemy's geocentric model with biblical support, presenting a rectangular earth under a crystal-domed sky, influencing Byzantine architecture and readers for centuries. Grammarian Hierocles published Synecdemus before 535, a statistical overview of the empire, while George of Cyprus wrote a 7th-century Description of the empire.

The 6th century saw specialized scholarly works. John Philoponus wrote philological studies (On Accent and a semantic Dictionary), medical treatises (On Pulse and On Fever), and a commentary on Nicomachus' Introduction to Arithmetic. John Charax researched word morphology. Aëtius of Amida summarized medical knowledge in Sixteen Books on Medicine, drawing from Galen, Oribasius, Dioscorides, and personal experience. Alexander of Tralles produced a 12-book Pathology and Therapy of Internal Diseases and treatises on Intestinal Parasites and Eye Diseases. Domninus of Larissa wrote a Manual of Introductory Arithmetic, and Marinus of Neapolis prefaced Euclid's Elements of Geometry.

== Bibliography ==
- Jurewicz, O. (1984). Historia literatury bizantyńskiej [History of Byzantine Literature] (in Polish). Wrocław: Ossolineum. ISBN 978-83-04-01422-0.
