= Neoplatonism and Christianity =

Neoplatonism was a major influence on Christian theology throughout Late Antiquity and the Middle Ages in the East, and sometimes in the West as well. In the East, major Greek Fathers like Basil, Gregory of Nyssa and Gregory of Nazianzus were influenced by Platonism and Neoplatonism, but also Stoicism often leading towards asceticism and harsh treatment of the body, for example stylite asceticism. In the West, St. Augustine of Hippo was influenced by the early Neoplatonists Plotinus and Porphyry. Later on, in the East, the works of the Christian writer Pseudo-Dionysius the Areopagite, who was influenced by later Neoplatonists such as Proclus and Damascius, became a critical work on which Greek church fathers based their theology, like Maximus believing it was an original work of Dionysius the Areopagite.

== Late Antiquity ==
Early Christians including Origen, Gregory of Nyssa, and Augustine were influenced by Neoplatonism, but none accepted it uncritically and they rejected absolute monism and its emanationists' views. Certain central tenets of Neoplatonism served as a philosophical interim for the Christian theologian Augustine of Hippo on his journey from dualistic Manichaeism to Christianity. As a Manichee, Augustine had held that evil has substantial being and that God is made of matter; when he became a Neoplatonist, he changed his views on these things. As a Neoplatonist, and later a Christian, Augustine believed that evil is a privation of good and that God is not material. Perhaps more importantly, the emphasis on mystical contemplation as a means to directly encounter God or the One, found in the writings of Plotinus and Porphyry, deeply affected Augustine. According to his own account of his important discovery of 'the books of the Platonists' in Confessions Book 7, Augustine owes his conception of both God and the human soul as incorporeal substance to Neoplatonism. But Augustine was also critical of Neoplatonism doctrines and their formulations, and he rejected the Neoplatonists' immaterialism.

Other Christians assimilated Neoplatonist ideas, especially in their identifying the Neoplatonic One, or God, with Yahweh. The most influential of these would be Origen, who potentially took classes from Ammonius Saccas (but this is not certain because there may have been a different philosopher, now called Origen the Pagan, at the same time), and the late 5th century author known as Pseudo-Dionysius the Areopagite.

Neoplatonism also had links with Gnosticism, which Plotinus rebuked in his ninth tractate of the second Enneads: "Against Those That Affirm The Creator of The Kosmos and The Kosmos Itself to Be Evil" (Note: Ancient Greek: Προς τους κακον τον Δημιουργον του κοσμου και τον κοσμον κακον ειναι λεγοντας) (generally known as "Against The Gnostics"). (Note: Ancient Greek: Προς τους Γνωστικους)

Due to their belief being grounded in Platonic thought, the neoplatonists rejected Gnosticism's vilification of Plato's demiurge, the creator of the material world or cosmos discussed in the Timaeus. Although neoplatonism has been referred to as orthodox Platonic philosophy by scholars like Professor John D. Turner, this reference may be due in part to Plotinus' attempt to refute certain interpretations of Platonic philosophy, through his Enneads. Plotinus believed the followers of gnosticism had corrupted the original teachings of Plato.

Despite the influence this philosophy had on Christianity, Justinian I would hurt later neoplatonism by ordering the closure of the refounded Academy of Athens in 529. Nevertheless, members of the rhetorical school of Gaza such as Aeneas of Gaza or Procopius of Gaza would synthesize neoplatonism with early orthodox Christian ideas without any disturbances.

== Middle Ages ==
Pseudo-Dionysius proved significant for both the Byzantine and Roman branches of Christianity. His works were translated into Latin by John Scotus Eriugena in the 9th century.

== Neo-Platonism in Orthodox theology ==
From the days of the Early Church until the present, the Eastern Orthodox Church has made positive selective use of ancient Greek philosophy, particularly Socrates, Plato, Aristotle and the Stoics. For example, the term logos (Greek Λόγος) originated with Heraclitus and meant reason or thought. In the Christian context, Logos takes on a deeper meaning and becomes a name for the second person of the Trinity. The writer and theologian Gregory Palamas in the 14th century gave four distinct meanings for the term. The most important principle is that early Christianity developed in a Greek milieu and a common vocabulary was used in philosophical, spiritual and theological writing. However, the meanings of words sometimes evolved along different lines. In other cases, philosophical ideas and concepts were sometimes adapted and changed by Christian writers. Any exegetical endeavor trying to unravel the influence of neoplatonic thought on Christian theology needs to keep these principles in mind. One should also note that philosophy was used quite differently in the Eastern and Western theological traditions.

The writings attributed to Dionysius the Areopagite are among the most enigmatic works of late antiquity. Byzantine scholars such as Gregory Palamas cited Dionysius especially in matters of Mystical Theology such as theoria, the divine energies and the unknowability of God. At present, modern theologians and philosophers are still debating whether Dionysius was a Neoplatonist with Christian influences or a Christian writer with Neoplatonic influences. Among Orthodox scholars, the latter view seems to be shared by such writers as Andrew Louth and Vladimir Lossky. However, other Orthodox scholars such as John Meyendorff believe that the Neoplatonism of Dionysius exerted both positive and negative influences on Orthodox theology. Meyendorff maintains that Dionysius has led to some confusion in the areas of liturgical and ecclesiological formulations.

== Renaissance ==
Marsilio Ficino, who translated Plotinus, Proclus, as well as Plato's complete works into Latin, was the central figure of a major Neoplatonist revival in the Renaissance. His friend, Giovanni Pico della Mirandola, was also a major figure in this movement. Both were students of Jewish mystical Kabbalah, which was heavily influenced by neoplatonism. Renewed interest in Plotinian philosophy contributed to the rational theology and philosophy of the "Cambridge Platonist" circle (B. Whichcote, R. Cudworth, J. Smith, H. More, etc.). Renaissance Neoplatonism also overlapped with or graded into various forms of Christian esotericism.

== See also ==
- Augustine of Hippo
- Augustinian soteriology
- Basil the Great
- Cambridge Platonists
- Cappadocian Fathers
- Christ the Logos
- Christian materialism
- Gregory of Nazianzus
- Gregory of Nyssa
- Irenaeus
- Maximus Confessor
- Neoplatonism and Gnosticism
- Origen
- Pseudo-Dionysius
- Allegorical interpretations of Plato
