= Gaza Triad =

Three sixth century Christian theologians

The Gaza Triad refers collectively to Aeneas of Gaza, Procopius of Gaza and Zacharias Scholasticus. The three were sixth century Christian theologians from Gaza. Aeneas (died c. 518) was a Christian neo-platonist who defended the Christian doctrine of the resurrection against pagan attacks. Procopius (465–528) wrote biblical commentaries in catena form. Zacharius (died c. 540) was a philosopher and early church historian.
