= List of people from Palestine =

List of people from Palestine may refer to:

- List of Palestinians
- List of people from Palestine (historical region)
