= Martyrs of Palestine =

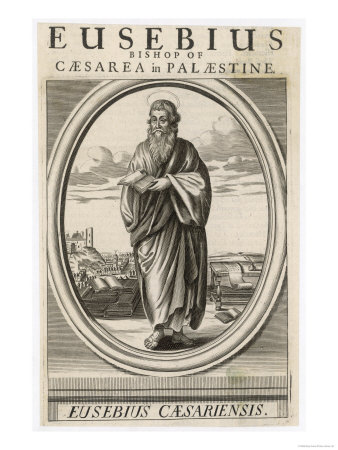
Antique engraving of Eusebius of Caesarea

On the Martyrs of Palestine is a work by church historian and Bishop of Caesarea, Eusebius (AD 263 – 339), relating the persecution of Christians in Caesarea under Roman Emperor Diocletian. The work survives in two forms, a shorter recension which formed part of his Ecclesiastical History, and a longer version, discovered only in 1866. Eusebius was present in Caesarea at the time of the persecutions he recounts.

== Background ==
The shorter version of Martyrs of Palestine was probably a revision of the longer recension. It is possible that both extant versions are only fragments of a now lost longer work. The long recension was composed sometime after 311, when the persecutions in Caesarea had ceased, and published in 315–316.

== Short recension ==
Although shorter than the other version, there are accounts of martyrdoms in Caesarea that are not contained in the long recension, such as the voluntary martyrdoms of Timolaus and Companions.

== Long recension ==
The long version differs from the short one most remarkably in how it is written from a localized perspective. Eusebius refer to "our city of Caesarea" (as opposed to "the city" in the short version), and uses "this our country" to refer to Palestine.

The cruelty of the persecutors, the endurance and suffering of the martyrs, are entered into in greater detail in the longer version.

He ends the long work by expressing his hope that he can represent "our land" to Christians elsewhere in the world and through this work make "the whole people of Palestine" (Syriac: ˁammā kullēh d-Pallistīnā) proud.

== Reliability ==
Eusebius openly states that he is not going to discuss anything that does not "vindicate the divine judgement" and will relate only those things "which may be useful first to ourselves and afterwards to posterity", which caused 18th-century historian Edward Gibbon to distrust the work altogether. However, in the 19th century, historian Joseph Barber Lightfoot commended Eusebius in such passages for his honesty.

== See also ==
Martyrs from Eusebius' book with Wikipedia articles:

- Alphaeus and Zacchaeus
- Agapius (died 306)
- Agapius of Palestine, killed in 303 or 304 along with Timolaus and companions (two by the name Alexander, Dionysius, Plæsius, and Romulus), and another Dionysius.
- Peter Apselamus
- Procopius of Scythopolis
- Romanus of Caesarea
- Silvanus of Gaza (hieromartyr)
