= James Henry Ambrose Griffiths =

American Roman Catholic priest and bishop

His Excellency, The Most Reverend James Henry Ambrose Griffiths
- Auxiliary Bishop of New York; Titular Bishop of Gaza
- Church: Roman Catholic Church
- See: Archdiocese of New York
- Other posts: Titular Bishop of Gaza

Orders
- Ordination: March 12, 1927 by Giuseppe Palica
- Consecration: January 18, 1950 by Francis Spellman, Thomas Molloy and William Arnold

Personal details
- Born: July 16, 1903 Brooklyn, New York, US
- Died: February 24, 1964 (aged 60) Manhattan, New York, US
- Education: Almo Collegio Capranica; Pontifical Gregorian University

Styles of James Henry Ambrose Griffiths
- Reference style: The Most Reverend
- Spoken style: Your Excellency
- Religious style: Monsignor
- Posthumous style: none

James Henry Ambrose Griffiths (July 16, 1903 – February 24, 1964) was an American prelate of the Roman Catholic Church. He served as an auxiliary bishop of the Archdiocese of New York from 1950 to 1964.

== Biography ==
=== Early life and education ===
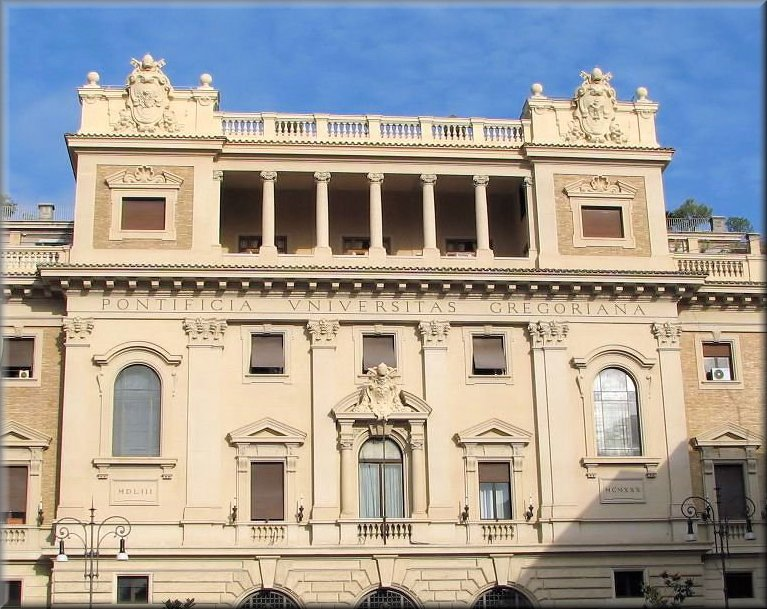
Pontifical Gregorian University, Rome, Italy (2006)

James Griffiths was born on July 16, 1903, in Brooklyn, New York, to James Henry and Helen Agatha (née O'Neil) Griffiths. He received his early education at St. Augustine's Academy in Brooklyn from 1915 to 1919. He then attended St. John's University in Brooklyn, where he earned a Bachelor of Arts in 1923. Griffiths then traveled to Rome to study for the priesthood at the Almo Collegio Capranica and the Pontifical Gregorian University. He received a doctorate in theology from the Gregorian in 1927.

=== Ordination and ministry ===
Griffiths was ordained a priest in Rome on March 12, 1927, for the Diocese of Brooklyn by Archbishop Giuseppe Palica. Following his return to Brooklyn, the diocese assigned Griffiths as curate at St. Joseph's Parish in Babylon, New York. He then served at Our Lady of Mercy Parish in Queens (1928 to 1929) and at St. Augustine's Church in Brooklyn (1929 to 1931). In addition to his pastoral duties, Griffiths worked as an instructor of New Testament scripture at the Dominican Normal School in Amityville, New York, from 1927 to 1929.

Griffiths was named secretary of the diocesan tribunal in 1929, and then he was named its auditor in 1931. From 1935 to 1943, he served as vice-chancellor of the diocese. He also served as diocesan censor of books. The Vatican elevated Griffiths to the rank of papal chamberlain in 1938, and domestic prelate in 1944. One of the co-founders of the Canon Law Society of America in 1939, Griffiths served as its president from 1941 to 1942.

Following the American entry into World War II in 1941, Bishop Thomas Molloy placed Griffiths in charge of supervising the military chaplains from the diocese. He also directed the work of the Vatican Information Service in the diocese, transmitting messages monthly to and from persons in enemy-occupied countries. In November 1943, the Vatican named Griffiths as chancellor of the Military Ordinariate, serving Catholics in the U.S. armed forces throughout the world.

=== Auxiliary Bishop of New York ===
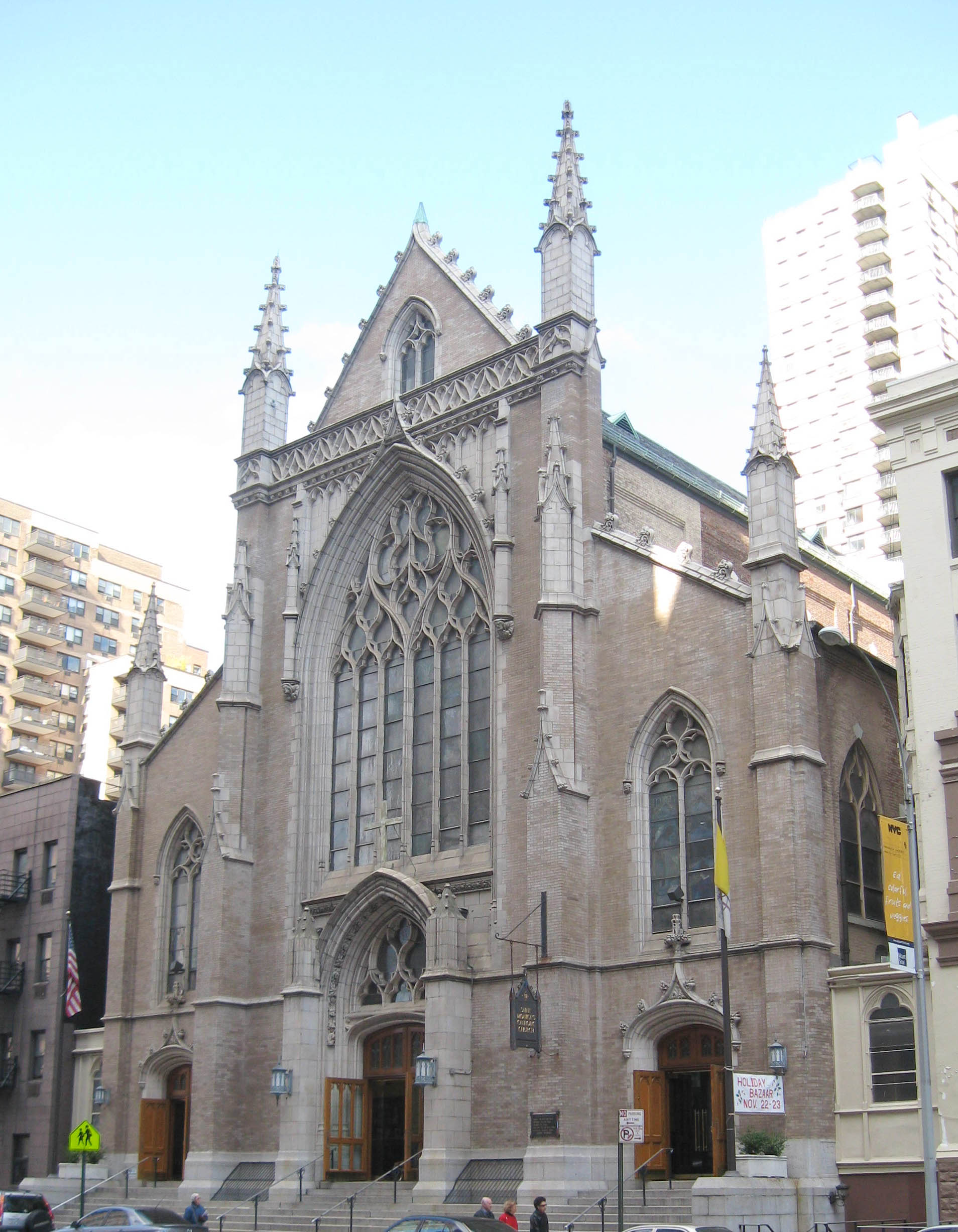
St. Monica's Church, Manhattan (2008)

On October 15, 1949, Griffiths was appointed as an auxiliary bishop of New York and titular bishop of Gaza by Pope Pius XII. He received his episcopal consecration on January 18, 1950, from Cardinal Francis Spellman, with Bishops Thomas Molloy and William Arnold serving as co-consecrators, at St. Patrick's Cathedral in Manhattan. As an auxiliary bishop, he continued to serve as chancellor of the Military Ordinariate until 1955. In March 1952, Spellman appointed Griffiths to the board of archdiocesan consultors. In 1953, the Eisenhower Administration named Griffiths to the Committee on Moral and Spiritual Resources of the International Information Administration, a US government agency that handled overseas information and the Voice of America.

In September 1955, Griffiths was appointed pastor of St. Monica's Parish in Manhattan He represented the Vatican at the United Nations (UN) and was its permanent observer at the Economic and Social Council, a UN agency. He was also a member of the New York City Commission on the United Nations and assistant bishop for United Nations Affairs on the administrative board of the National Catholic Welfare Council. During the Second Vatican Council in Rome from 1962 to 1965, he served on the United States Bishops' Commission on the Liturgical Apostolate, which studied the introduction of English to parts of the mass and other sacraments.

=== Death ===
Griffiths died from a heart attack on February 24, 1964, at the rectory of St. Monica's Church in Manhattan at age 60.

== See also ==
- Catholic Church hierarchy
- Catholic Church in the United States
- Historical list of the Catholic bishops of the United States
- Insignia of chaplain schools in the United States military
- List of Catholic bishops of the United States
- List of Catholic bishops of the United States: military service
- Lists of patriarchs, archbishops, and bishops
- Military chaplain
- Religious symbolism in the United States military
- United States military chaplains

Catholic Church titles
Preceded by –	Auxiliary Bishop of New York; 1949–1955	Succeeded by –
