= Diocese of Gaza =

Roman Catholic titular see

The Diocese of Gaza (Latin: Dioecesis Gazensis) was a bishopric in the Holy Land. Its episcopal see was the city of Gaza and it is now a vacant Latin Catholic titular see.

== Early history ==
According to Dorotheus of Tyre, the first bishop was a certain Philemon who was believed to have been one of the seventy disciples of Jesus and was mentioned by St. Paul. An early bishop called saint Silvanus (not to be confused with Abba Silvanus) is said to have been killed with thirty-nine other martyrs in the copper mines of Phaeno around the year 310. In the early 4th century, the emperor Constantine endowed the town of Maiuma, which formerly had served as Gaza's harbour, with city rights and the status of an episcopal see. Though its city rights were cancelled later, it remained its own bishopric.

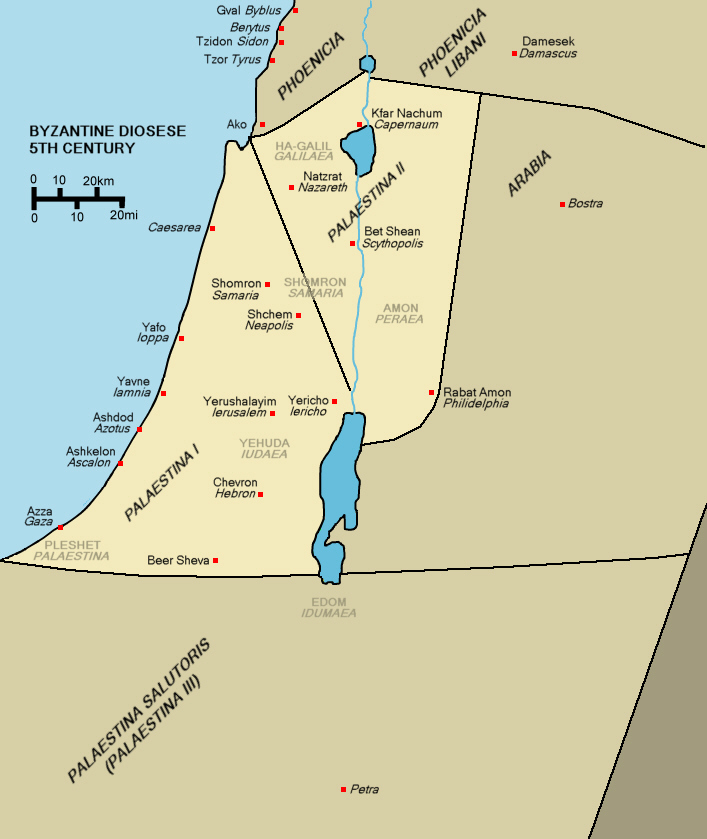
5th century map of Byzantine dioceses of Palestine including Gaza (on the left corner of Palestina I)

The first attested bishop is Asclepias (also Asclepas) of Gaza who is known to have attended the First Council of Nicaea in 325. As an ardent supporter of Athanasius of Alexandria, he was deposed around the year 326 or 327, but was later reinstated at the council of Serdica while Quintianus, who in the meantime had usurped the episcopal see, was excommunicated. As Gaza was still fairly pagan, Asclepias constructed an oratory, later referred to as "Old Church", 2 metres (6 ft 7 in) to the west of the city. His successor Irenaeus seems to have been able to erect a small church in the city, attended the council of Antioch in 363 and is commemorated as a saint.

Under Porphyrius, who became bishop around the year 395, the temple of Marnas and all other pagan temples of the town were closed and destroyed. His successor Netoras attended the council of Ephesus and the council of Chalcedon. After the council of Chalcedon of 451, the ecclesiastical jurisdiction over the dioceses of Palestine, including Gaza, was shifted from the patriarchate of Antioch to the newly created patriarchate of Jerusalem. The next bishop, Cyril, attended a council in Jerusalem in 518.

In the 5th and 6th centuries, Gaza was a renowned center for rhetoric and classical education. In that time, sophists and priests shared the same education; this is exemplified by Marcianus, bishop in the mid-6th century, who was educated at the famous Rhetorical School of Gaza. From the orations of Choricius of Gaza, a fellow student at the school, some details of Marcianus' life are known, as is some information about the obligations of bishops. Quite exceptionally, Marcianus also headed the school for a time, possibly until a "full-time professor" could be found to fill the position.

Marcianus commissioned churches, walls, stoas and bathhouses, defended the citizens from being exploited by soldiers, operated social welfare for the benefit of the poor and went to Constantinople as diplomatic representative of his town. Marcianus was also in close contact with the monastic communities around the town, especially those of the monastery of Seridus. He regularly sought advice from the two hermits Barsanuphius and John the Prophet, such as on who to ordain as priest. Marcianus also attended the council of Jerusalem in 536.

== Middle Ages ==
The next known bishop is Sulayman al-Ghazzi (also known as Solomon of Gaza) who became bishop in his 1080s after having lived through a period of hardship under the caliph al-Hakim who ordered the destruction of the Holy Sepulchre in Jerusalem and the mandatory wearing of discriminatory clothing for Christians. He holds a unique space in the history of Arab Christian literature as he composed a large body of protest devotional poetry in Arabic which was the first collection of Christian religious Arabic poetry in Arabic in the Near East. Sulayman died some time after 1027.

There is no firm evidence of a bishop when the crusaders came into the region. There seems to have been a bishop in Gaza up to 1056 when he was martyred, but no name has been recorded and Gaza seems to have been uninhabited when the crusaders found it. The newly-built town was then given to the Templars but the episcopal see not occupied. However, the pastoral care of the Greeks and Syrians was given over to Meletos, bishop of Eleutheropolis, who then also acted as bishop of Gaza and it seems that the Latins thus considered the see not abandoned.

== Early Modern Period ==
During the 16th century the Christian population of Gaza increased as many Christians of the Transjordan towns migrated to Gaza, making it the biggest Christian city in the region. In 1838, there were only 150 Orthodox families left.

=== Orthodox Metropolitan ===
In 1652, Patriarch Paisius I of Jerusalem, the head of the Greek Orthodox Church of Jerusalem, appointed the Greek scholar and adventurer Paisios Ligarides (c. 1610–1678) as the Metropolitan (bishop) of Gaza. Although a Greek Catholic (a Catholic of the Eastern Rite) cleric in the employ of the Vatican's Propaganda Fide, Ligarides presented himself to the Patriarch as Eastern Orthodox, while maintaining to local Franciscans that he was, in effect, a Catholic acting as a "double agent", working to bring "schismatics" over to Rome; his actual motives are not entirely clear. He never spent a single day in the city of Gaza, absenting himself from his diocese in contravention of church law. By the 1670s, he had been disavowed by the See of Rome and defrocked by the Greek Orthodox Patriarch of Jerusalem.

== Restoration as Titular See ==
In 1895, the diocese was restored as a titular see. Since the death of James Henry Ambrose Griffiths it is unoccupied. As of 2010, there was only one Catholic church, the Holy Family Church with around 130 parishioners, which is under the Latin Patriarchate of Jerusalem.

== List of bishops ==
=== Resident bishops ===
- Philemon (1st century)
- Silvanus of Gaza (died c. 310 or 311)
- Asclepias (also Asclepas) of Gaza (fl. 325–343)
- Irenaeus (fl. c. 363)
- Porphyrius (c. 347–420)
- Netoras (fl. 431–451)
- Cyril (fl. c. 518)
- Marcianus (fl. 528–536)
- Misael (fl. c. 576–578)
- Sulayman al-Ghazzi (died c. 1027)

=== Titular bishops ===
Since the restoration of the diocese as a Catholic Titular Episcopal See around 1895, the following priests served as bishops:

- Henricus (Hendrik) van de Wetering 1850–1929), in office 8 February 1895 – 11 July 1895, until his installation as archbishop of Utrecht and Primate of the Netherlands
- Paolo Schinosi, appointed 19 April 1897, died in office 8 April 1901 †
- Alfonso Archi, in office 13 July 1901 – 10 October 1902 †
- Costanzo Castrale, appointed 27 March 1905; died 26 November 1936 †
- Giovanni Battista Tirinnanzi , O.F.M. Cap., 2 July 1937 – 27 January 1949 †
- James Henry Ambrose Griffiths, appointed 15 October 1949; died in office 24 February 1964 †
- Sede vacante since 24 February 1964

== See also ==
- Gazan Christians
- Catholic Church in Israel
- Catholic Church in Palestine
- History of the Jews in Gaza
