= John of Gaza =

Christian grammarian and poet

The 10th-century marginal note that calls John a grammarian: Ιωάννου γραμματεκού γάζης έκφρασης της εικόνος της κοσμογραφίας της εν τω χειμερία λουτρώ το δημοσίων έν γάζει ("John the grammarian of Gaza's ekphrasis on the image of the cosmography in the public winter baths at Gaza")

John of Gaza (fl. early 6th century) was a Christian grammarian and poet who wrote in Greek. John was part of the rhetorical school of Gaza.

== Life ==
John was a native of Gaza. In a marginal note in the Palatine Anthology, he is said to be a grammatikos, a teacher of grammar and poetry. His dates are not known precisely. He wrote after the middle of the 5th century, since he was heavily influenced by Nonnus's Dionysiaca. Different identifications of the subject of his ekphrasis yield different dates for his activity. If the baths were those at Antioch mentioned by Procopius of Gaza, he was seemingly writing before the Antioch earthquake of 526. If, on the other hand, they were the baths in Gaza mentioned by Choricius of Gaza, he must have been writing after 535–536. It is possible that he wrote as late as the 7th century.

== Works ==
Seven poems by John have survived: an ekphrasis and six Anacreontic verses. The ekphrasis, Tabula Mundi (Table of the World), contains 703 hexameters and an iambic prologue in epic language in the style of Nonnus of Panopolis. It survives only in the Paris fragment of the single manuscript of the Palatine Anthology, in which it is given the title Description of a Picture of the World Situated in the Winter Baths. (Note: Greek Ἰωάννου γραμματικοῦ Γάζης ἔκφρασις κοσμικοῦ πίνακος τοῦ ὄντος ἐν τῷ χειμερινῷ λουτρῷ.) This is not the original title of the work, which is better known as the Tabula Mundi, (Note: Latin for "painting or map (cf. tabula) of the world".) a purely conventional title.

The Tabula describes a cosmological mural in the winter baths at either Gaza or Antioch. The mural contained a Christian cross and 60 allegorical figures, including pagan deities. It has recently been suggested that the Tabula is a cosmological reflection in the form of an ekphrasis and does not in fact describe an actual mural. The poem is notable for John's treatment of personifications, as in this description of Gaia giving birth to the Karpoi:

But Gaia, showing her fertile nature, which makes the grain to grow, caused to shoot up from her womb her fruitful offspring; and leaning her back and spine on the ground, she raised her body on her couch with both hands, stretching her life-giving womb; she brought forth from her travail the twin Karpoi, a sweet offspring, having one male nurse, a long-winged angel, who, holding with his hands the knees of Gaia as she gave birth, and supporting from each side her opened thighs, spread them, and, with the midwife's craft, assisted her in the birth with the skill of his art, destroying the grievous pangs of hunger with countless stings.

John's poems in Anacreontic metre were written for competitions and special occasions. One on roses was written for the Rosalia, a major festival in Gaza. He also wrote on mythology and terms of address, and even composed Anacreontic epithalamia (bride songs) for local notables. Both his ekphrasis and Anacreontics were written for public performance. John was one of the last Greek poets to write in Anacreontic metre.

== Bibliography ==
- Aleksandrova, Tatiana (2020). "The Syncretic Revelation of John of Gaza". Scrinium. 16 (1): 147–157. doi:10.1163/18177565-00160A19.
- Baldwin, Barry (1991). "John of Gaza". In Kazhdan, Alexander (ed.). The Oxford Dictionary of Byzantium. Vol. 2. Oxford and New York: Oxford University Press. p. 1065. ISBN 0-19-504652-8.
- Cameron, Alan (1993). "On the Date of John of Gaza". The Classical Quarterly. 43 (1): 348–351. JSTOR 639482.
- Downey, Glanville (1938). "John of Gaza and the Mosaic of Ge and Karpoi". In R. Stielwell (ed.). Antioch-on-the-Orontes II: The Excavations 1933–1936. Princeton University Press. pp. 205–212.
- Hanfmann, George M. A. (1939). "The Seasons in John of Gaza's Tabula Mundi". Latomus. 3 (2): 111–118. JSTOR 41515507.
- Webb, Ruth (2018). "John of Gaza". In Nicholson, Oliver (ed.). The Oxford Dictionary of Late Antiquity, Volume 2: J–Z. Oxford: Oxford University Press. p. 830. ISBN 978-0-19-881625-6.
