= Agapius (died 306) =

- Died: 306 AD; Caesarea
- Cause of death: Murdered
- Venerated in: Catholic Church, Serbian Orthodox Church
- Feast: 20 November, 19 August

Agapius (Ancient Greek: Ἀγάπιος) was a Christian martyr killed at Caesarea in AD 306. He is recognized as a saint by the Catholic Church. His martyrdom is recorded by Eusebius of Caesarea in his work The Martyrs of Palestine.

== History ==
Agapius succeeded Theotecnus as bishop of Caesarea Maritima. He was arrested in AD 304. He remained in prison for two years and was tortured on multiple occasions. He was brought out to the arena many times and presented to the judges. There he was threatened and reserved for later matches. The judges, Eusebius notes, must have been motivated either out of compassion or the hope that he might change his mind and renounce Christianity.

Finally he was brought to the arena and presented to the emperor Maximinus. He was offered a pardon on the condition that he disavow his faith. According to Eusebius, he not only refused the offer, but he is said to have cheerfully rushed headlong into the bear. The animal inflicted severe injuries, but Agapius survived. Stones were affixed to his feet and he was drowned in the Mediterranean on the following day.

His feast days are observed on November 20 and August 19.

== Sources ==
- Agapius: Patron Saints Index
- November 20: St. Patrick Catholic Church, Saint of the Day
