= Alphaeus and Zacchaeus =

Saints Alphaeus and Zacchaeus
- Martyrs
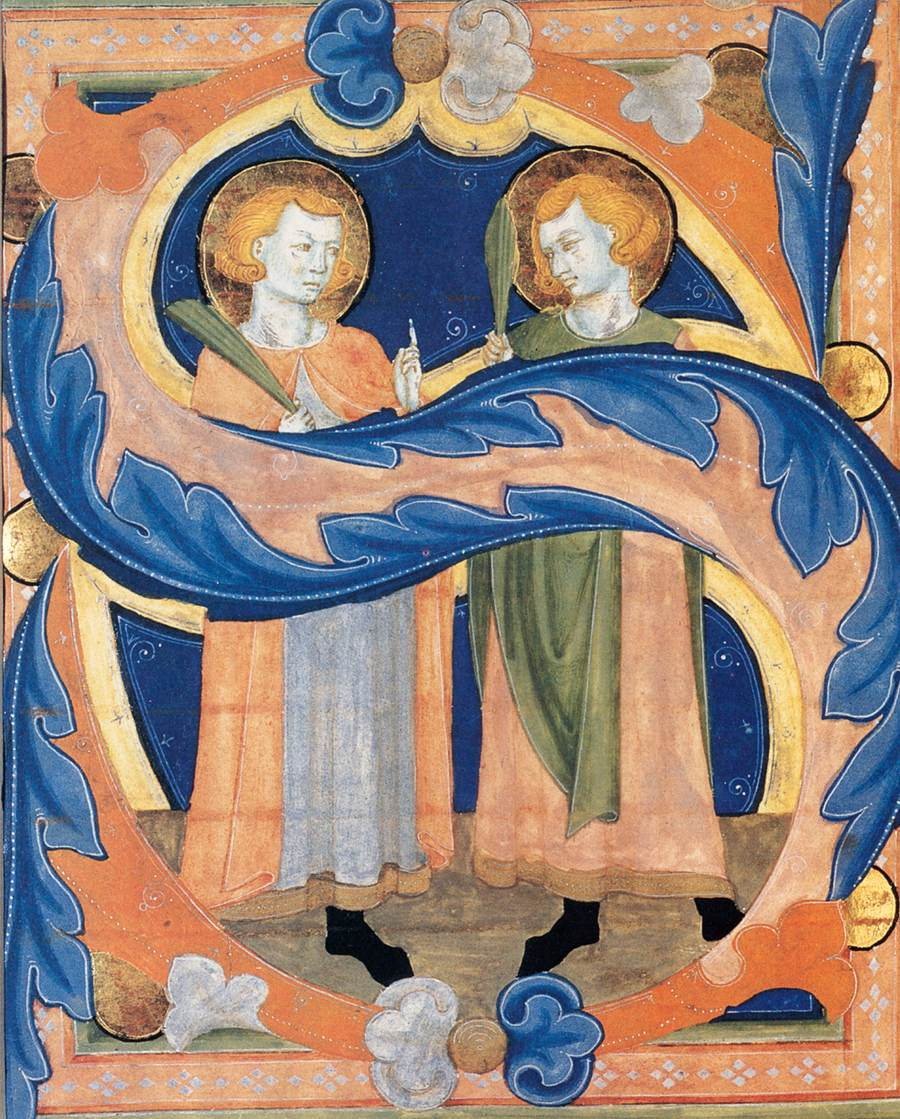
- 14th century painter - Two Martyr Saints in an Initial S

Personal details
- Died: 303 or 304 AD Caesarea

Saints Alphaeus and Zaccheus were two Christians who were put to death in Caesarea, Palestine, in 303 or 304, according to church historian Eusebius in his Martyrs of Palestine. They are commemorated on November 18.

== Background ==
There are two extant versions of Eusebius' Martyrs of Palestine and in both the shorter and the longer versions the stories of Alphaeus and Zaccheus are recounted, though with variations. Eusebius was present in Caesarea during the persecutions, part of the empire-wide campaign to suppress Christianity.

== Persecution of Christians in Caesarea ==
The Emperor Diocletian had ordered that all in the Empire should perform worship and sacrifices to the Roman gods. The authorities in Caesarea were so keen that all should obey this order that, according to the shorter recension of Eusebius' Martyrs of Palestine, they seized one Christian leader by the hands, led him to the altar and thrust the offering into his right hand. He was then dismissed as if he had performed the sacrifice. It was agreed by those in charge that they would attest that two others had made the offerings, even though they had not. Another Christian opened his mouth to say that he refused to worship the Roman gods when the guards struck him across the face, prevented him from speaking, and dismissed him, so that, says Eusebius, of the many brought in from the area to perform acts of worship to the Roman gods or die, only two, Alphaeus and Zaccheus, "were honored with the crown of the holy martyrs."

== Zaccheus ==
The authorities in Caesarea had brought in Christians from the surrounding area to apostasize or face death. Among them was a deacon from Gadara, Zaccheus, so-called after the person in the New Testament, according to Eusebius in the long recension of Martyrs of Palestine, owing to his short stature and sweet nature. He spoke boldly of his faith before the judges, was tortured and put into a prison cell.

== Alphaeus ==
Cousin of Zaccheus, Alphaeus was the lector of the church in Caesarea. His family was of high status in his native Eleutheropolis (Bayt Jibrin). Many Christians in the city and its surroundings, faced with the choice of their religious principles or death, were crowding into the city to perform sacrifices to the gods, when Alphaeus loudly and publicly denounced their apostasy. Whereupon he was brought before the judges, ordered to sacrifice, but refused, making defiant statements of his faith.

== Martyrdoms ==
Alphaeus and Zaccheus were tortured together over a period of days, and repeatedly offered the opportunity to sacrifice to the gods and be freed, but they refused despite their sufferings. They were finally both decapitated on the same day.
