= Aeneas of Gaza =

5th and 6th-century Neo-Platonic and Christian philosopher

- Died: c. 518; Gaza, Palaestina Prima, Byzantine Empire

Philosophical work
- Era: Ancient philosophy
- Region: Ancient Greek philosophy
- School: Neo-Platonism
- Institutions: Rhetorical School of Gaza
- Notable students: Procopius of Gaza
- Language: Ancient Greek
- Main interests: Theology

Aeneas of Gaza (Ancient Greek: Αἰνείας ὁ Γαζαῖος; d. c. 518) was a Neo-Platonic philosopher and a convert to Christianity who flourished towards the end of the fifth century. He is considered part of the Rhetorical School of Gaza, which flourished in Byzantine Palaestina in the fifth and sixth centuries.

== Life ==
Not much is known about his life. Aeneas was probably born around 450 in Gaza. In his major work entitled Theophrastus, he alludes to Hierocles of Alexandria as his teacher, and in some of his letters he mentions as his contemporaries writers from the end of the fifth century and the beginning of the sixth, such as Procopius of Gaza. Aeneas has been also suggested as the unnamed uncle of Marcianus of Gaza who is described as the bishop of Gaza prior to Marcianus and as a famous sophist.

Like many others from his literary circle, Aeneas had close relations with the monastic communities that surrounded Gaza. Aeneas for instance frequently consulted Abba Isaiah, a nearby famous ascetic and monastic monk, in regard to the writings of the philosophical writings of Plato, Aristotle and Plotinus.

== Thought ==
Like all the Christian Neo-Platonists, Aeneas held Plato in higher esteem than Aristotle. Like Synesius, Nemesius, and others, he found in Neo-Platonism the philosophical system which best accorded with Christian revelation. But, unlike Synesius and Nemesius, he rejected some of the most characteristic doctrines of the Neo-Platonists as being inconsistent with Christian dogma. For instance, he rejected the doctrine of pre-existence (according to which the soul of man existed before its union with body), arguing that the soul before its union with the body would have been "idle", incapable of exercising any of its faculties. Similarly, he rejected the doctrine of the eternal duration of the world, on the ground that the world is corporeal, and, although the best possible "mechanism", contains in itself the elements of dissolution Again, he taught that "man's body is composed of matter and form", and that while the matter perishes the "form" of the body retains the power of resuscitating the "matter" on the last day.

Twenty-five letters of Aeneas of Gaza survived to today and form one of late antiquity’s smallest and most idiosyncratic epistolary collections. The collection was likely much larger and survived as a microcollection whose fragments were likely coincidentally preserved by an eighth- or ninth-century anthologist.

== See also ==
- The Gaza Triad
- Neoplatonism and Christianity
- The Rhetorical School of Gaza

== Sources ==
- Aeneas of Gaza - Letters - Greek text and English translation at Roman Letters site.
- Aeneas of Gaza, Theophrastus, transl. by John Dillon and Donald Russell. With Zacharias of Mytilene, Ammonius, transl. by Sebastian Gertz, coll. Ancient commentators on Aristotle, London, Bristol Classical Press, 2012.
- Michael W. Champion, Explaining the cosmos : creation and cultural interaction in late-antique Gaza, coll. Oxford studies in late antiquity, Oxford, Oxford University Press, 2014.
- Manfred Wacht, Aeneas von Gaza als Apologet : seine Kosmologie im Verhältnis zum Platonismus, coll. Theophaneia, Bonn, Hanstein, 1969.
- Storin, Bradley K.; Sogno, Cristiana; Watts, Edward J. (November 2019). Late Antique Letter Collections A Critical Introduction and Reference Guide. University of California Press. ISBN 9780520308411.
