= Sulayman al-Ghazzi =

11th century Christian Arabian bishop and poet

- Bishop of Gaza
- Church: Greek Orthodox Church
- Diocese: Diocese of Gaza
- See: Gaza City

Personal details
- Born: ca. 940
- Died: ca. 1027

Sulayman Ibn Hassan al-Ghazzi (also Solomon of Gaza or Samunas, c. 940 – 1027) was an Arab Christian poet and bishop of Gaza in Fatimid Palestine. His work provides insights into the life of Orthodox Christians in the Holy Land during the persecutions of caliph al-Hakim and his diwan is the earliest known collection of Arabic poetry dealing specifically with Christian religious themes.

== Life ==
Though there are no outside sources about Sulayman's life, his life has been reconstructed from his highly personal verses by Néophytos Edelby. It seems that Sulayman entered a monastery as a youth after his father (called Hasan, Basila or possibly both) abandoned by his mother. However, shortly after taking his vows he left the monastery to lead a secular life (possibly working as a Katib), got wealthy and married. In his old age he lost not only his wife, but also his son and then only grandson (named Ibrahim) as well as his wealth. Sulayman finally returned to the monastic life and was eventually ordained bishop around the age of eighty, not least due to his great learning which becomes evident from his writing. He died some time after 1027.

== Work ==
Though there have been other important Christian Arab poets such as the pre-Islamic al-Nabigah al-Dubyani or the court poet al-Akthal al-Taghlibi, Sulayman al-Ghazzi is the first to compose poetry on specific Christian themes and speaking about his Christian faith. His writings provide insights into the lives of Christian Arabs during the Fatimid Caliphate and protest the persecutions under caliph al-Hakim as well as the discrimination endured by the Christian population and the destruction of Christian sites such as the Holy Sepulchre in Jerusalem or the church of Saint George in Lydda. Sulayman also mentions the Palestinian monasteries he visited and wrote apologetic treatise of a Chalcedonian creed against various heresis.

Nevertheless, Sulayman's most important literary achievement is his Diwan. It consists of 97 qasidas amounting to over 3,000 lines encompassing various religious topics, dating to the last third of the 10th century to the first third of the 11th century. The poems deal with various topics the sins of his youth and personal tragedies, the defence of orthodoxy, the persecution and humiliation endured by the Christians during his time. The dominant themes are the interconnectedness of his personal tragedy, his Palestinian environment and his highly developed theology of Incarnation. Central are two Christological ideas: first, that Christ is God, present as well in the New as the Old Testament and second, that Christ is fully united to humankind. This unity is achieved in that when Christ died, mankind died, and when he ascended into Heaven, he brought mankind with him.

The oldest manuscript that records his work dates to the year 1116. The poems of Sulayman were frequently sung or set to music.
