= Israel Ze'evi =

Israeli rabbi (1650–1731)

Abraham Israel Ze'evi
- אברהם ישראל זאבי

Personal life
- Born: 1650 Hebron, Ottoman Palestine
- Died: 1731 (aged 80–81) Hebron, Ottoman Palestine
- Spouse: Daughter of Abraham Cuenqui
- Occupation: Rabbi, Talmudist
- Relatives: Israel ben Azariah Ze'evi (great-grandfather); Abraham Azulai (grandfather); Isaac Azulai (uncle)

Religious life
- Religion: Judaism

Abraham Israel Ze'evi (Hebrew: אברהם ישראל זאבי; 1650–1731) was a rabbi and Talmudist of Hebron.

== Life ==
Israel Ze'evi was born in Hebron in 1651. He was a great-grandson of the Jerusalemite rabbi Israel ben Azariah Ze'evi, and grandson of the Moroccan kabbalist Abraham Azulai. His father died when he was but four years old, and he was educated by his mother and uncle, Isaac Azulai. At the age of eighteen he married a daughter of Abraham Cuenqui. His cousin, Abraham ben David Yitzhaki, the Chief Rabbi of Palestine, would later marry his daughter.

From 1701 to 1731, Ze'evi was chief rabbi of Hebron where he headed the "Emeth le-Ya'akov" yeshivah which had been founded by Abraham Pereira of Amsterdam. It was the oldest such college still functioning in Hebron at the turn of the 20th century. He also acted as an emissary of Hebron, visiting Constantinople in 1685, where he met Tzvi Ashkenazi.

== Works ==
- Orim Gedolim ('The Great Lights'; Smyrna, 1758), a treatise on rabbinical law which included Talmudic novellae, sermons and responsa.
- Or li-Yesharim, a collection of homilies.
