= Timotheus of Gaza =

6th century Greek author of a book on animals

Timotheus of Gaza (Greek: Τιμόθεος ὁ Γαζαῖος), sometimes referred to as Timothy of Gaza, was a Palestinian Christian grammarian active during the reign of Anastasius, i.e. 491–518. His works became very popular within the Byzantine Greek and Arabic scientific literature.

== Life and work ==
Timotheus was likely linked to the rhetorical school of Gaza, an academy that combined classical Hellenistic tradition with Christian thought. He also went to study in Alexandria in Egypt with Horapollo the grammarian from the village Phenebythis. He was the author of a book on animals which may have been one of the sources of the Arabic Nu'ut al-Hayawan. He also wrote a work in four volumes titled Indian Animals or Quadrupeds and Their Innately Wonderful Qualities or Stories about Animals that survives only in an 11th-century prose summary. This prose summary was a very popular school text, and includes accounts of the giraffe, tiger, and other animals.

Timotheus might have also composed a tragedy lampooning the chrysargyron tax.
