= Timolaus and companions =

Saint Timolaus and companions
- Martyrs
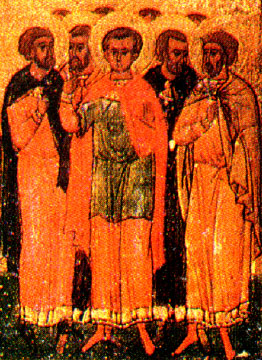
- Icon of Saint Timolaus and Companions

Personal details
- Died: 303 AD Caesarea

Saint Timolaus and five companions, according to the historian of the early Christian church Eusebius in his Martyrs of Palestine, were young men who, having heard that the Roman authorities in Caesarea, Palestine, in 303 AD, had condemned a number of Christians to die by being thrown to wild beasts in the public arena, came before the governor of their own volition with their hands tied behind their backs and demanded to join their fellow Christians in that martyrdom. They were not however thrown to wild beasts but decapitated along with two other men who were already in prison.

== Background ==
There are two extant versions of Eusebius' Martyrs of Palestine but in only the shorter recension is the story of Timolaus and his companions recounted; in the longer recension Timolaus is not mentioned. Eusebius was present in Caesarea during the persecutions, part of the empire-wide campaign to suppress Christianity.

== Persecution of Christians in Caesarea ==
The Emperor Diocletian had ordered that all in the Empire should perform worship and sacrifices to the Roman gods. Those who refused to do so in Caesarea, according to Eusebius, were interrogated and tortured if necessary to try to force them to apostasize, and if nothing would convince them to perform the sacrifices, they were executed.

== Timolaus ==
The governor of Caesarea, Urban, had already had two Christians thrown to wild beasts in the public arena for refusing to perform the sacrifices to the Roman gods. As part of an upcoming festival, among the spectacles planned were more executions of this kind. Hearing of this, a young man, Timolaus from Pontus (on the Black Sea, in modern-day Turkey), along with five others, "went in haste" to the governor, having tied their own hands behind their backs, declared themselves Christians, and demanded also to be thrown to the beasts. The "astonished" governor, however, had them imprisoned for two days and then decapitated along with two others.

== Companions ==
According to Eusebius, Timolaus' companions in seeking martyrdom in this way were "Dionysius from Tripolis in Phoenicia, Romulus, a sub-deacon of the parish of Diospolis, Paesis and Alexander, both Egyptians, and another Alexander from Gaza." They were joined by another man who was already in prison, having previously been tortured, Agapius, and another Dionysius, who had supplied him with food while he was in prison. All eight were beheaded on the same day.
