= Agapius of Palestine =

Agapius of Palestine (Greek: Άγιος Ἀγάπιος, from the Greek αγάπη, love) was a Christian martyr from Gaza, beheaded along with seven others by order of Urban, governor of Palestine, in the year 303 or 304 under the Great Persecution of Diocletian. Eusebius records that Timolaus of Pontus, Dionysius from Tripolis in Phœnicia, Romulus, said to have been sub-deacon of the parish of Diospolis, Plæsius of Egypt, and two men named Alexander, one from Gaza and the other from Gazahad. These six young men bound themselves and surrendered to Urban in the hopes of becoming martyrs. They openly professed their Christianity and said that their faith made them unafraid of the wild animals of the arena. Urban had them put into prison. A few days later they were joined by two others, one a certain Dionysius, and the other Agapius, who is said to have been tortured in the past for his faith. All eight were beheaded in Caesarea Maritima on the same day.

His feast day is observed on March 24. The Orthodox Church observes his memory on March 15th (Gregorian calendar) and on March 28th (Julian calendar).
