= Choricius of Gaza =

Greek sophist and rhetorician of Late Antiquity

Choricius of Gaza (Greek: Χορίκιος) was a Gaza-based Greek sophist and rhetorician of Late Antiquity. With writings dating to the early sixth century, he flourished in the time of Anastasius I (AD 491–518) as a scholar and public orator. He is considered as part of the Rhetorical School of Gaza, of which he later became the chair.

Choricius was the pupil of Procopius of Gaza, who must be distinguished from the historian Procopius of Caesarea. He was a Christian and among the surviving works of Choricius are many public addresses, such as to dedication of church of St. Sergius and a basilica dedicated to St. Stephen. Nevertheless, like other members of the School of Gaza, he displayed his traditional education through his profound knowledge of classic Hellenic mythology, literature and history. As given in his second address on bishop Marcian of Gaza, given around 520, he emphasised the bond between classic erudition and ecclesiastic scriptural exegesis, the "one offering eloquence, the other one benefitting the soul".

These works also give a good insight into late-Roman Gaza, such as about its traditions and festivals as well as about the numerous building projects initiated by its impactful bishops Marcianus and the governor Stephanus.

== Style and works ==
A number of Choricius' declamations and descriptive treatises have been preserved. The declamations, which are in many cases accompanied by explanatory commentaries, chiefly consist of panegyrics, funeral orations and the stock themes of the rhetorical schools. By contrast his wedding speeches, wishing prosperity to the bride and bridegroom, are a rhetorical innovation.

Choricius was also the author of descriptions of works of art after the manner of Philostratus. The moral maxims, which were a constant feature of his writings, were largely drawn upon by Macarius Chrysocephalus, metropolitan of Philadelphia (middle of the 14th century), in his Rodonia (rose-garden), a voluminous collection of ethical sayings.

The style of Choricius is praised by Photius as pure and elegant, but he is censured for lack of naturalness. A special feature of his style is the persistent avoidance of hiatus, peculiar to what is called the school of Gaza.
