= Zacharias Rhetor =

5th–6th century Bishop of Mytilene

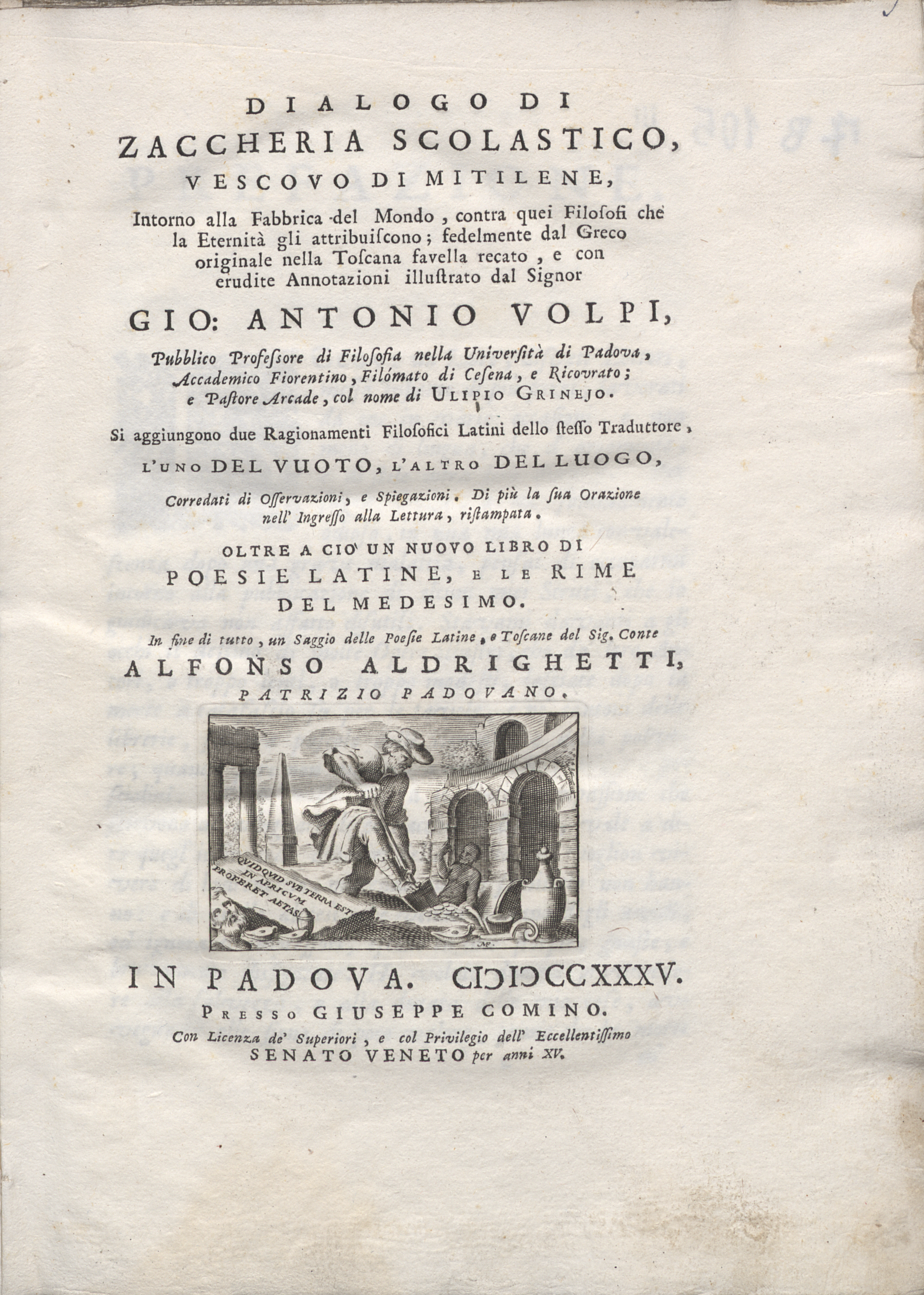
Ammonius

Zacharias of Mytilene (Ζαχαρίας ό Μυτιληναίος; c. 465, Gaza – after 536), also known as Zacharias Scholasticus or Zacharias Rhetor, was a bishop and ecclesiastical historian.

== Life ==
The life of Zacharias of Mytilene can be reconstructed only from a few scattered reports in contemporary sources (the accounts are also partly conflicting – for example, some Syrian authors have "Melitene" instead of "Mytilene"). Zacharias was born and raised in a Christian family near Gaza, which hosted a significant school of rhetorics in late antiquity. That was also where he received his initial education. In 485, he travelled to Alexandria, where he studied philosophy for two years. In Alexandria, he was embroiled in a conflict between Christians and pagans in connection with the Horapollo affair. It was also there he met Severus, who was later to become a notable patriarch of Antioch.

In 487, Zacharias travelled to Beirut to study law at its law school. He stayed there, leading an ascetic life, until 491, but he also made several journeys to different parts of Palestine in search of religious knowledge. He finally moved to Constantinople, where he worked as a lawyer for a long time. Zacharias, who was Miaphysite in Christology, yet did not ardently oppose Chalcedonians, seems to have often contemplated becoming a monk. He apparently had good contacts with the imperial court and that probably won him the appointment as Bishop of Mytilene on Lesbos. His successor is known to have taken the post in 553, setting the terminus ante quem for his death. He was certainly alive in 536, as he took part in the Synod in Constantinople that year.

== Works ==
Zacharias composed several works in Greek, among which is an ecclesiastical history that was probably completed towards the end of the 5th century. The document, dedicated to Eupraxius, a dignitary, contains valuable historical material and describes the time period from 451 to 491. It was used by Evagrius Scholasticus for his own history. Zacharias also composed three biographies of Monophysitic clergymen who he had met personally: the above-mentioned Severus, Peter the Iberian and the Egyptian monk Isaiah the Younger. The biographies have been preserved with varying quality. Zacharias also wrote several polemic works, e.g. against the philosopher Ammonius Hermiae and against the Manichaeans.

=== Pseudo-Zacharias Rhetor ===
While all original versions of Zacharias's ecclesiastical histories were later lost, a truncated and revised Syriac version was preserved, by an author believed to have been a Monophysite monk from Amida. This anonymous author, who has been commonly known as Pseudo-Zacharias Rhetor, incorporated it in Historia Miscellanea, a 12-book compilation of ecclesiastical histories. Pseudo-Zacharias's edition of Zacharias's ecclesiastical history, constituting books 3–6, is also usually known as Pseudo-Zacharias Rhetor.

The first English translation of Pseudo-Zacharias Rhetor was not published until in 1899 under the title The Syriac Chronicle by F. J. Hamilton and E. W. Brooks. It was part of a five-volume series, Byzantine Texts, edited by J. B. Bury. A new English translation was published by Liverpool University Press in 2011 under the title The Chronicle of Pseudo-Zachariah Rhetor: Church and War in Late Antiquity. Edited by Geoffrey Greatrex and translated into English by Robert R. Phenix and Cornelia B. Horn, it consists of a translation of books 3-12 of Historia Miscellanea; a second volume is planned for the translation of books 1–2.

== Literature ==
=== Editions and translations ===
- Ammonius (in Latin). Padova: Giuseppe Comino. 1735.
- Zacharias of Mytilene, Ammonius. Transl. by S. Gertz. London 2012.
- The Chronicle of Pseudo-Zachariah Rhetor: Church and War in Late Antiquity. Ed. by G. Greatrex. Translated by Robert R. Phenix and Cornelia B. Horn, with Contributions by Sebastian P. Brock and Witold Witakowski. Liverpool 2011.
- Historia ecclesiastica Zachariae Rhetori vulgo adscripta. Ed. by E.W. Brooks. Louvain 1919-1924 [with Latin translation].
- Die sogennante Kirchengeschichte des Zacharias Rhetor. Transl. by K. Ahrens & G. Krüger. Leipzig 1899.
- The Syriac Chronicle known as that of Zachariah of Mitylene. Transl. by F. J. Hamilton & E. W. Brooks. London 1899.

=== Secondary sources ===
- P. Allen: Zachariah Scholasticus and the Historia Ecclesiastica of Evagrius. In: JTS 31 (1980), p. 471–488.
