= Rhetorical school of Gaza =

Group of influential scholars in Gaza during the late antiquity

The rhetorical school of Gaza was a group of influential scholars based in Gaza in Late Antiquity (5th–6th centuries), many of whom exhibited a teacher-pupil relationship and participated as orators in local public life. Famous chairs of the school included Aeneas, Procopius, and Choricius.

== Description ==
Rhetoric played an important role throughout the ancient world, not only in poetry and the art of persuasion but also directly in the training of lawyers, orators, historians, scholars, politicians and judges. Although Libanus had already remarked that Gaza was a "workshop of eloquence", the peak of rhetorical practice began from the middle of the fifth century onwards with the group of intellectuals that formed the school of Gaza. The city also boasted an important library that could to a certain extent compete with Athens, Alexandria, Beirut and Constantinople, and in which the Byzantine historian Procopius of Caeserea wrote a scandalous biography of the empress Theodora. Just as Beirut became the center of elite legal studies, Gaza became a home for classics and premier "university town" for philosophy.

Scholarly and rhetorical output of the School at Gaza included traditional Hellenic forms common to the classically educated Christian elite of the era. As in other places, the initial period of alarm and uncertainty with which classical literature and Hellenistic learning had been looked upon had passed and scholars considered the classical education as valuable for the training of Christians. Thus, Choricius of Gaza stated in his panegyric of the bishop Marcian that it was important for a bishop to be trained both in Christian and pagan literature. Both Procopius and Aeneas of Gaza were influenced by Neoplatonism which they synthesized with early orthodox Christian ideas.

Among the important collections of writings to have survived are letters which were exchanged in Gaza and also with scholars in Alexandria during this time. Several members of the school of Gaza had attended schools in Alexandria themselves, among them Procopius, Aeneas, and Zacharias Rhetor and Gaza has been called at times "a cultural colony of Alexandria".

As was common in rhetorical schools, individual teachers would attract a circle of pupils. These teachers would present compositions to their students both to serve as models as well as for their feedback while students would present their speeches to the master for criticism. Apart from rhetoric, the other subjects taught at the school were law, grammar, logic and philosophy and possibly Latin which could have been useful for the further study of law in Beirut. It seems that the public funded the chairs of Procopius and Choricius.

== Interactions within Gazan society ==
The members of the school were also in close contact with the many monastic communities in the Gaza region. Thus Aeneas of Gaza consulted Abba Isaiah the Solitary on the philosophical writings of Plato, Aristotle and Plotinus, while the ascetic education of monastic figures such as Dorotheus of Gaza were influenced by the intellectual environment in Gaza stimulated by the members of the school. Eric Wheeler suggests that Procopius was the teacher of Dorotheus and that Procopius is the unnamed sophist mentioned in Dorotheus' Discourse 2.36.

Not much is known about the composition of the disciples of the school of Gaza, however it is likely that it included apart from Gazans also students from wider Palestine, Jews and Ghassanid Arabs.

== Impact ==
Historian Nur Masalha argues that the Rhetorical School at Gaza helped turn Byzantine Palaestina into "one of the most important centres of learning and intellectual activity in Late Antiquity", even eclipsing other major cities in the Mediterranean region, namely Athens and Alexandria. He writes that the "soft power" represented by the school and the contemporary Library of Caesarea-Palaestina afforded Palestine a degree of local autonomy in the Byzantine era.

== Members ==
- Aeneas of Gaza, Neo-platonic philosopher (c. 450–518)
- Choricius of Gaza, sophist and rhetorician (fl. 520)
- John of Gaza, grammarian and poet (fl. 525)
- Marcianus of Gaza, bishop of Gaza (fl. 536)
- Procopius of Gaza, sophist and rhetorician (465–528)
- Procopius of Caesarea (uncertain), scholar and historian (c. 500–565)
- Timotheus of Gaza (uncertain), grammarian (fl. 512)
- Zacharias Rhetor, bishop and ecclesiastic historian (died before 553)
