= Procopius of Gaza =

Byzantine sophist and rhetorician (c. 465–528)

Procopius of Gaza (Greek: Προκόπιος, romanized: Prokópios; c. 465 – c. 528) was a Christian sophist and rhetorician, one of the most important representatives of the Rhetorical School of Gaza.

== Life and work ==
The only sources for Procopius' life are his surviving letters, and the funeral oration composed and delivered by his pupil, Choricius. Procopius was born in Gaza, one of at least five children, roughly in 465–470. (Note: Derived from his estimated year of death.) He displayed an inclination for learning in childhood and, after the early death of his father, moved to Alexandria to attend its rhetorical school, possibly studying under Olympiodorus. He achieved recognition during his studies, and continued to correspond with Alexandrian acquaintances throughout his life. After periods of stay in Pamphylia and Caesarea, he opted to return and practice in Gaza, despite offers from the schools of Antioch, Tyre and Caesarea; he eventually succeeded Aeneas as the head of the school of Gaza. He devoted his time to his career and literary activity, and did not marry or have children. At an advanced age he retired to a private life, leaving most of his professional duties to Choricius. His death is approximately dated to 526–530; Choricius reports that he died at the age of 62.

Procopius was the author of numerous rhetorical and theological works. His surviving rhetorical output comprises a panegyric on the Roman Emperor Anastasius I Dicorus (his longest preserved work), two monodies, (Note: The monodies had been attributed to Choricius from their discovery in 1983 until 2011, when evidence confirming Procopian authorship surfaced. A third monody formerly ascribed to him (PG 87.3, coll. 2837–2842) is the work of Psellos.) an epithalamium, two ekphraseis, four dialexeis, and four ethopoeiae. Also preserved are 165 (Note: 163 letters were known until 2005, when E. Amato discovered a further two (as well as four letters addressed to Procopius).) letters, addressed to persons of rank, friends, and literary opponents, which shed light on the condition of the sophistical rhetoric of the period and about the academic circles in Alexandria and Gaza. A number of further works have been lost, including several orations, as well as a collection of paraphrases of select Homeric passages into various rhetorical styles.

Procopius' theological writings consist of commentaries on the Octateuch, the books of Kings and Chronicles, Isaiah, the Proverbs, the Song of Songs and Ecclesiastes. They are amongst the earliest examples of the "catenic" (catena, chain) form of commentary, consisting of a series of extracts from the fathers, arranged, with independent additions, to elucidate the portions of Scripture concerned. Photius (cod. 206), while blaming the diffuseness of these commentaries, praises the writer's learning and style, which, however, he considers too ornate for the purpose.

Scholars have questioned whether Procopius the rhetorician and Procopius the biblical commentator are to be identified as the same person, citing evidence which suggests the epitome of Genesis was composed after the rhetorician's death around 528.

== Works cited ==
- Amato, Eugenio (2005). "Sei epistole mutuae inedite di Procopio di Gaza ed il retore Megezio". Byzantinische Zeitschrift (in Italian). 98 (2). Leipzig: K. G. Saur: 367–383. doi:10.1515/BYZS.2005.367.
- Amato, Eugenio (2010). Rose di Gaza. Gli scritti retorico-sofistici e le Epistole di Procopio di Gaza (in Italian). Alessandria: Edizioni dell'Orso. ISBN 978-88-6274-233-7.
- Amato, Eugenio; Corcella, Aldo; Ventrella, Gianluca (2014). Procope de Gaza. Discours et fragments (in French). Paris: Les Belles Lettres. ISBN 978-2-251-00587-4.
- Corcella, Aldo (2011). "Tre nuovi testi di Procopio di Gaza: una dialexis inedita e due monodie già attribuite a Coricio". Revue des Études Tardo-antiques (in Italian). 1: 1–14. ISSN 2115-8266.
- Cribiore, Raffaella (2018). "education and schools, Greek". The Oxford Dictionary of Late Antiquity. Oxford: Oxford University Press. ISBN 978-0-19-866277-8.
- Johnson, Scott Fitzgerald (2016). Languages and Cultures of Eastern Christianity: Greek. Routledge. ISBN 978-1-351-92323-1.
- Kumaniecki, Kasimir (1929). "Eine unbekannte Monodie auf den Einsturz der Hagia Sophia im Jahre 558". Byzantinische Zeitschrift (in German). 30 (1). Leipzig-Berlin: B. G. Teubner: 35–43. doi:10.1515/bz-1929-0110.
- Kustas, George L. (1973). Studies in Byzantine Rhetoric. Thessalonica: Πατριαρχικὸν Ἵδρυμα Πατερικῶν Μελετῶν.
- Litsas, Fotios K. (1980). "History of the School of Gaza". Choricius of Gaza: An Approach to His Work. Introduction, Translation, Commentary (PhD thesis). Chicago: University of Chicago. pp. 2–19.
- Vikan, Gary; Kazhdan, Alexander; Ma῾oz, Zvi 'Uri (1991). "Gaza". The Oxford Dictionary of Byzantium. Oxford: Oxford University Press. ISBN 978-0-19-504652-6.
- Webb, Ruth (2018). "Gaza, schools and rhetoric at". The Oxford Dictionary of Late Antiquity. Oxford: Oxford University Press. ISBN 978-0-19-866277-8.
- Zaganas, Dimitrios (2024). "Procope compilateur d'exégèses et Procope sophiste de Gaza. Un seul et même auteur?". In Zaganas, Dimitrios; Auwers, Jean-Marie; Verheyden, Joseph (eds.). Procopius the Christian Sophist. Catenist, Compiler, Epitomist (in French). Turnhout: Brepols. pp. 17–48. doi:10.1484/M.IPM-EB.5.136513.
