= Shrine of Husayn's Head =

Former Fatimid-era Shi'a shrine in Palestine

Coordinates: 31.6605°N 34.5593°E

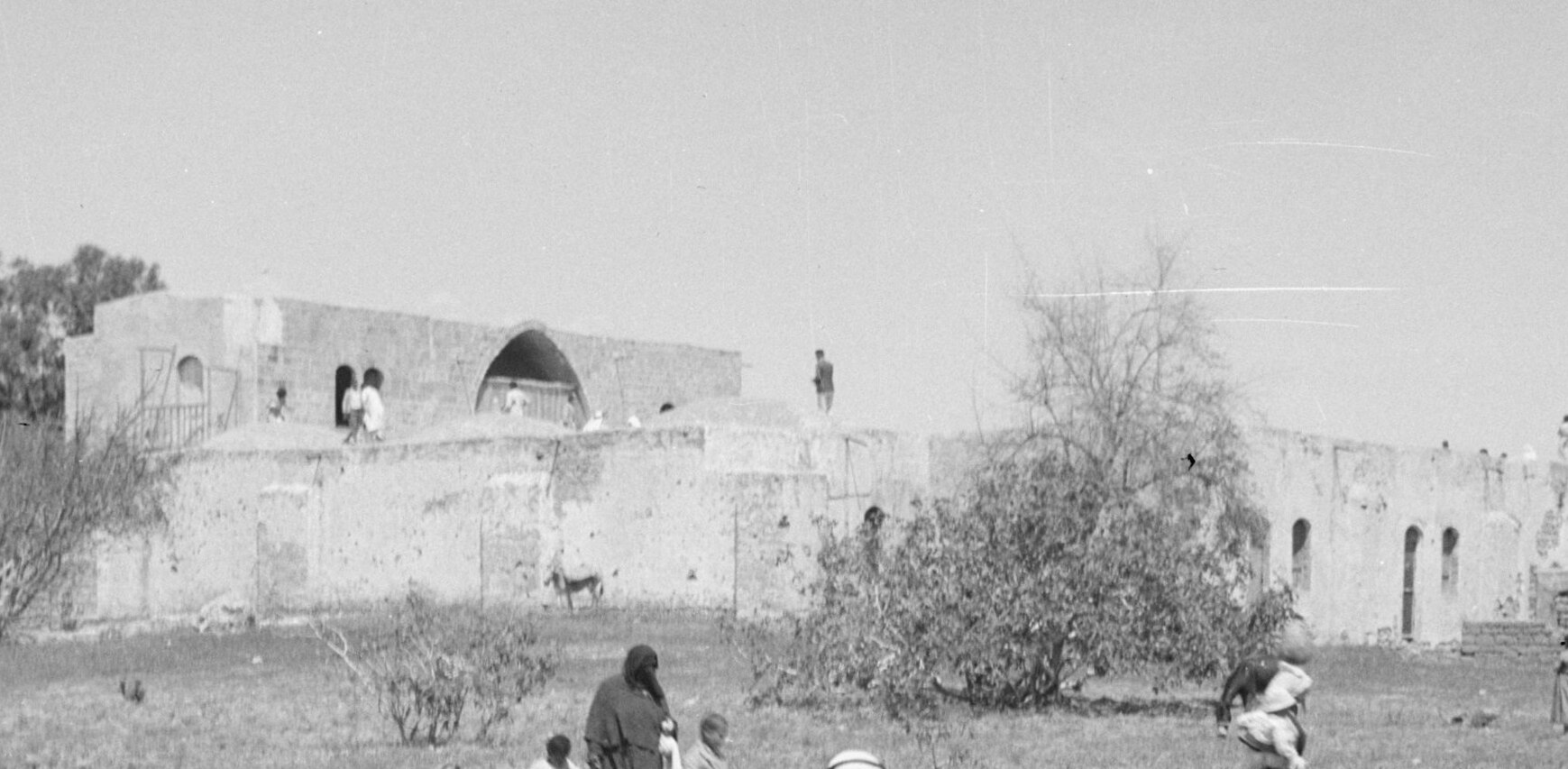
Shrine of Husayn's Head in 1943

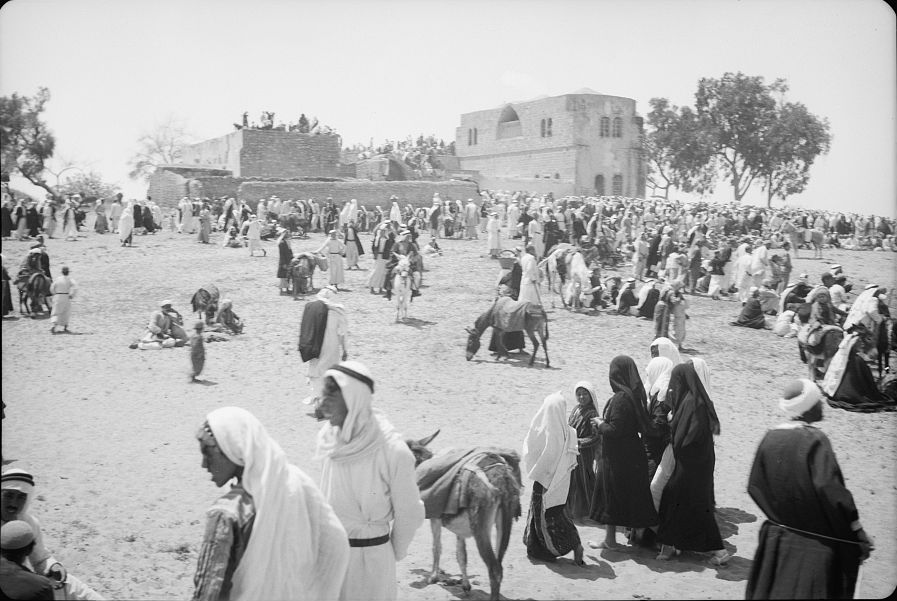
The shrine during the annual festival

The Shrine of Husayn's Head (Arabic: مشْهد ٱلحُسَين, romanized: Mašhad al-Ḥusayn, lit. 'Mausoleum of Husayn') was a shrine built by the Fatimids on a hilltop adjacent to Ascalon that was reputed to have held the head of Husayn ibn Ali between c. 906 CE and 1153 CE. It was described as the most magnificent building in the ancient city, and developed into the most important and holiest Shi'a site in Palestine.

In modern times, it became associated with the Palestinian town of Al-Jura, which sat alongside the ruined citadel of Ascalon. The shrine was destroyed in 1950 by the Israeli army, more than a year after hostilities ended, on the orders of Moshe Dayan. This was in accordance with a 1950s Israeli policy of erasing Muslim historical sites within Israel, and in line with efforts to expel the remaining Palestinian Arabs from the region.

== Description ==
=== Building ===
The shrine was a large multi-story structure built up on three sides around a central courtyard. A prayer room (musalla) was on the south side. The former place of Husayn's head was marked by a pillar capped with a green turban over a red cloth.

=== Minbar and inscriptions ===
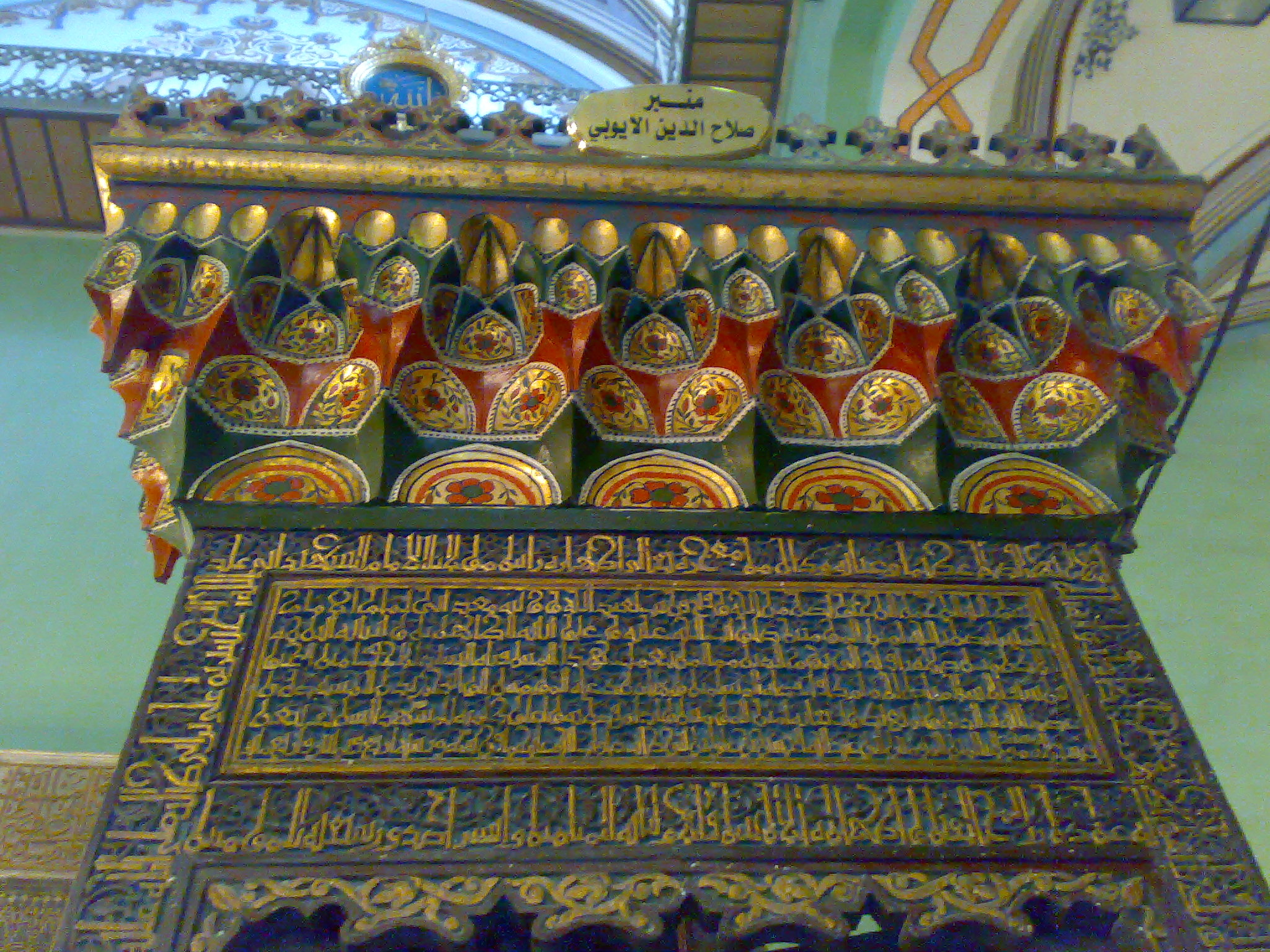
The minbar, today in the Ibrahimi Mosque, contains inscriptions describing the construction of the shrine

The minbar (an Islamic pulpit), today in the Ibrahimi Mosque in Hebron, is considered a significant piece of Islamic art and one of the most significant historic minbars in the medieval Muslim world. It is also the oldest surviving minbar in this style of woodwork with geometric decoration; a style also seen in the design of the later Minbar of the al-Aqsa Mosque in Jerusalem (which was also a gift from Salah ad-Din). The inscriptions record the construction of the minbar and of the shrine itself by Badr al-Jamali on behalf of the Fatimid caliph.

== History ==
=== Construction ===
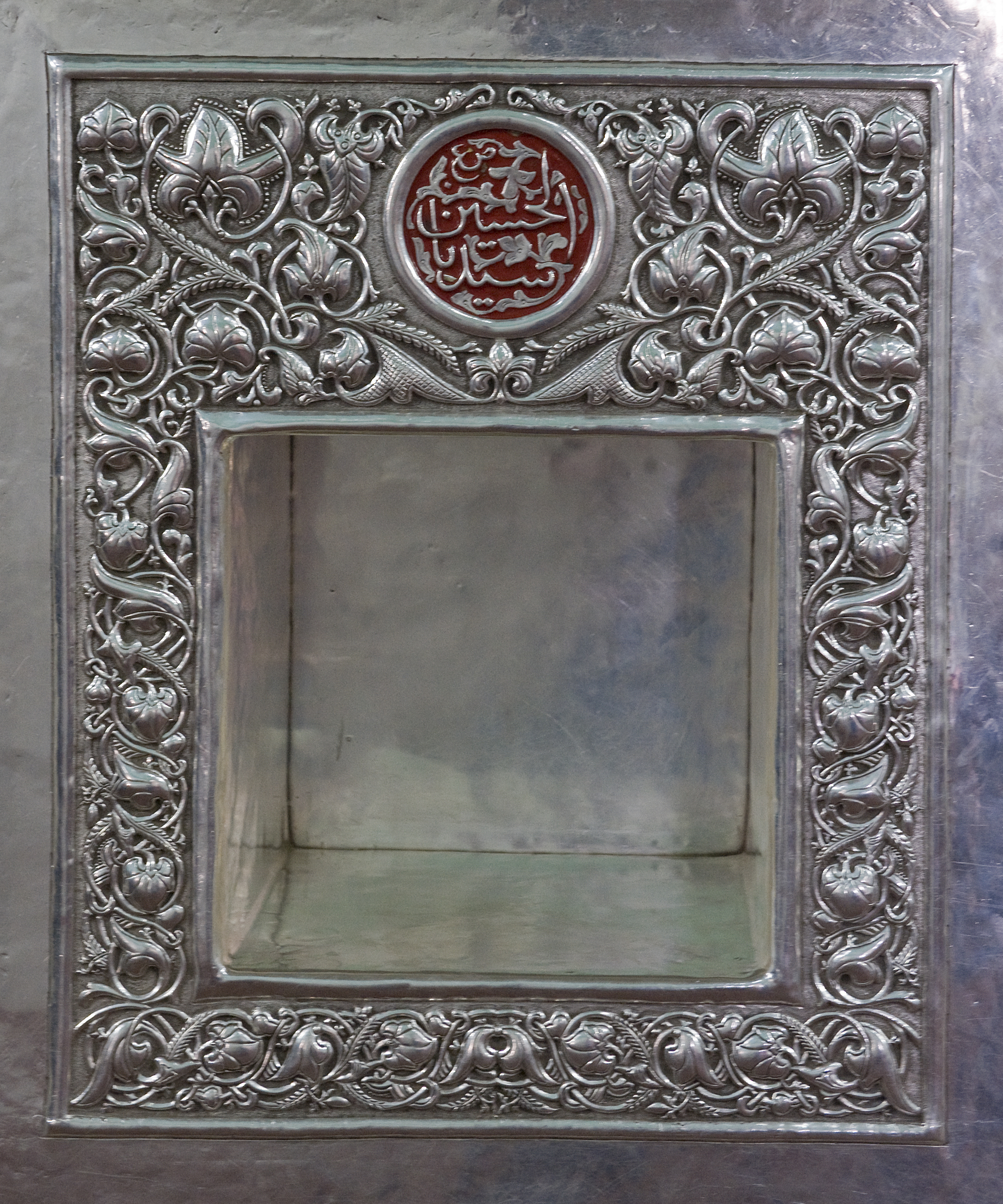
Niche for Husayn's head at the Umayyad mosque in Damascus

According to Fatimid tradition, the head of Husayn had been secretly moved by the Abbasids from its original burial site at the Great Mosque of Damascus. In the year 985, the 15th Fatimid Caliph, Abu Mansoor Nizar al-Aziz Billah, traced the site of his great-grandfather's head through the office of a contemporary in Baghdad.

It was "rediscovered" in 1091, a couple of years after a campaign by grand vizier Badr al-Jamali to reestablish Fatimid control over Palestine under Caliph al-Mustansir Billah.

Upon the discovery, he ordered the construction of a new Friday mosque and mashhad (memorial shrine) on the site. A magnificent minbar was also built, today in Hebron and known as the Minbar of the Ibrahimi Mosque.

The mausoleum was described by Mohammed al-Abdari al-Hihi as the most magnificent building in Ashkelon.

=== Transfer of the head to Cairo ===
Following the defeat at the Siege of Ascalon, the Majidi-monarch, Al-Zafir, ordered Ashkelon's ruler Sayf al-Mamlaka Tamim to transfer the head to Cairo.

Husayn's casket was unearthed and moved from the shrine to Cairo on Sunday 8 Jumada al-Thani, 548 (31 August 1153); the Al-Hussein Mosque was built to house the relic in 1154. Yemeni writer Syedi Hasan bin Asad described the transfer of the head thus in his Risalah manuscript: "When the Raas [head of] al Imam al Husain was taken out of the casket, in Ashkelon, drops of the fresh blood were visible on the Raas al Imam al Husain and the fragrance of Musk spread all over."

=== Transfer of the minbar to Hebron ===
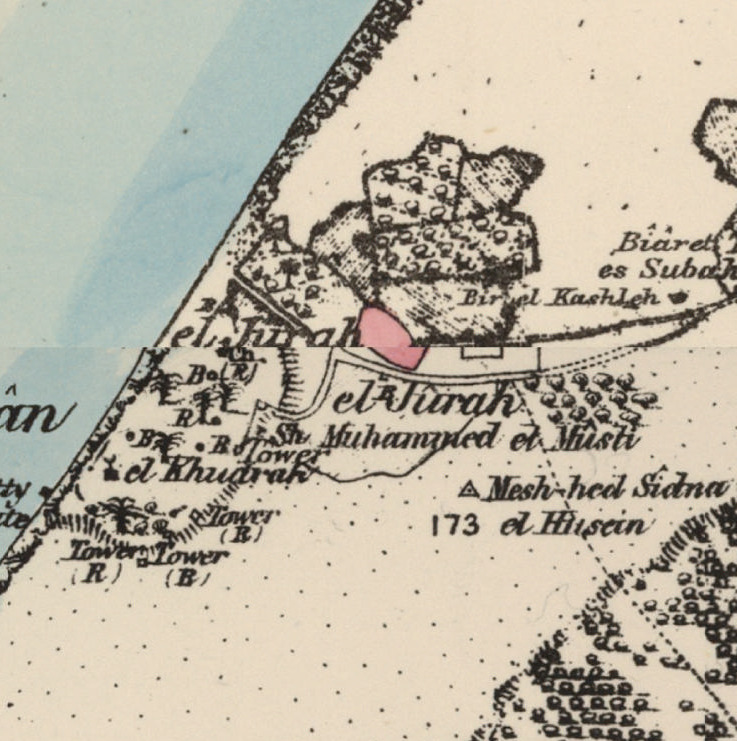
PEF Survey of Palestine map (1870s) showing al-Jura (middle), the ruins of ancient Ashkelon (today Tel Ashkelon, left), and the Mesh-hed Sidna el Husein (right)

In 1187 Salah ad-Din (Saladin) succeeded in recapturing Jerusalem from Crusaders and securing Muslim (Ayyubid) control over most of the region. However, he judged that Ashkelon was too vulnerable to a Crusader counterattack and he worried about its potential use as an enemy bridgehead against the newly recaptured Jerusalem. He therefore decided to demolish the city in 1191 but transferred the Fatimid minbar of al-Husayn's now-empty mashhad to the Ibrahimi Mosque in Hebron, which was also a holy site and was situated at a safer distance from the Crusader threat. The minbar has remained there until the present day.

=== British Mandate period ===
During the British Mandate period it was described as a "large maqam on top of a hill" with no tomb but a fragment of a pillar showing the place where the head had been buried.

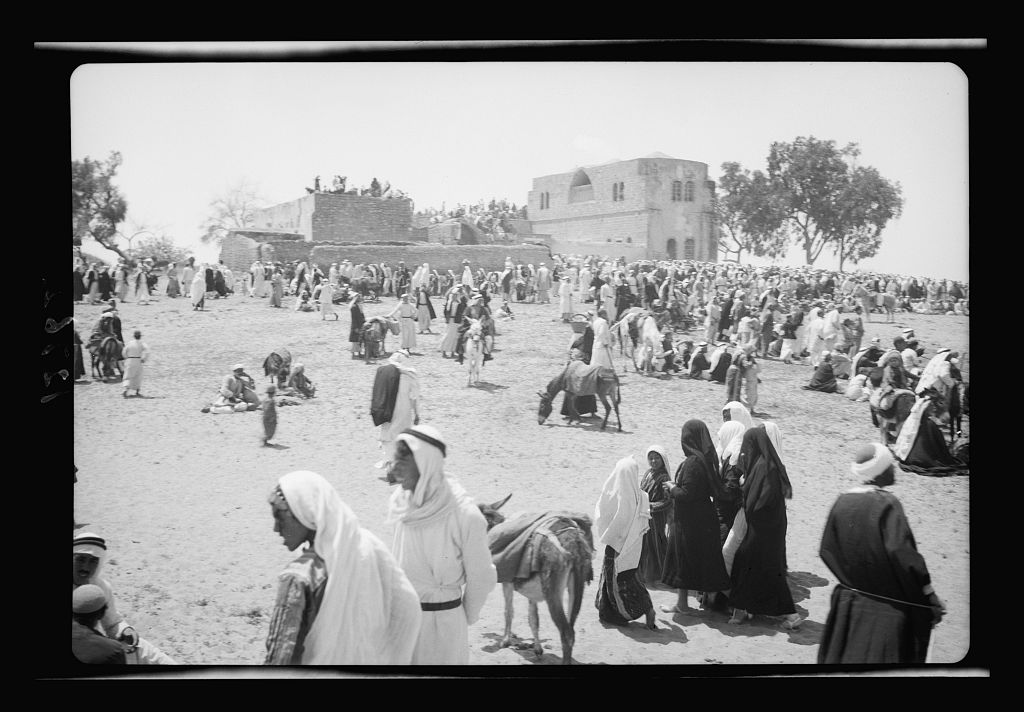
April 1943, with the shrine in the background.

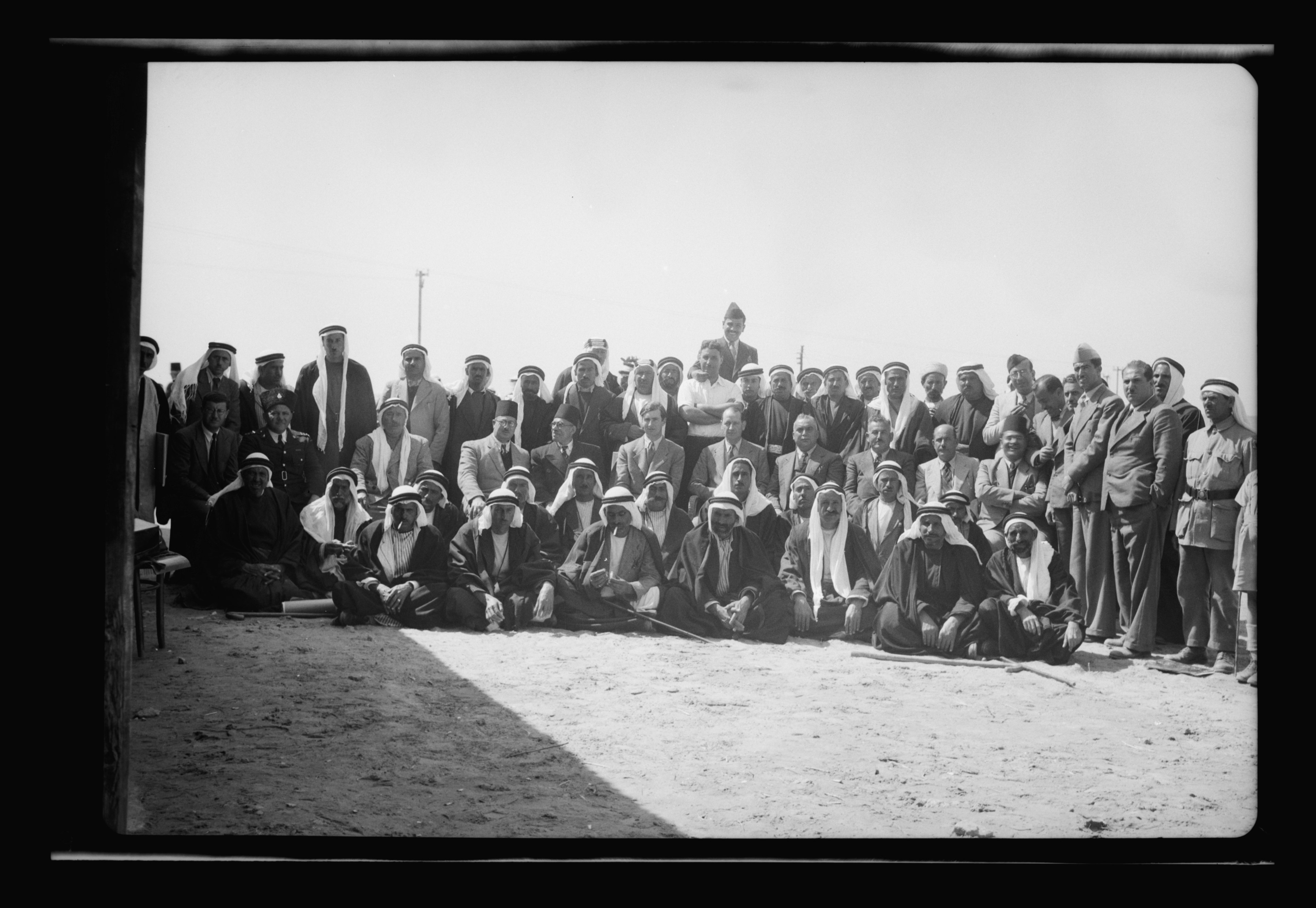
Celebrations in April 1943, with Aref al-Aref and Julian Asquith, 2nd Earl of Oxford and Asquith visiting.

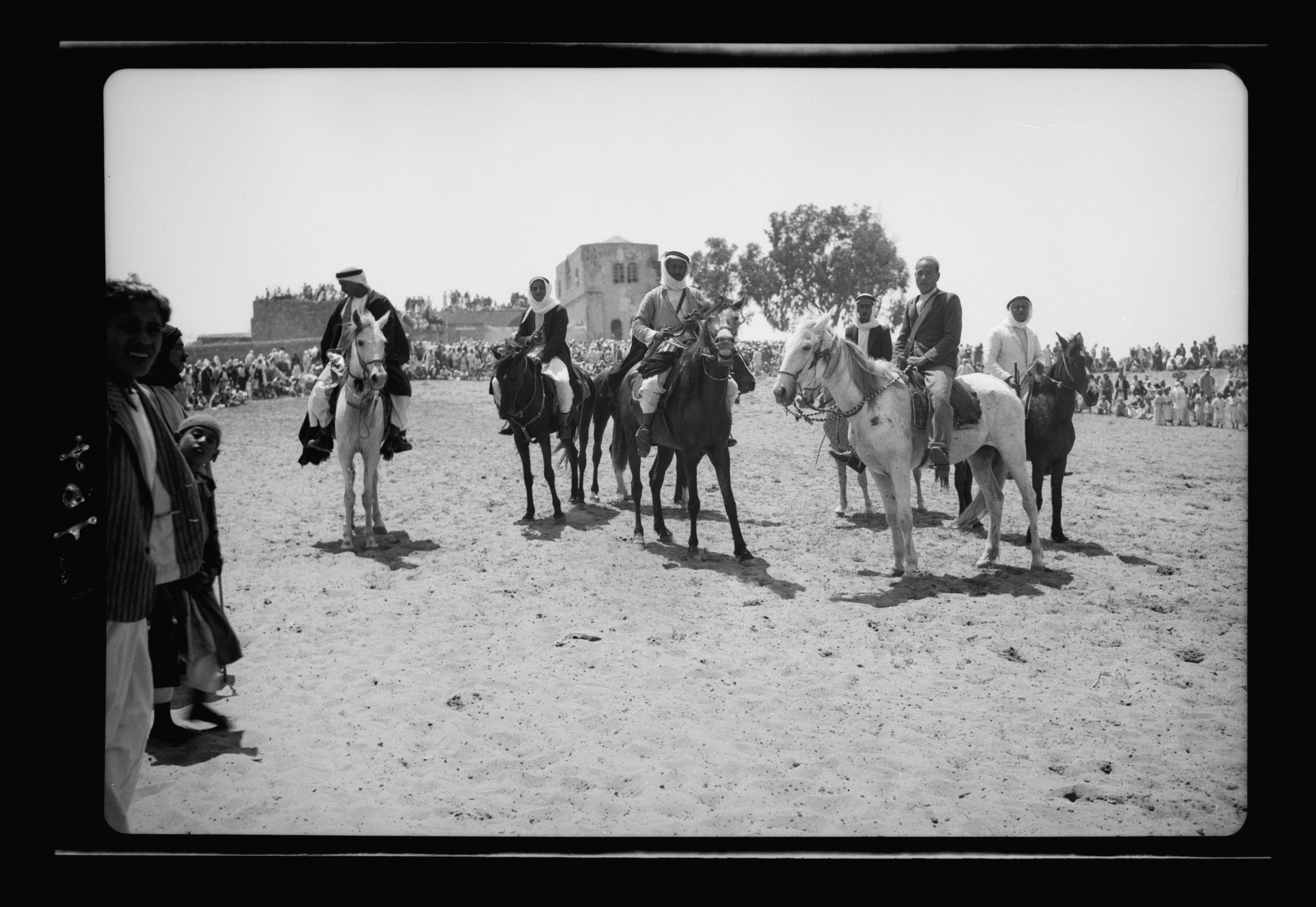
April 1943

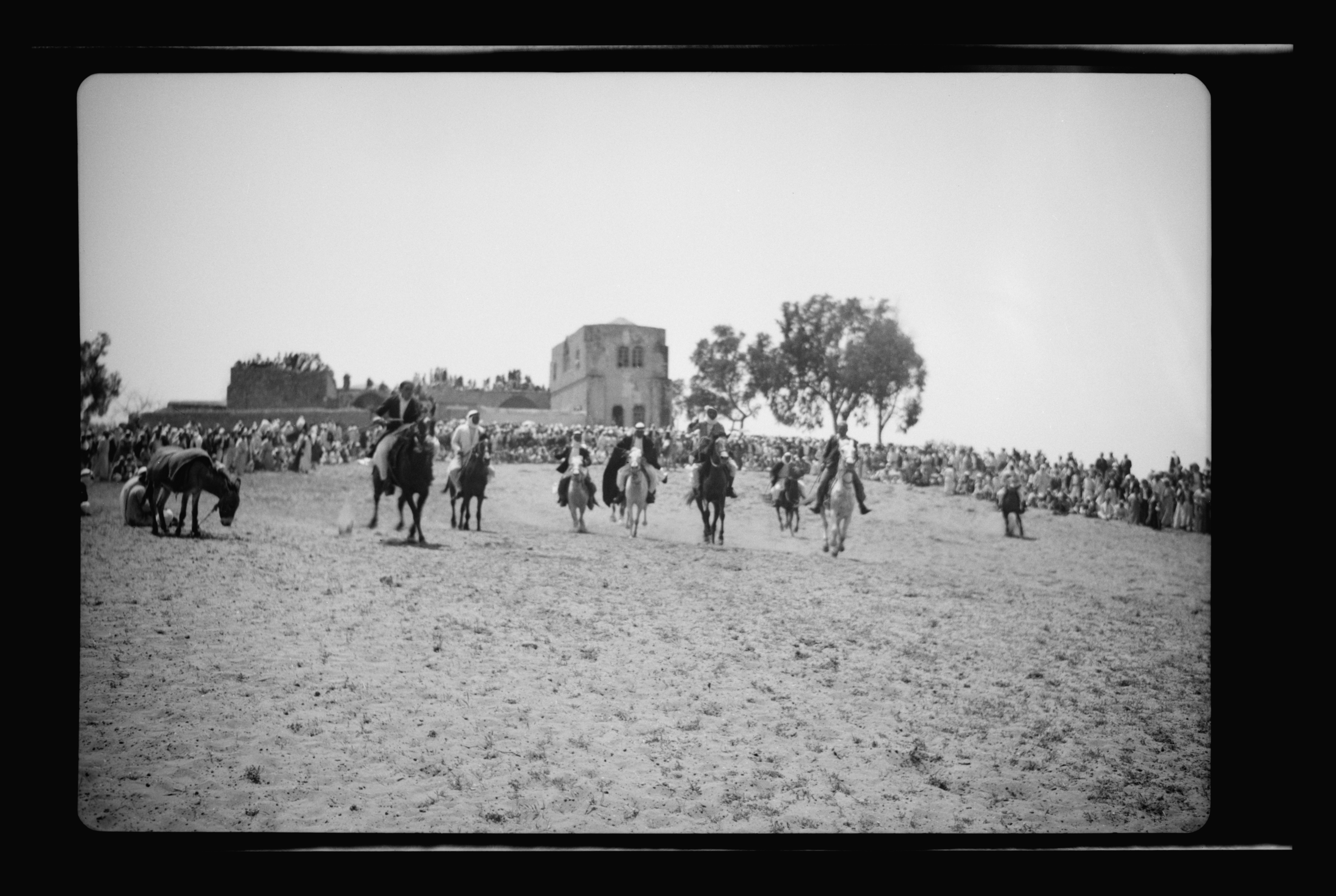
April 1943

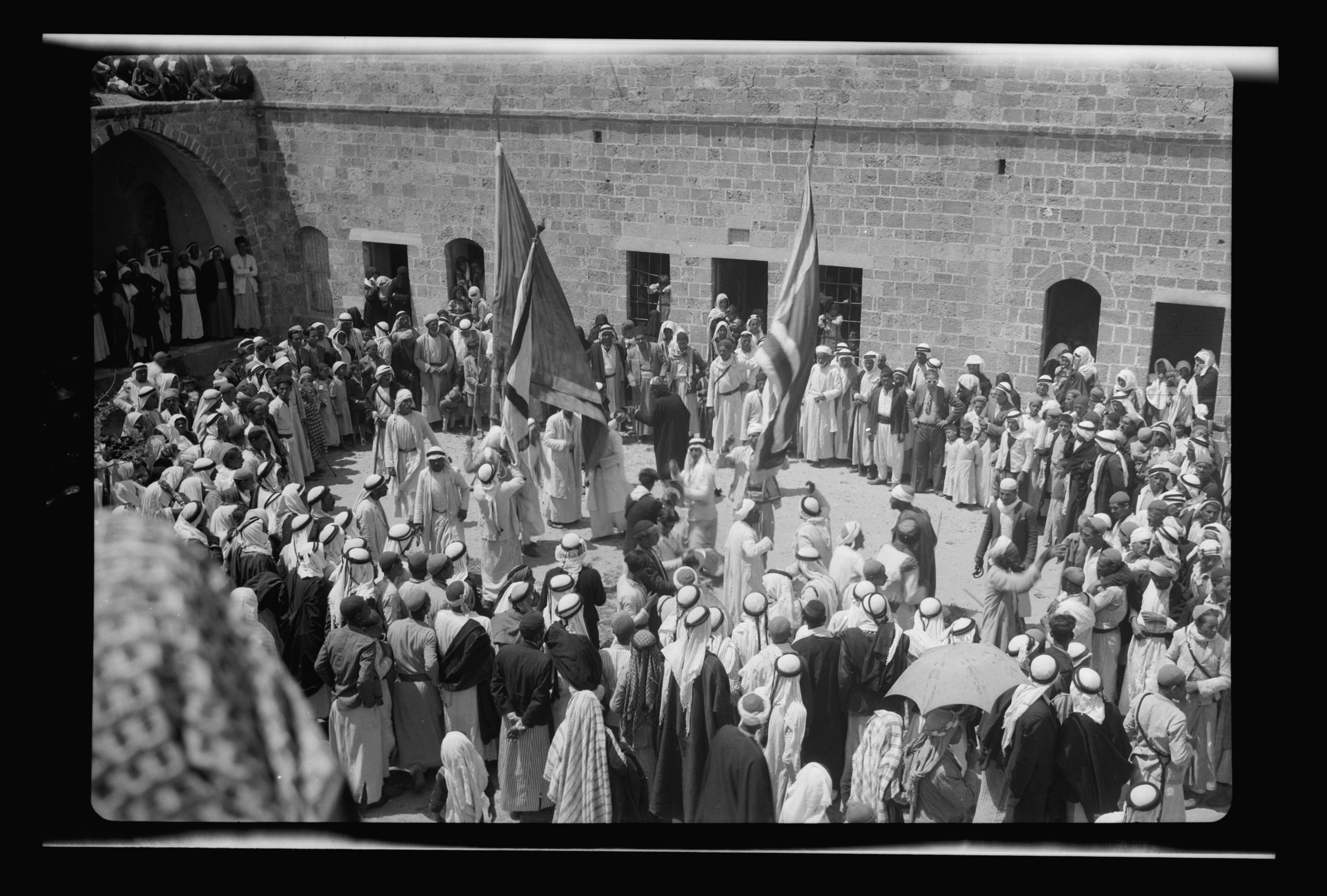
April 1943

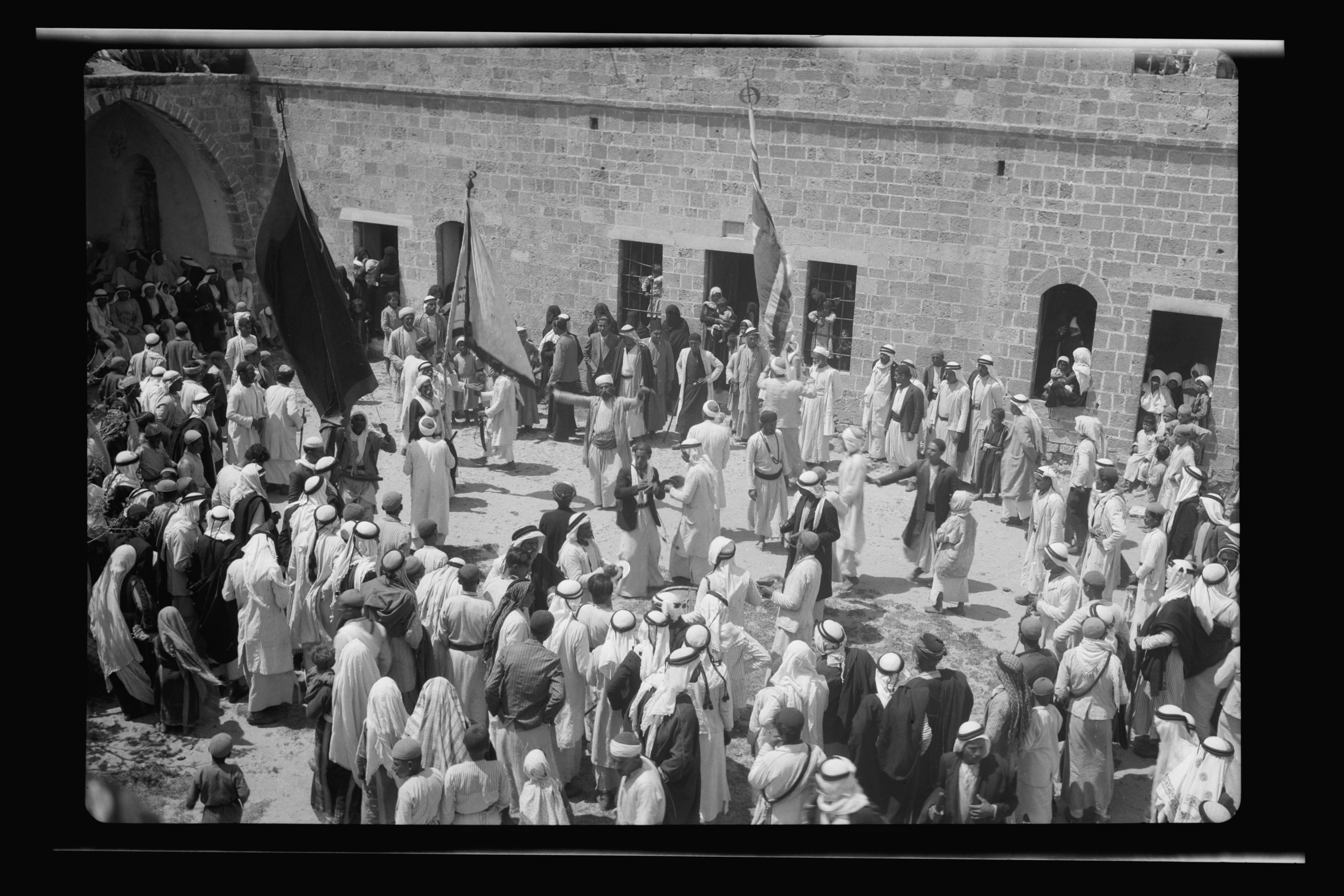
April 1943

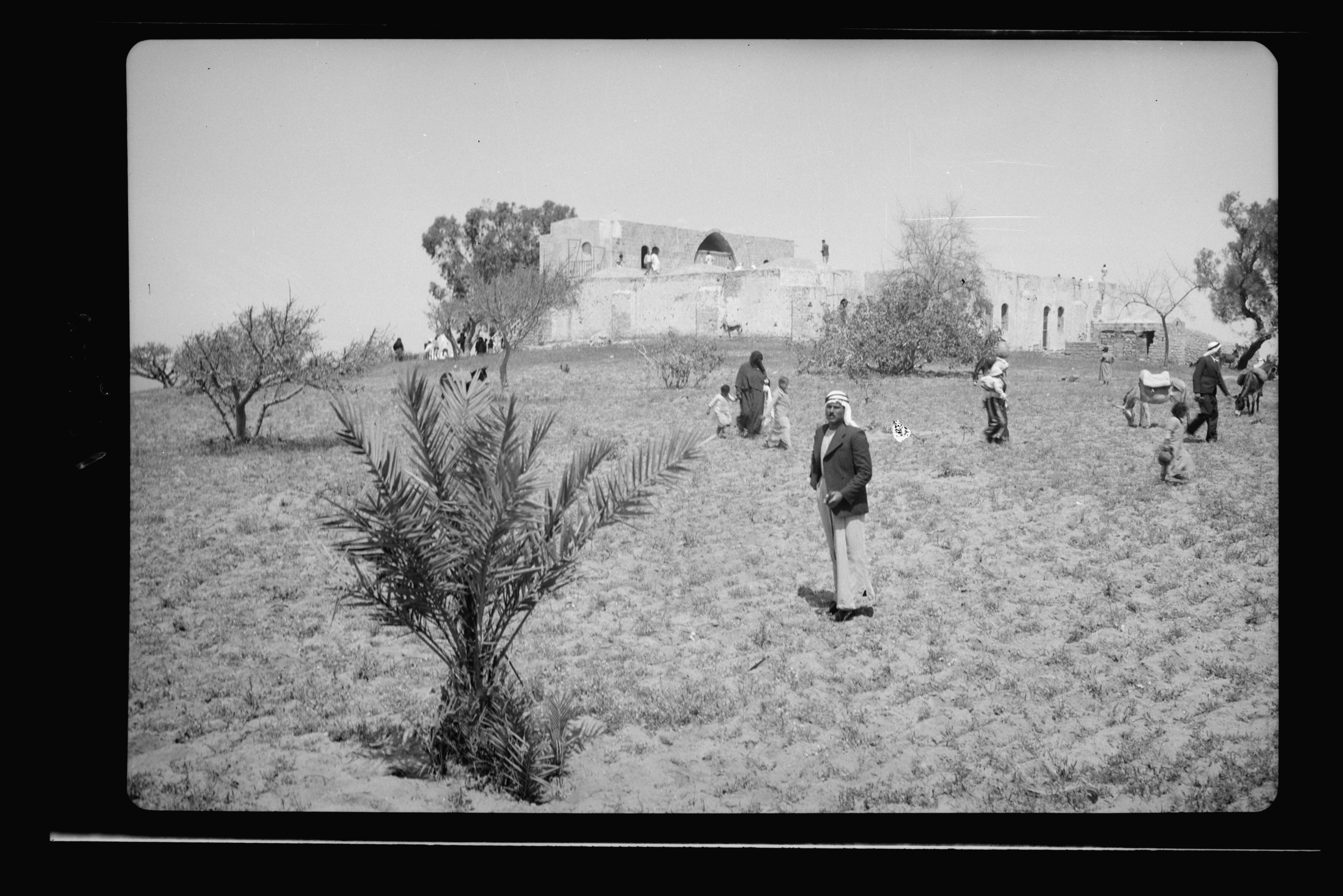
April 1943

== Destruction in 1950 ==
In July 1950, the shrine was destroyed at the instructions of Moshe Dayan in accordance with a 1950s Israeli policy of erasing Muslim historical sites within Israel in order to assist the eviction of remaining Palestinians. The site is now contained within the grounds of the Barzilai Medical Center.

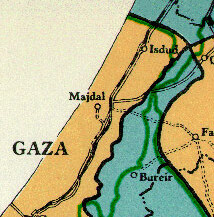
The area around the shrine had been allocated to the Arab state in the United Nations Partition Plan for Palestine

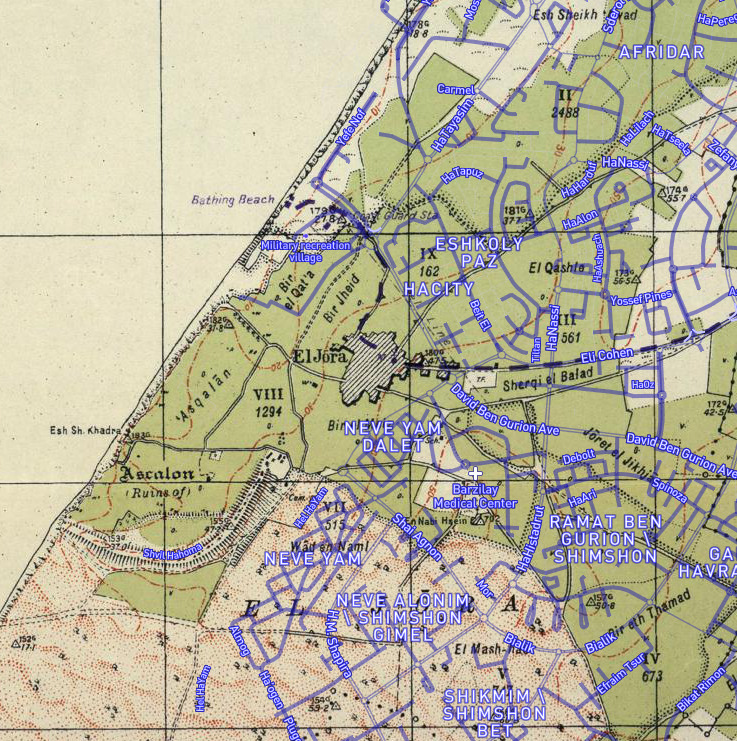
En Nabi Hsein can be seen in the grounds of the Barzilai Medical Center; this image overlays the modern Israeli city of Ashkelon (blue) on a 1940s Survey of Palestine map

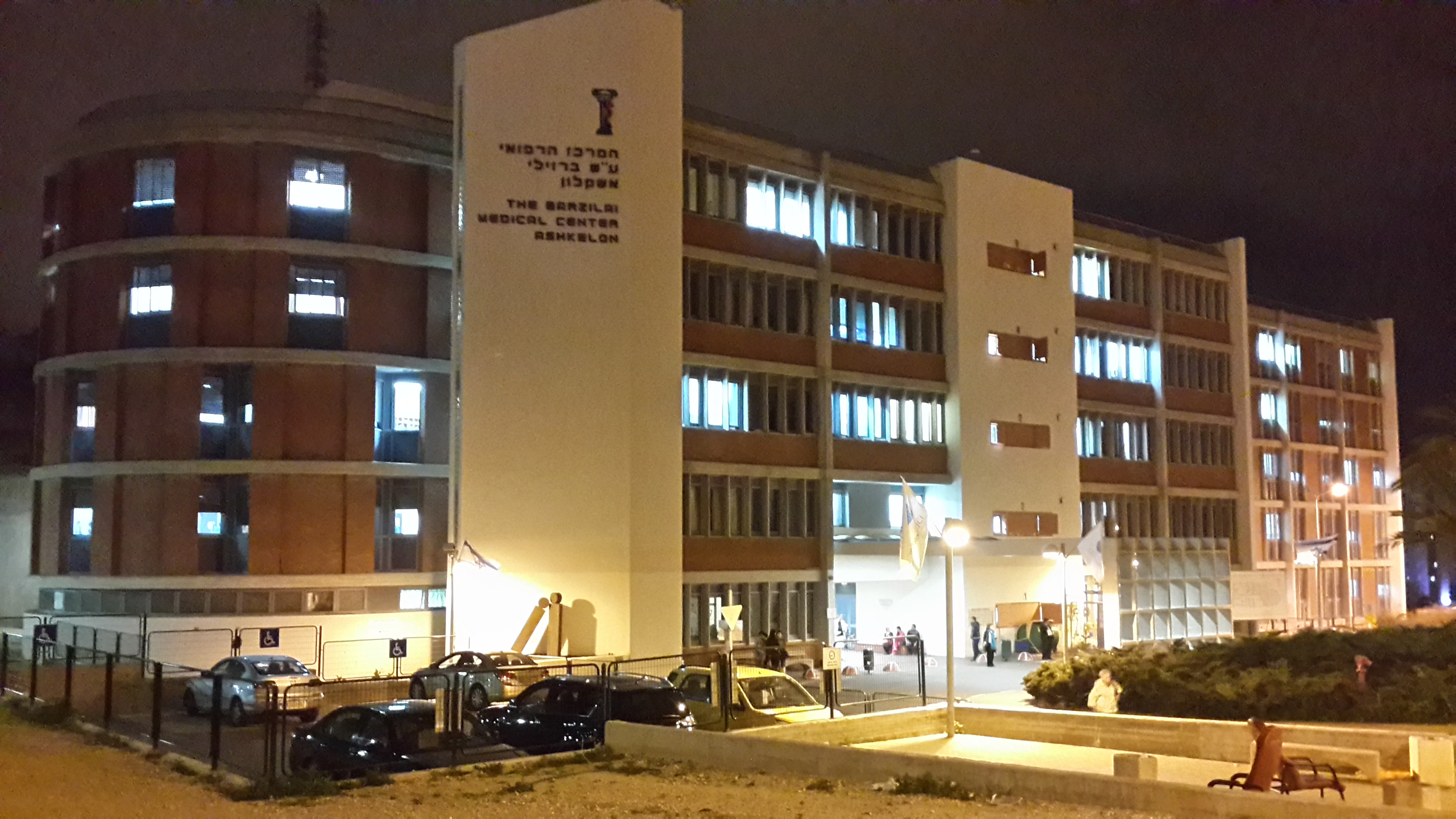
Barzilai Medical Center that today stands on the grounds of the erstwhile mausoleum.

== Reestablishment in 2000 ==
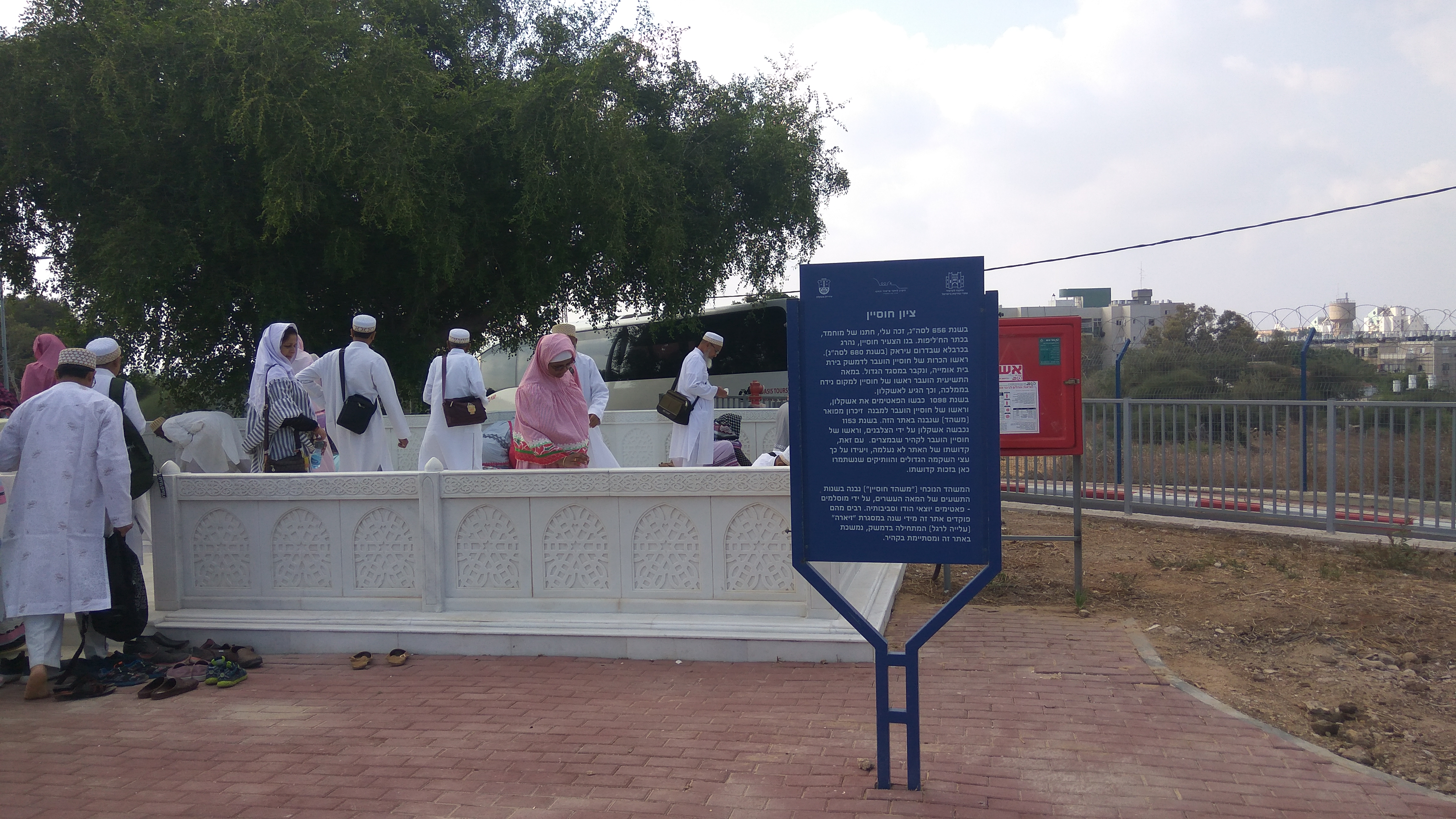
Dawoodi Bohra pilgrims at the newly constructed shrine platform on the hospital grounds, August 2019.

The area was razed and subsequently redeveloped for a local Israeli hospital, Barzilai.

After the site was re-identified on the hospital grounds, funds from Mohammed Burhanuddin, the 52nd Da'i al-Mutlaq of the Dawoodi Bohras, a Shi'a Ismaili sect of predominantly Gujarati descent based in India, were used to construct a marble prayer platform.

Dawoodi Bohra pilgrims from India and Pakistan continue to visit Ashkelon despite resulting complications in travelling to other Muslim nations.

Historically the shrine was also a site of pilgrimage for Palestinian Sunnis.

== Bibliography ==
- Bloom, J. M.; Blair, S., eds. (2009). "Minbar". The Grove Encyclopedia of Islamic Art and Architecture. Oxford University Press. ISBN 9780195309911.
- Borhany, Abbas (2009) [published in Daily News, Karachi, Pakistan on 3 January 2009 and Yemen Times, Sanaa, Yemen on 26 January 2009]. "Brief History of Transfer of the Sacred Head of Hussain ibn Ali, From Damascus to Ashkelon to Qahera". Archived from the original (PDF) on 2017-12-14 – via Durrenajaf. Also at "Journey of Imam Husian's Head From Syria To Egypt". Scribd. Uploaded by Aliakbar Ismail Kathanawala; and Islamic Collections, 29 January 2009
- Brett, Michael (2017). The Fatimid Empire. Edinburgh: Edinburgh University Press. ISBN 9781474421522.
- Hartmann, R. & Lewis, B. (1960). "Askalan". In Gibb, H. A. R.; Kramers, J. H.; Lévi-Provençal, E.; Schacht, J.; Lewis, B. & Pellat, Ch. (eds.). The Encyclopaedia of Islam, Second Edition. Volume I: A–B. Leiden: E. J. Brill. pp. 710–711. OCLC 495469456.
- Moudjir ed-dyn (1876). Sauvaire (ed.). Histoire de Jérusalem et d'Hébron depuis Abraham jusqu'à la fin du XVe siècle de J.-C.: fragments de la Chronique de Moudjir-ed-dyn. pp. 16, 68, 214.
- Petersen, A. (2017). "Shrine of Husayn's Head". Bones of Contention: Muslim Shrines in Palestine. Heritage Studies in the Muslim World. Springer Singapore. ISBN 978-981-10-6965-9.
- Rapoport, Meron (Winter 2008). "History Erased the IDF and the Post––1948 Destruction of Palestinian Monuments". Journal of Palestine Studies. 37 (2). Informa UK Limited: 82–88. doi:10.1525/jps.2008.37.2.82. ISSN 0377-919X. JSTOR 10.1525/jps.2008.37.2.82.
- Talmon-Heller, Daniella; Kedar, B. Z.; Reiter, Y. (January 2016). "Vicissitudes of a Holy Place: Construction, Destruction and Commemoration of Mashhad Ḥusayn in Ascalon". Der Islam. 93 (1). Walter de Gruyter. doi:10.1515/islam-2016-0008. ISSN 1613-0928.
- Talmon-Heller, Daniella (2020). "Part I: A Sacred Place: The Shrine of al-Husayn's Head". Sacred Place and Sacred Time in the Medieval Islamic Middle East: An Historical Perspective. University Press Scholarship Online. doi:10.3366/edinburgh/9781474460965.001.0001. ISBN 9781474460965. S2CID 240874864.
- Williams, Caroline (1983). "The Cult of 'Alid Saints in the Fatimid Monuments of Cairo. Part I: The Mosque of al-Aqmar". In Oleg Grabar (ed.). Muqarnas I: An Annual on Islamic Art and Architecture. New Haven: Yale University Press. pp. 37–52.

== See also ==
- Al Husayn Shrine
- Al Hussein Mosque
- The Great Mosque of Damascus
