= Denis Michael Rohan =

Australian arsonist (1941-2013)

- Rohan on trial in Israel, 7 October 1969
- Born: July 1, 1941; Grenfell, New South Wales, Australia
- Died: March 20, 2013 (aged 71)
- Known for: 1969 arson attack on Al-Aqsa Mosque

Denis Michael Rohan (1 July 1941 – 20 March 2013) was an Australian arsonist responsible for the Al-Aqsa mosque fire, which took place in Jerusalem on 21 August 1969.

His attack on Al-Aqsa Mosque, which began after he set fire to the Minbar of Saladin, inflamed tensions across the Muslim world and triggered the most high-level crisis in the Middle East since the 1967 Arab–Israeli War.

Rohan was arrested by Israeli authorities on 23 August 1969; he was tried in Israel, found to be insane, and subsequently admitted to a mental institution. On 14 May 1974, Rohan was deported to Australia "on humanitarian grounds, for further psychiatric treatment near his family" and transferred to the Callan Park Hospital on the outskirts of Sydney. Some sources claimed that he had died on 6 October 1995, but a 2009 investigation by the Australian Broadcasting Corporation (ABC) found that he was still alive. Rohan also spoke to an ABC journalist a few years after the findings, but died on 20 March 2013.

== Mental illness and religious convictions ==
According to a detailed article by Abraham Rabinovich, Rohan's first known case of auditory hallucinations (which he believed to be divine "revelations") came in Australia in 1964, when he was asked by his employer to transport "an augur, [sic] a 30-foot-long lift device" by truck 35 miles to another location, but was commanded by a voice in his head not to do so. His manager told him he was "mentally sick", and he was committed to Bloomfield Mental Hospital for four months. After his release he moved first to England where he worked at a hospital in Middlesex, and then to Israel where he arrived by ship in March 1969. He volunteered at Mishmar Hasharon kibbutz in the Sharon Valley between Haifa and Tel Aviv where he stayed a few months. According to kibbutzniks, one night they were startled by wild shouts from Rohan; when one volunteer attempted to calm him, Rohan told them he thought that perhaps he was Jewish. He spoke to an American theology student and volunteer of "the imminence of the Messiah's coming and the construction of a new temple".

From the kibbutz he went to Jerusalem, staying in hotels. After reading a biblical passage in the Book of Zechariah:

Behold the man whose name is the branch, for he shall grow up in his place and he shall build the Temple of the Lord. It is he who shall build the Temple of the Lord and shall bear royal honor and shall sit and rule upon the throne.

Rohan became convinced that he was "the branch" and destined to "build the Temple of the Lord".

== 1969 attack on Al-Aqsa Mosque ==
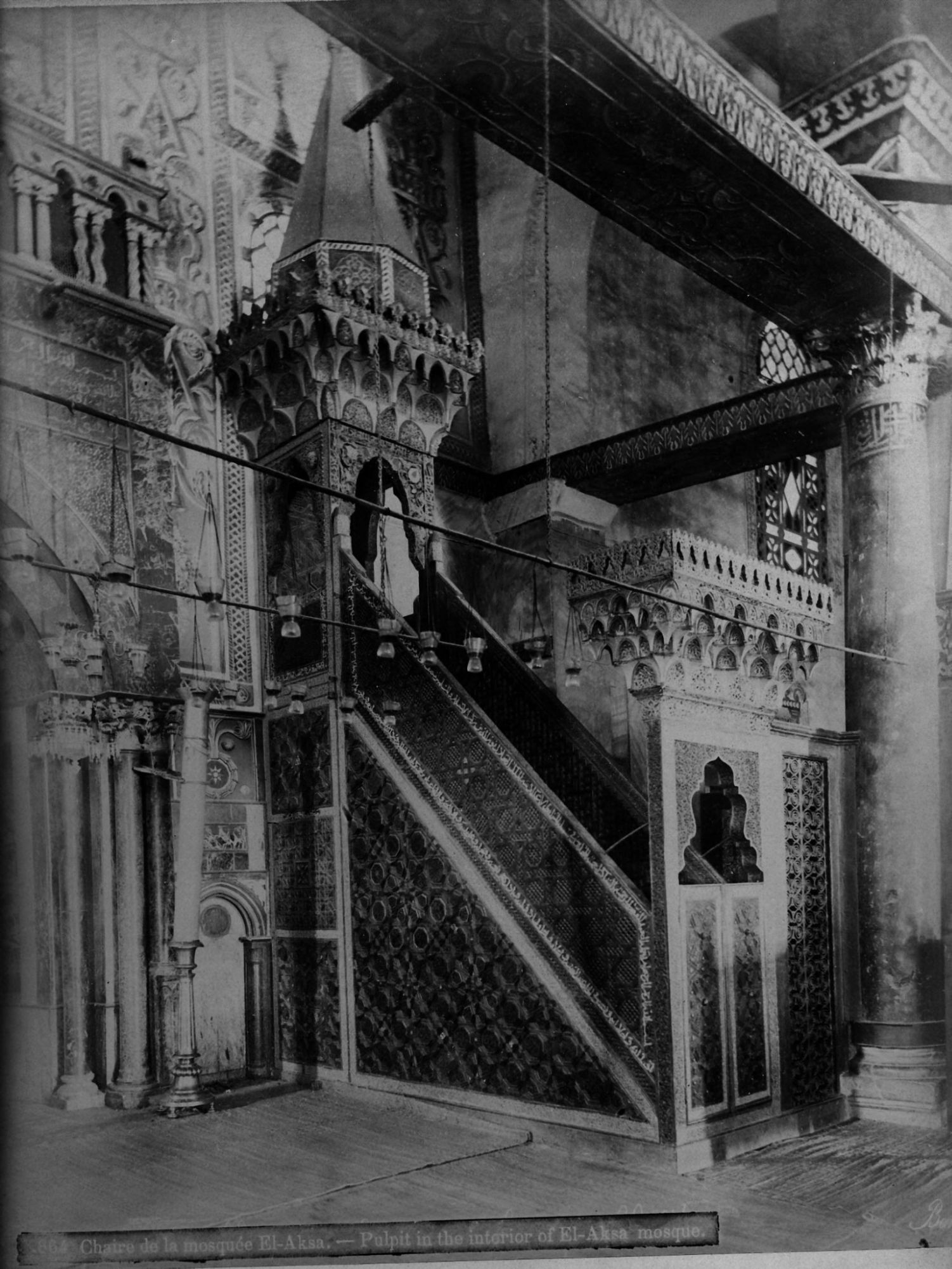
The minbar of Saladin in the al-Aqsa Mosque (c. 1900–1910)

On the morning of 21 August 1969, Rohan started a fire fuelled by kerosene in the al-Aqsa Mosque. The fire destroyed an intricately designed 12th-century minbar, or pulpit, known as the minbar of Saladin.

Rohan, who had been in Israel on a tourist visa, was arrested two days later. He pleaded insanity and was deported.

=== Motives ===
Rohan, a Christian, stated that he considered himself "the Lord's emissary" and that he tried to destroy the al-Aqsa Mosque acting upon divine instructions to enable the Jews of Israel to rebuild the Temple on the Temple Mount in accordance with the Book of Zechariah, thereby hastening the second coming of Jesus Christ. Rohan mistakenly believed that the al-Aqsa Mosque occupied the site of the temple, when in fact the Dome of the Rock did. The mosque was instead built on the foundations of a Herodian basilica called the Royal Stoa.

Rohan was a subscriber of The Plain Truth magazine published by the Worldwide Church of God's (WCG) founder Herbert W. Armstrong and stated that he had begun his attempt after reading an editorial by Armstrong in the June 1967 edition. The Daily Telegraph newspaper in London pictured Rohan on its front page with a copy of The Plain Truth magazine sticking out from his outside jacket pocket.

On 26 September 1969, Armstrong, in a letter to financial contributors to his The World Tomorrow program, distanced himself from Rohan:

Every effort, it seems, is being made to link us with it in a way to discredit the Work of God. The man, Rohan being held as the arsonist, the dispatches say, claims to be identified with us. This claim is TOTALLY FALSE. The first any of us at Pasadena ever heard of this man was when the press dispatches began coming over the Teletypes in our News Bureau. Checkups revealed that this man had sent in for and received a number of our Correspondence Course lessons. Last December he had sent in a subscription to The PLAIN TRUTH. But any claim to any further connection or association with us is an absolute lie.
Two million others subscribe to The PLAIN TRUTH. 100,000 others subscribe to the Correspondence Course lessons. These are sent to any and everybody who requests them, FREE. But such subscriptions do not connect us with such subscribers or any act any one of them might commit, any more than a subscription to the New York Times makes that newspaper responsible for any acts committed by its subscribers.

Prior to the Rohan incident, in 1968 Armstrong, via WCG's sponsored Ambassador College, had become involved with the Israeli government in archaeological digs in the area of the Temple Mount.

=== Allegations of Israeli complicity ===
Many Muslims alleged Rohan's actions were part of a wider plot by Israelis, while some Israelis have attacked widely-repeated claims by some Palestinians and other Muslims that Rohan was Jewish, when in fact he was Christian. Palestinian officials have alleged that the arson was carried out with the blessing of Israeli authorities and minimize the culpability of Rohan, while Israeli firefighters at the scene later complained that the hostility directed at them by an assembled crowd of Palestinians interfered with their ability to put out the fire.

== See also ==
- 1975 in Prophecy!
- Ambassador Auditorium
- Ambassador College and Ambassador University
- Garner Ted Armstrong
- Cave of the Patriarchs massacre
- Jerusalem syndrome
- Lost Ten Tribes
- Stanley Rader
- Radio Church of God
