= Al-Jura =

al-Jura الجورة
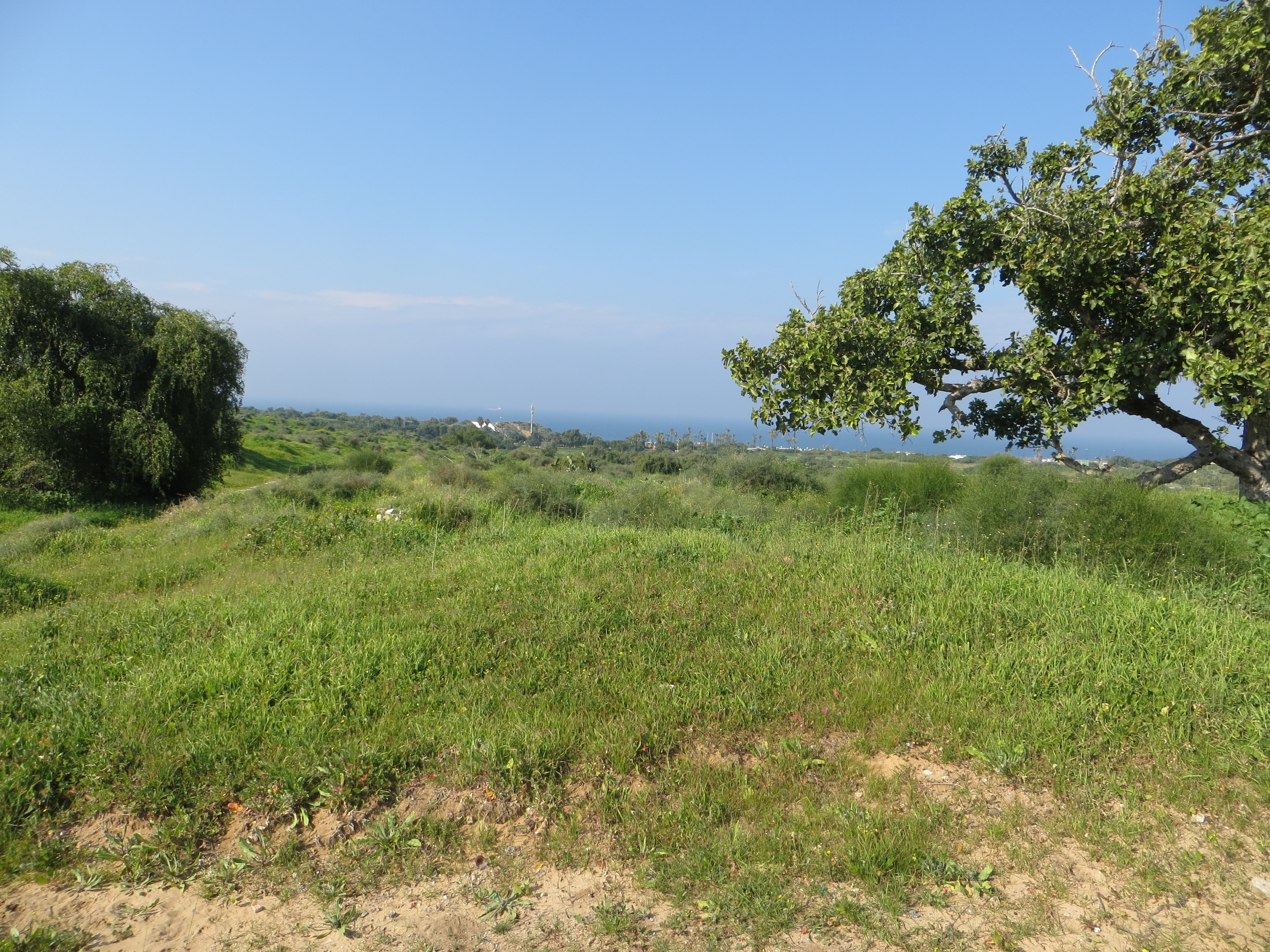
- Part of the former village site, in 2015
- Etymology: the Hollow
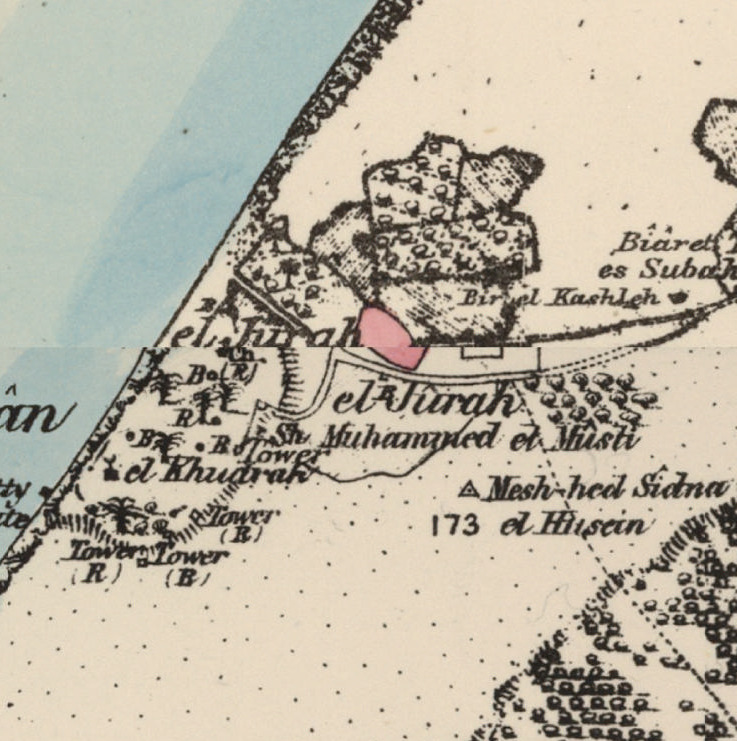
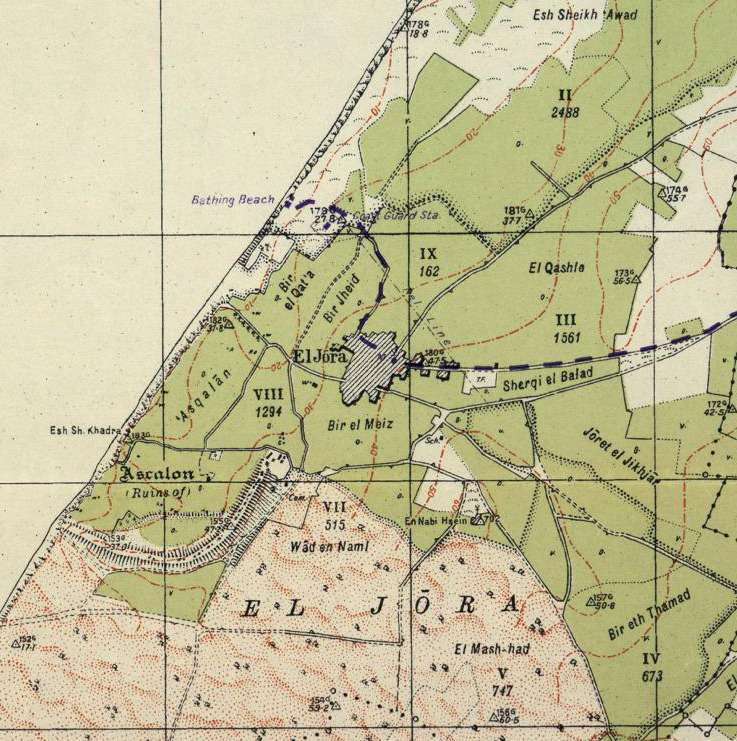
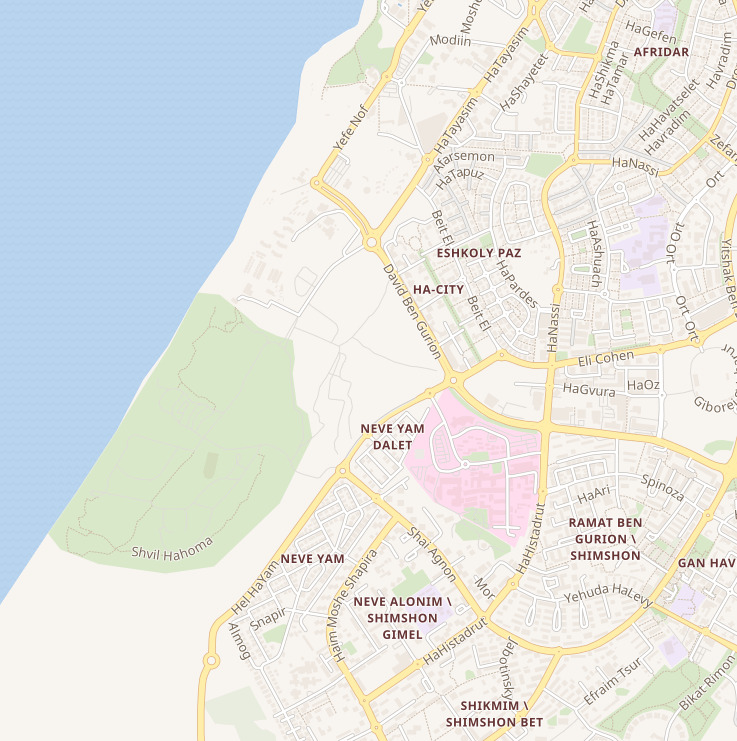
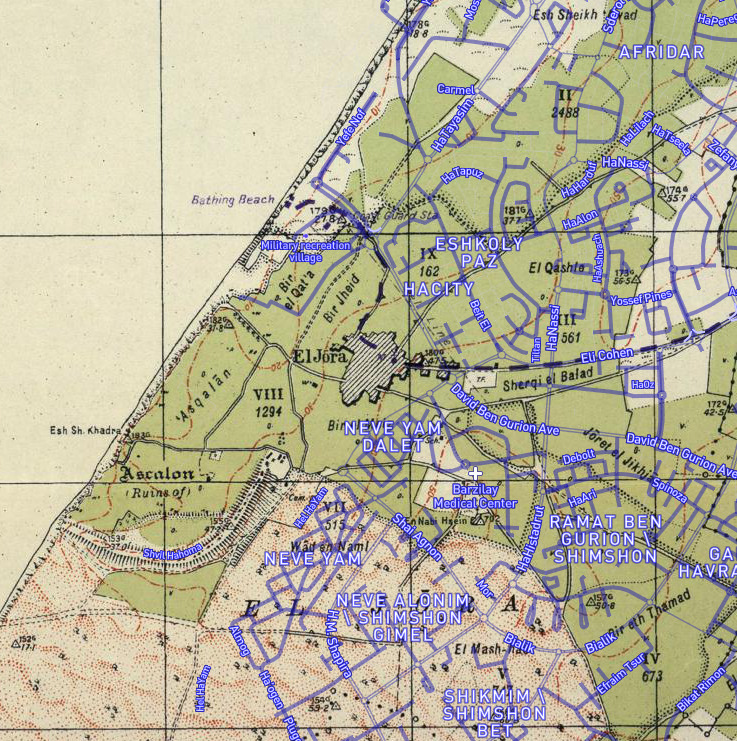
- 1870s map 1940s map modern map 1940s with modern overlay map A series of historical maps of the area around Al-Jura (click the buttons)

- Location within the Mandatory Palestine
- Coordinates: 31°39′57″N 34°33′17″E
- Palestine grid: 107/119
- Geopolitical entity: Mandatory Palestine
- Subdistrict: Gaza
- Date of depopulation: November 4–5, 1948

Area
  - Total: 12,224 dunams (12.224 km^{2}; 4.720 sq mi)

Population (1945)
  - Total: 2,420
- Cause(s) of depopulation: Military assault by Yishuv forces
- Current Localities: Ashkelon

Al-Jura (Arabic: الجورة), was a Palestinian village that was depopulated by Israeli militias during the 1948 Arab-Israeli war, located immediately adjacent to the towns of Ashkelon and the ruins of ancient Ascalon. In 1945, the village had a population of approximately 2,420 mostly Muslim inhabitants. Though defended by the Egyptian Army, al-Jura was nevertheless captured by Israel's Givati Brigade in a November 4, 1948, offensive as part of Operation Yoav.

Its residents had their origins in Egypt, Hebron, and Bedouin communities.

The Shrine of Husayn's Head was located outside the town, until it was destroyed by the Israeli army in 1950.

The founder and spiritual leader of the Hamas militant organization Ahmed Yassin was born in al-Jura.

== History ==
Al-Jura (El-Jurah) stood northeast of and immediately adjacent to the mound of ancient and medieval Ascalon. It was situated in the depression between the kurkar ridge and the ramparts of ancient Tel Ashkelon.

Byzantine ceramics have been found here, together with coins dating to the seventh century CE.

=== Ottoman era ===
In the first Ottoman tax register of 1526/7 the village was unpopulated. By 1596 CE, however, the village had been refounded as part of the nahiya of Gaza and named Jawrat al-Hajja. It had 46 Muslim households, an estimated population of 253; who paid a total of 3,400 akçe in taxes.

Marom and Taxel have shown that during the seventeenth to eighteenth centuries, nomadic economic and security pressures led to settlement abandonment around Majdal ‘Asqalān, and the southern coastal plain in general. The population of abandoned villages moved to surviving settlements, while the lands of abandoned settlements continued to be cultivated by neighboring villages. Thus, al-Jura absorbed the lands of al-Rasm and al-Bira, the last one separated from the village by the lands of al-Majdal.

The Syrian Sufi teacher and traveller Mustafa al-Bakri al-Siddiqi (1688–1748/9) visited Al-Jura in the first half of the eighteenth century, before leaving for Hamama.

19th-century travelers celebrated the village for its highly productive fruit orchards and early-ripening vegetables. To irrigate these dune-adjacent plots, local farmers relied on a distinct regional water-lifting technology—a self-emptying leather bucket pulled along an inclined ramp by draft animals over wooden drums or reused ancient marble posts.

In 1838, Edward Robinson noted el-Jurah as a Muslim village, located in the Gaza district.

In 1863 the French explorer Victor Guérin visited the village, which he called Djoura, and found it to have three hundred inhabitants. He further noted that he could see numerous antiquities, taken from the ruined city, and that the inhabitants of the village grew handsome fruit trees, as well as flowers and vegetables. An Ottoman village list from about 1870 found that the village had a population of 340, in a total of 109 houses, though the population count included men, only.

In the late nineteenth century, the village of Al-Jura was situated on flat ground bordering on the ruins of ancient Ascalon. It was rectangular in shape and the residents were Muslim. They had a mosque and a school which was founded in 1919.

=== British Mandate era ===
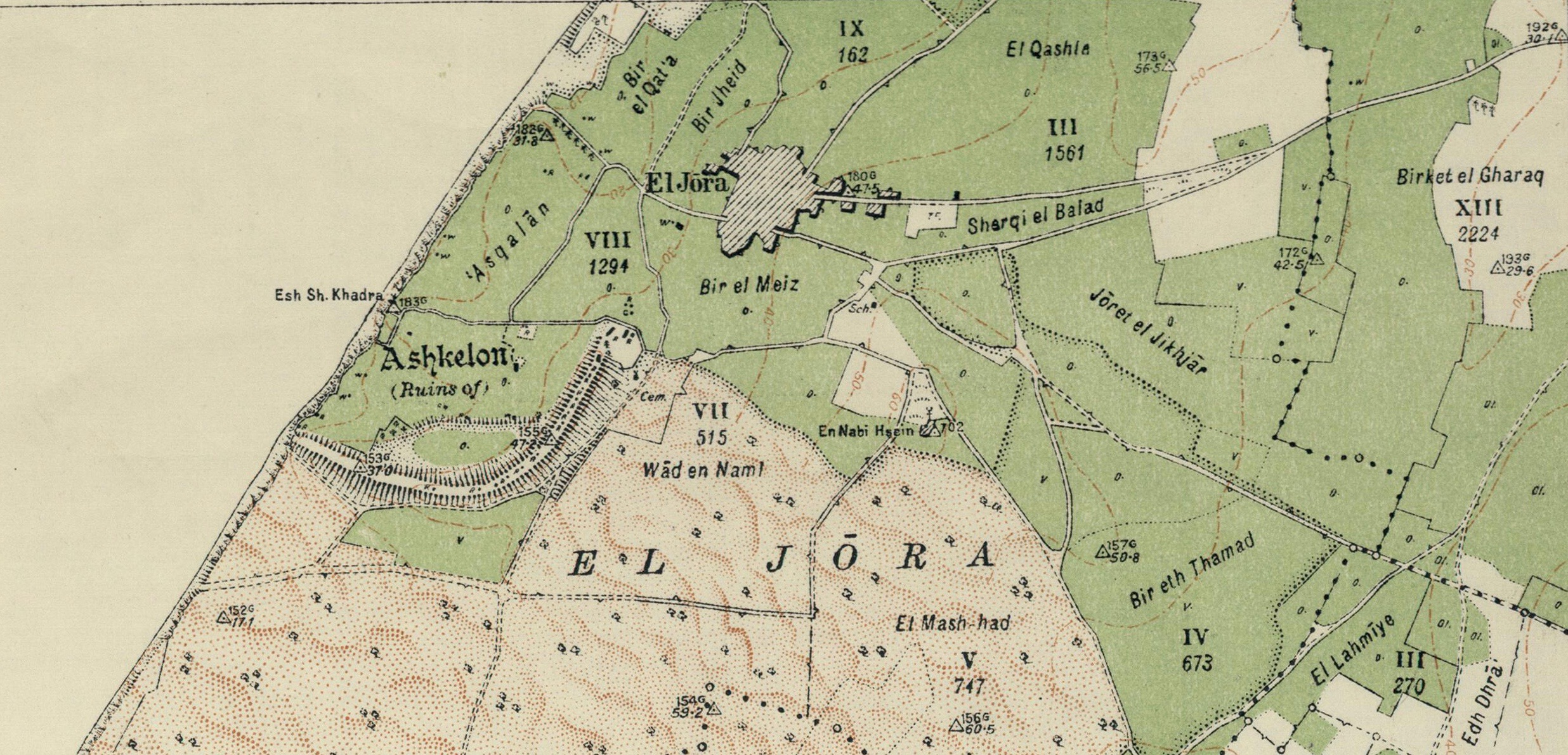
Al-Jura, 1931 (1:200,000)

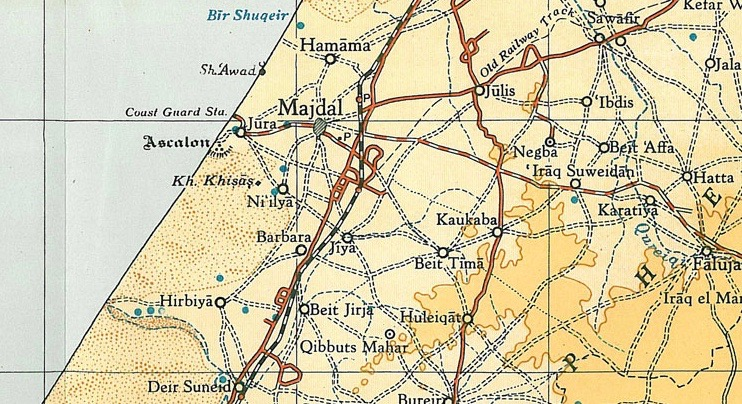
Al-Jura, 1945 (1:250,000)

In the 1922 census of Palestine conducted by the British Mandate authorities, Jura had a population of 1,326 inhabitants, all Muslims, increasing in the 1931 census to 1,754, consisting of 1752 Muslims and 2 Christians, in a total of 396 houses.

By the 1940s the school had 206 students.

In the 1945 Village Statistics El Jura had an estimated population of 2,420 Muslims, with a total of 12,224 dunams of land, according to an official land and population survey. Of this, 481 dunams were used for citrus and bananas, 7,192 for plantations and irrigable land, 2,965 for cereals, while 45 dunams were built-up land.

In addition to agriculture, residents practiced animal husbandry which formed was an important source of income for the town. In 1943, they owned 115 heads of cattle, 7 sheep over a year old, 92 goats over a year old, 47 camels, 7 horses, a mule, 130 donkeys, 970 fowls, and 227 pigeons.

=== 1948 War ===
At the end of November 1948, Coastal Plain District troops carried out sweeps of the villages around and to the south of Majdal. Al-Jura was one of the villages named in the orders to the IDF battalions and engineers platoon, that the villagers were to be expelled to Gaza, and the IDF troops were "to prevent their return by destroying their villages". The path leading to the village was to be mined. The IDF troops were ordered to carry out the operation "with determination, accuracy and energy". The operation took place on 30 November. The troops found "not a living soul" in Al-Jura. However, the destruction of the villages was not completed immediately due to the dampness of the houses and the insufficient amount of explosives.

In 1992, the village site was described: "Only one of the village houses has been spared; thorny plants grow on the parts of the site not built over by Ashqelon." The site is incorporated into Ashkelon National Park.

== Shrine of Husayn's Head ==
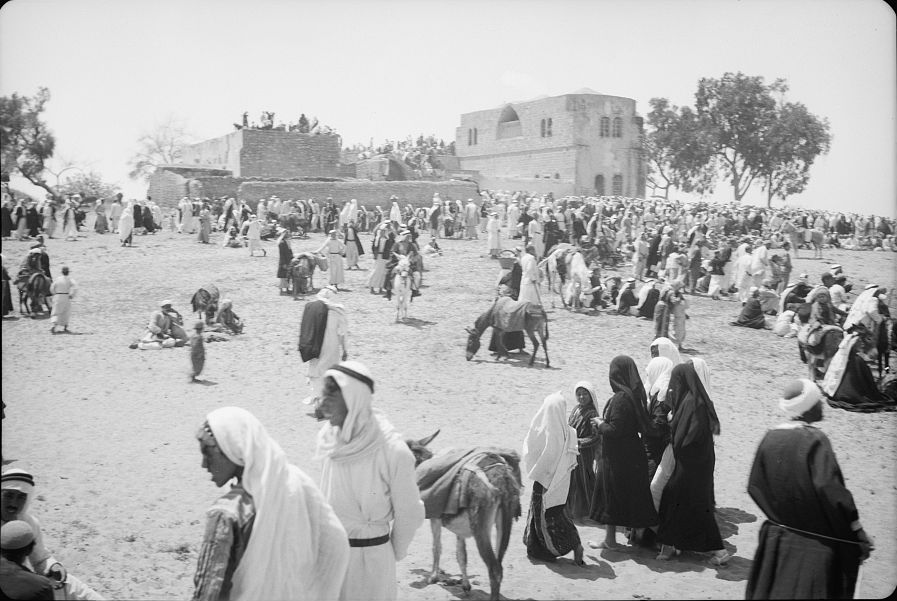
The shrine during the annual festival

The Shrine of Husayn's Head was a Fatimid-era shrine located on a hill outside Al-Jura that was reputed to have held the head of Husayn ibn Ali between c.906 CE and 1153 CE.

It was considered the most important Shi'a shrine in Palestine, but was destroyed by the Israeli army in 1950, a year after hostilities ended, on the orders of Moshe Dayan. It is thought that the demolition was related to efforts to expel the remaining Palestinian Arabs from the region.

== Notable residents ==
- Ahmed Yassin
- The parents of Ismail Haniyeh.

== See also ==
- Depopulated Palestinian locations in Israel

== Bibliography ==
- Barron, J.B., ed. (1923). Palestine: Report and General Abstracts of the Census of 1922. Government of Palestine.
- Conder, C.R.; Kitchener, H.H. (1883). The Survey of Western Palestine: Memoirs of the Topography, Orography, Hydrography, and Archaeology. Vol. 3. London: Committee of the Palestine Exploration Fund.
- Dauphin, C. (1998). La Palestine byzantine, Peuplement et Populations. BAR International Series 726 (in French). Vol. III : Catalogue. Oxford: Archeopress. ISBN 0-860549-05-4.
- Department of Statistics (1945). Village Statistics, April, 1945. Government of Palestine.
- Guérin, V. (1869). Description Géographique Historique et Archéologique de la Palestine (in French). Vol. 1: Judee, pt. 2. Paris: L'Imprimerie Nationale. (p146: refer to Stanhope visit 1815, III, 152-169) 25 May
- Hadawi, S. (1970). Village Statistics of 1945: A Classification of Land and Area ownership in Palestine. Palestine Liberation Organization Research Center. Archived from the original on 2018-12-08.
- Hartmann, M. (1883). "Die Ortschaftenliste des Liwa Jerusalem in dem türkischen Staatskalender für Syrien auf das Jahr 1288 der Flucht (1871)". Zeitschrift des Deutschen Palästina-Vereins. 6: 102–149.
- Hütteroth, W.-D.; Abdulfattah, K. (1977). Historical Geography of Palestine, Transjordan and Southern Syria in the Late 16th Century. Erlanger Geographische Arbeiten, Sonderband 5. Erlangen, Germany: Vorstand der Fränkischen Geographischen Gesellschaft. ISBN 3-920405-41-2.
- Khalidi, W. (1992). All That Remains: The Palestinian Villages Occupied and Depopulated by Israel in 1948. Washington D.C.: Institute for Palestine Studies. ISBN 0-88728-224-5.
- Kogan-Zehavi, Elena (2006-08-02). "Ashqelon, el-Jura". Hadashot Arkheologiyot – Excavations and Surveys in Israel (118).
- Kogan-Zehavi, Elena (2011-09-26). "Ashqelon, el-Jura". Hadashot Arkheologiyot – Excavations and Surveys in Israel (123).
- Mills, E., ed. (1932). Census of Palestine 1931. Population of Villages, Towns and Administrative Areas. Jerusalem: Government of Palestine.
- Morris, B. (2004). The Birth of the Palestinian Refugee Problem Revisited. Cambridge University Press. ISBN 978-0-521-00967-6.
- Palmer, E.H. (1881). The Survey of Western Palestine: Arabic and English Name Lists Collected During the Survey by Lieutenants Conder and Kitchener, R. E. Transliterated and Explained by E.H. Palmer. Committee of the Palestine Exploration Fund.
- Peretz, Ilan; Eisenberg-Degen, Davida (2017-12-18). "Ashqelon, el-Jura". Hadashot Arkheologiyot – Excavations and Surveys in Israel (129).
- Petersen, A. (2017). "Shrine of Husayn's Head". Bones of Contention: Muslim Shrines in Palestine. Heritage Studies in the Muslim World. Springer Singapore. ISBN 978-981-10-6965-9.
- Robinson, E.; Smith, E. (1841). Biblical Researches in Palestine, Mount Sinai and Arabia Petraea: A Journal of Travels in the year 1838. Vol. 3. Boston: Crocker & Brewster.
- Socin, A. (1879). "Alphabetisches Verzeichniss von Ortschaften des Paschalik Jerusalem". Zeitschrift des Deutschen Palästina-Vereins. 2: 135–163.
- Talmon-Heller, Daniella; Kedar, B. Z.; Reiter, Y. (January 2016). "Vicissitudes of a Holy Place: Construction, Destruction and Commemoration of Mashhad Ḥusayn in Ascalon". Der Islam. 93 (1). Walter de Gruyter. doi:10.1515/islam-2016-0008. ISSN 1613-0928.
- Talmon-Heller, Daniella (2020). "Part I: A Sacred Place: The Shrine of al-Husayn's Head". Sacred Place and Sacred Time in the Medieval Islamic Middle East: An Historical Perspective. University Press Scholarship Online. doi:10.3366/edinburgh/9781474460965.001.0001. ISBN 9781474460965. S2CID 240874864.
