= Minbar of the Ibrahimi Mosque =

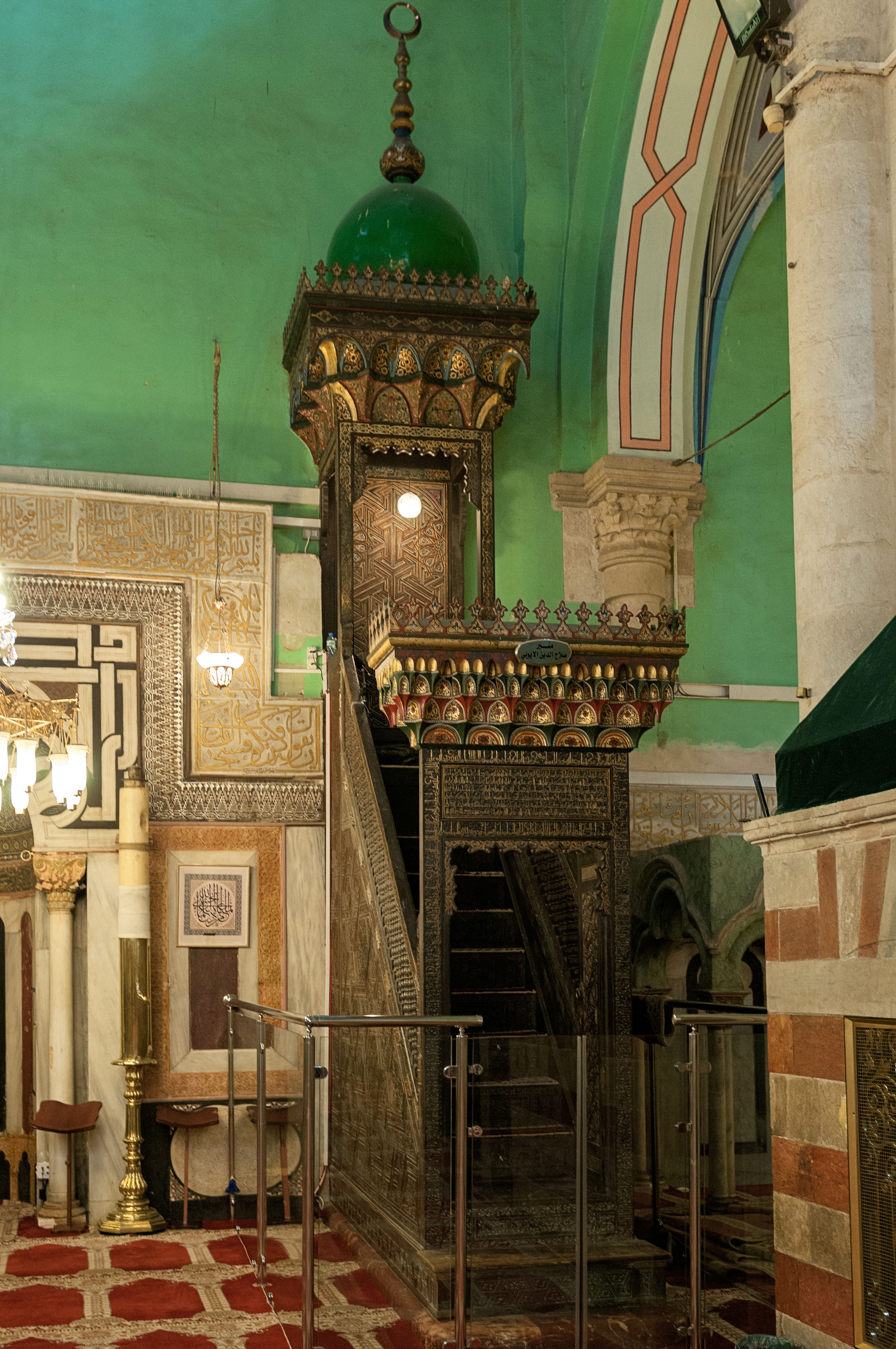
The minbar in the mosque

The minbar of the Ibrahimi Mosque is an 11th-century minbar (mosque pulpit) in the Ibrahimi Mosque (Cave of the Patriarchs) in Hebron, West Bank. The minbar was commissioned by the Fatimid vizier Badr al-Jamali in 1091 for the Shrine of Husayn's Head in Ascalon (present-day Ashkelon) but was moved to its current location by Salah ad-Din (Saladin) in 1191.

== History ==
The first minbar in the Muslim world was Muhammad's minbar in Medina produced in 629. In later periods minbars were produced for every major Friday mosque and developed into a symbol of political and religious legitimacy. The minbar of a mosque was significant not only because it was the only major formal furnishing of the mosque and the symbolic seat of the imam or caliph, but also because it was the setting for the weekly Friday sermon (khutba) which usually mentioned the name of the current Muslim ruler and included other public announcements of a religious or political nature.

The minbar of the Ibrahimi Mosque was originally commissioned in 1091-92 CE (484 AH) for the Shrine of Husayn's Head by Badr al-Jamali, the Fatimid grand vizier under Caliph al-Mustansir. At the time, Badr al-Jamali had just reestablished Fatimid control over the coastal regions of Syria (Lebanon and Palestine) during a 1089 military campaign. Ascalon, one of the southernmost cities along this coast, was a strategic fortress located at the beginning of the road from the Levant to Cairo (the Fatimid capital). It was here that in 1091 the head of Husayn ibn Ali (the Shi'a Imam and grandson of Muhammad, killed in 680) was "miraculously" discovered. This granted the city a new religious significance, especially for the Shi'a Fatimids. Badr ordered the immediate construction of a mashhad (a memorial mosque and shrine), known as the Mashhad Ḥusayn, to house Husayn's head and to serve as the Friday mosque of the city. He commissioned the minbar, by then a standard feature of Friday mosques, for this occasion to serve the new mosque.

Later, in 1153, the head of Husayn was moved by the Fatimids from Ascalon to a new shrine in Cairo (now the al-Hussein Mosque), but Ascalon continued to be visited by pilgrims after this and the minbar remained there. In 1187 Salah ad-Din (Saladin) succeeded in recapturing Jerusalem from Crusaders and securing Muslim (Ayyubid) control over most of the region. However, he judged that Ascalon was too vulnerable to a Crusader counterattack and he worried about its potential use as an enemy bridgehead against the newly recaptured Jerusalem. He therefore decided to demolish the city in 1191 but transferred the Fatimid minbar of al-Husayn's now-empty mashhad to the Ibrahimi Mosque in Hebron, which was also a holy site and was situated at a safer distance from the Crusader threat. The minbar has remained there until the present day.

== Design ==
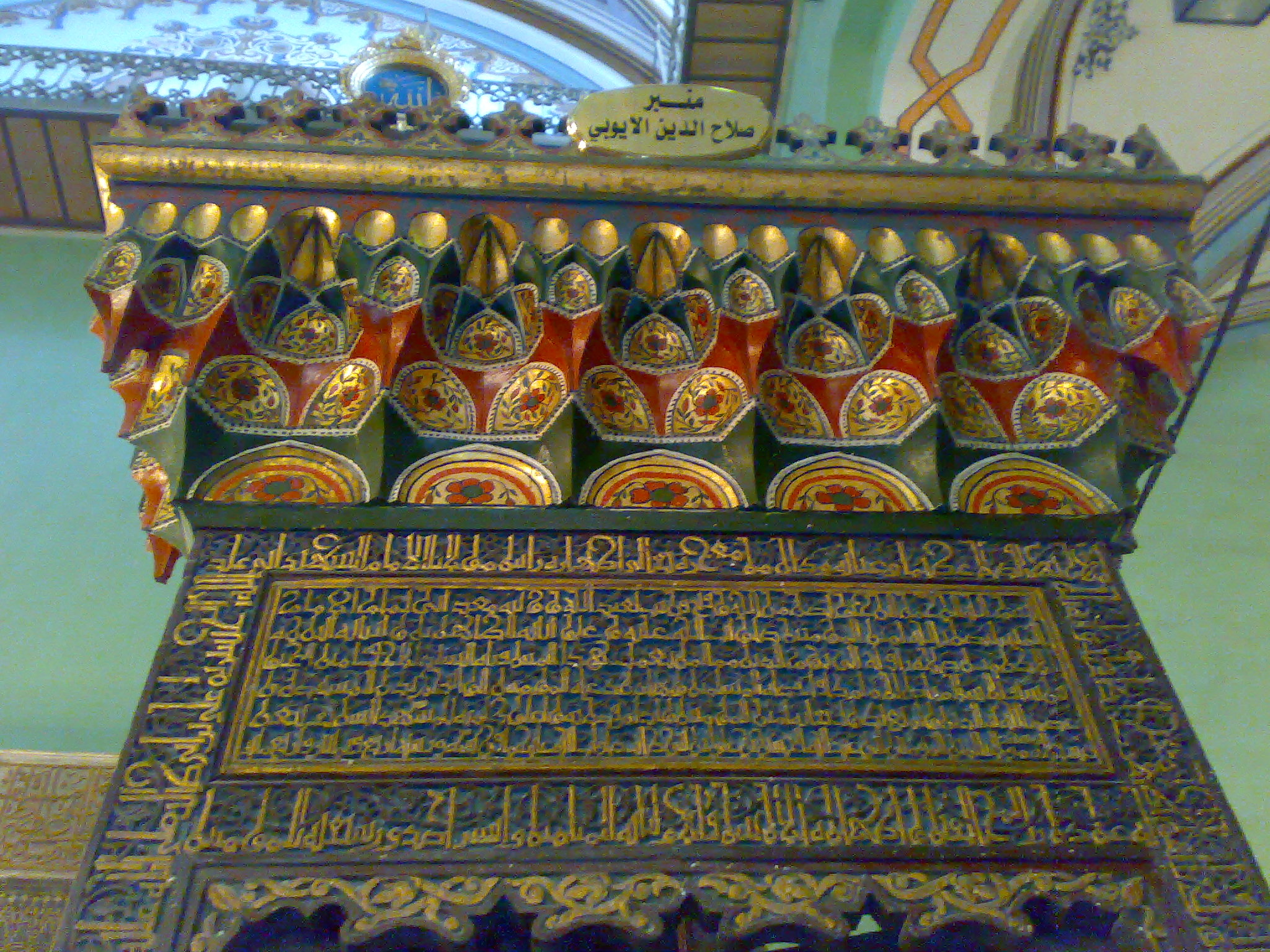
The Kufic Arabic inscription above the doorway of the minbar

The minbar, made of many wood pieces assembled together, is considered a significant piece of Islamic art and one of the most significant historic minbars in the medieval Muslim world. It is also the oldest surviving minbar in this style of woodwork with geometric decoration; a style also seen in the design of the later Minbar of the al-Aqsa Mosque in Jerusalem (which was also a gift from Salah ad-Din).

Like other minbars, it has the form of a staircase with a doorway portal at its bottom and a kiosk with cupola at its summit. Both the top of the portal and the contour of the copula are crowned with gilded muqarnas sculpting. The doors of the minbar consist of two panels covered with carved geometric star patterns. Above the doors is a carved panel with a long Arabic inscription in Kufic script, while another long Kufic inscription runs along the outer frame of the doorway. The portal and the kiosk of the minbar probably date from a later period than the rest of it, perhaps from the Mamluk period.

The flanks of the minbar are covered in a large motif consisting of interlacing strapwork forming a geometric pattern of hexagons and hexagrams, with each piece of the surface carved with intricate arabesques. The inscriptions record the construction of the minbar and of the original Ascalon shrine by Badr al-Jamali on behalf of the Fatimid caliph.

== See also ==
- Minbar of the Kutubiyya Mosque
