= Barzilai Medical Center =

Hospital in Ashkelon, Israel

Barzilai Medical Center: מרכז רפואי ברזילי; مركز برزيلاي الطبي
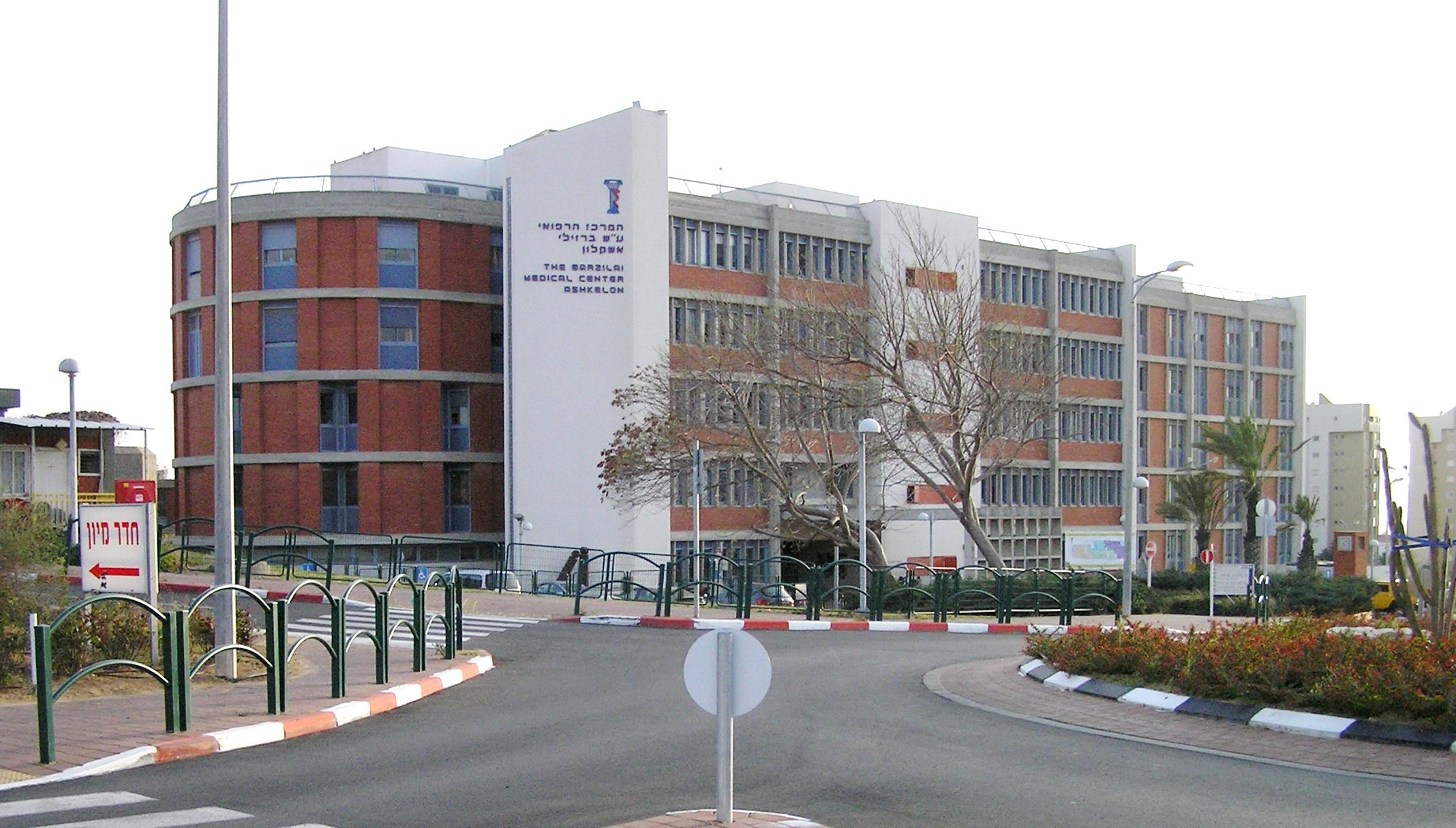
- Barzilai Medical Center

Geography
- Location: Ha-Histadrut, Ashkelon, Israel
- Coordinates: 31°39′43″N 34°33′35″E

Organisation
- Care system: Ministry of Health
- Type: District General, Teaching

Services
- Emergency department: Yes
- Beds: 617

History
- Former name: Ashkelon Hospital
- Opened: July 1961

Links
- Website: bmc.gov.il/eng
- Lists: Hospitals in Israel

Barzilai Medical Center (Hebrew: מרכז רפואי ברזילי, Merkaz Refu'i Barzilai; Arabic: مركز برزيلاي الطبي) is a 600-bed district general hospital in Ashkelon, Israel opened in 1961. The hospital serves a population of 500,000, including a large number of Ethiopian and Russian immigrants, and has more than 100,000 admissions annually.

== History ==
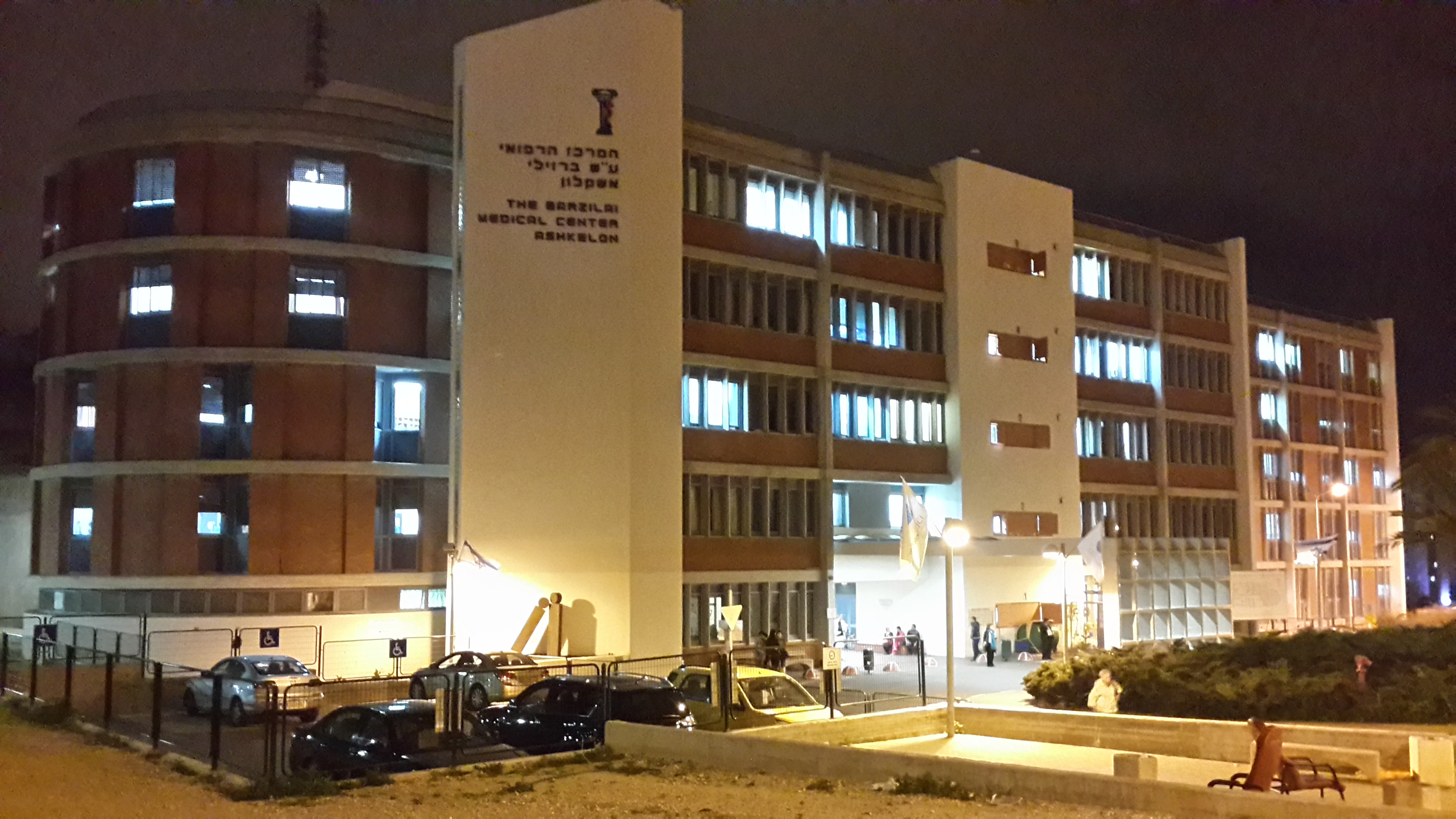
Barzilai Medical Center at night

The Barzilai University Medical Center opened on 20 July 1961, and was initially named Ashkelon Hospital. Construction was financed by the Ministry of Health with the assistance of the South African Zionist Federation, the Ashkelon municipality and Mifal HaPayis. The building was designed by the architect David Brutzkus, covering an area of 8,000m².

The first wards to be established were the pediatric and obstetrics departments, with 15 beds set aside for use by the Israel Defense Force. Dr. Michael Lavih, a medical officer in the air-force, was appointed director of the hospital. From 1961 to 1966, the number of beds rose to 150 and the surgery, internal medicine and orthopedic departments opened. A nursing school was inaugurated in 1966.

In 1971, the hospital was renamed for Minister of Health Yisrael Barzilai, who had laid the cornerstone of the building in the early 1960s. and who had died the previous year.

In 2021, Barzilai Medical Center introduced an innovative treatment for chronic skin wounds that combines plastic surgery and orthopedic rehabilitation. The clinic is open to anyone suffering from chronic ulcers or deep wounds in skin tissue.

== During the Gaza war ==
Situated six miles from Gaza, the hospital has been the target of numerous Qassam and Grad rocket attacks, sometimes as many as 140 in one weekend. The hospital plays a vital role in treating wounded soldiers and terror victims.

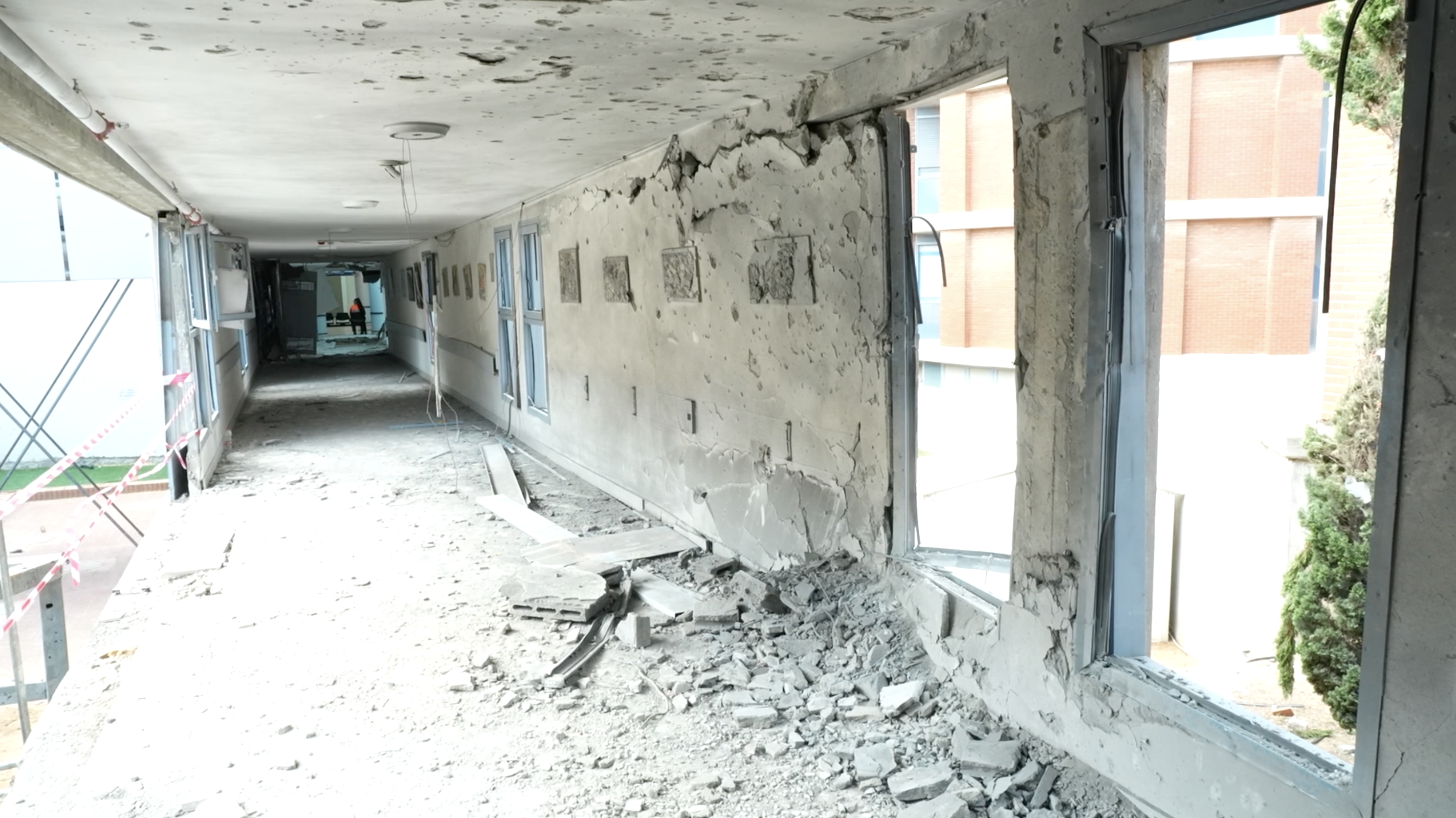
Aftermath of a Hamas rocket hit on the maternity ward of Barzilai Medical Center on 8 October 2023

Plans to build a new rocket and missile-proof emergency room for the hospital in 2010 were hampered by ultra-orthodox protests sparked by the discovery of human remains in an ancient burial ground unearthed during construction activities. The hospital's new fortified emergency room was dedicated on 20 February 2018.

Since the beginning of the Gaza war, Barzilai Medical Center has endured three direct rocket hits. Despite its vulnerable location, the hospital is only partially protected, resulting in a current occupancy rate of just 30%, far below its capacity and need. An underground protected area was built, accommodating 285 beds, but the hospital still struggles with challenges like caring for premature infants and conducting dialysis treatments under these circumstances.

On 8 October 2023, the second day of the conflict, the hospital administration decided to relocate all patients from the women's and high-risk pregnancy departments to a protected underground area. This decision proved crucial, as shortly afterward, a rocket struck close to the evacuated departments. The hospital director Hazi Levi emphasized the importance of this pre-emptive action, especially given the severity of damage evident in the aftermath of the rocket strikes.

== Landmarks ==
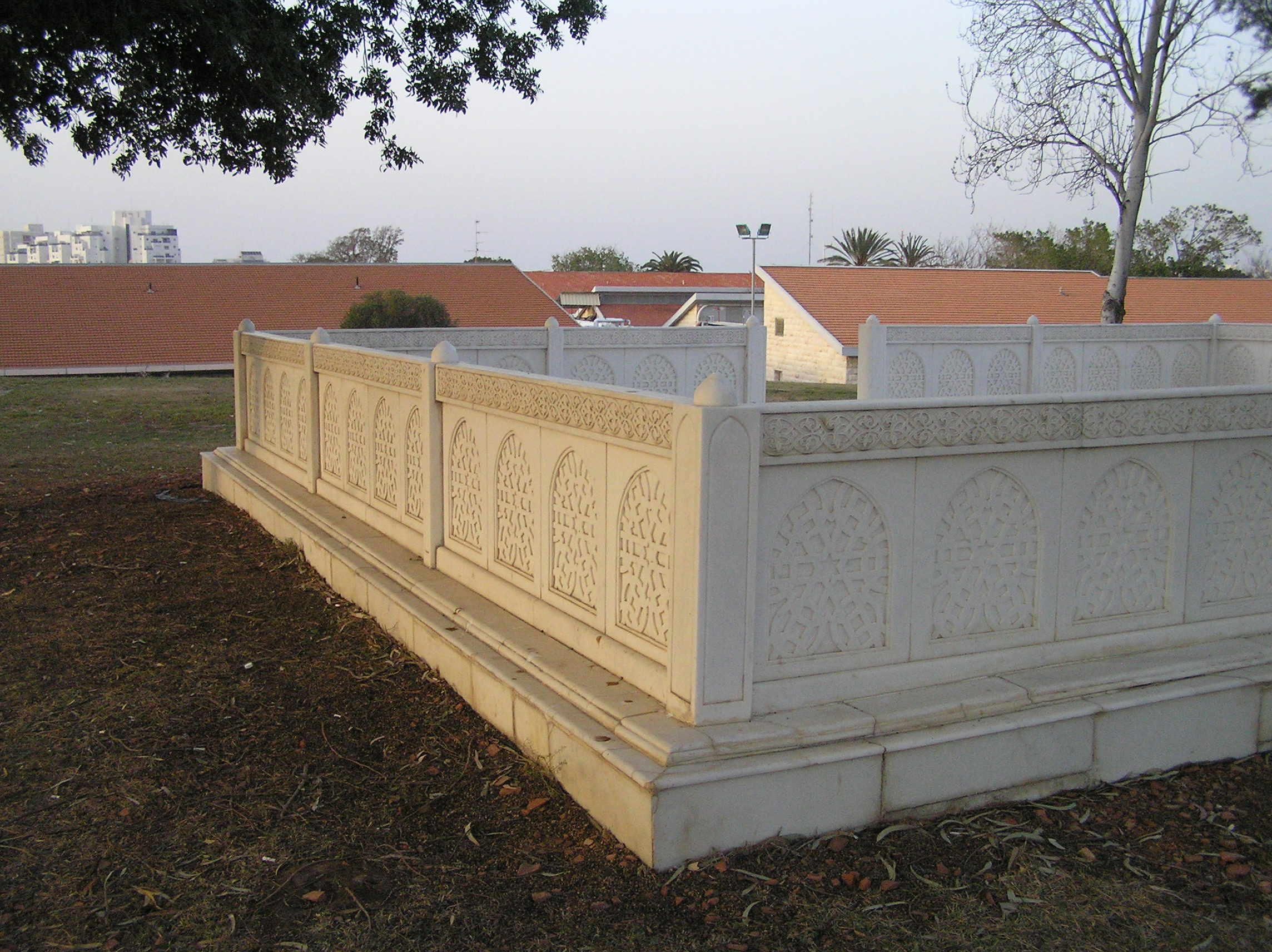
Shrine of Husayn's Head

A section of the grounds of the hospital is believed to have been the burial place of the head of Husayn ibn Ali (Arabic: رَأس ٱلحُسَين, romanized: Rās al-Ḥusayn), a grandson of Muhammad. In the 11th century, Badr al-Jamali built a shrine known as the Shrine of Husayn's Head (Arabic: مشْهد ٱلنَبِي ٱلحُسَين, romanized: Mäšhäď al-Nabī al-Ḥusyan, lit. 'Mausoleum of our Lord Husayn') at the direction of the Fatimid Imam-Caliph, Ma'ad al-Mustansir. The shrine became a pilgrimage site for Shi'a Muslims and historically also Palestinian Sunnis. In July 1950 the multi-story structure was destroyed by Israel Defense Forces under instructions from Moshe Dayan. Around 2000, a marble platform was installed at the site by Mohammed Burhanuddin.

== See also ==
- Health care in Israel
