= Minbar of the al-Aqsa Mosque =

Minbar (pulpit) in the Al-Aqsa Mosque, Jerusalem

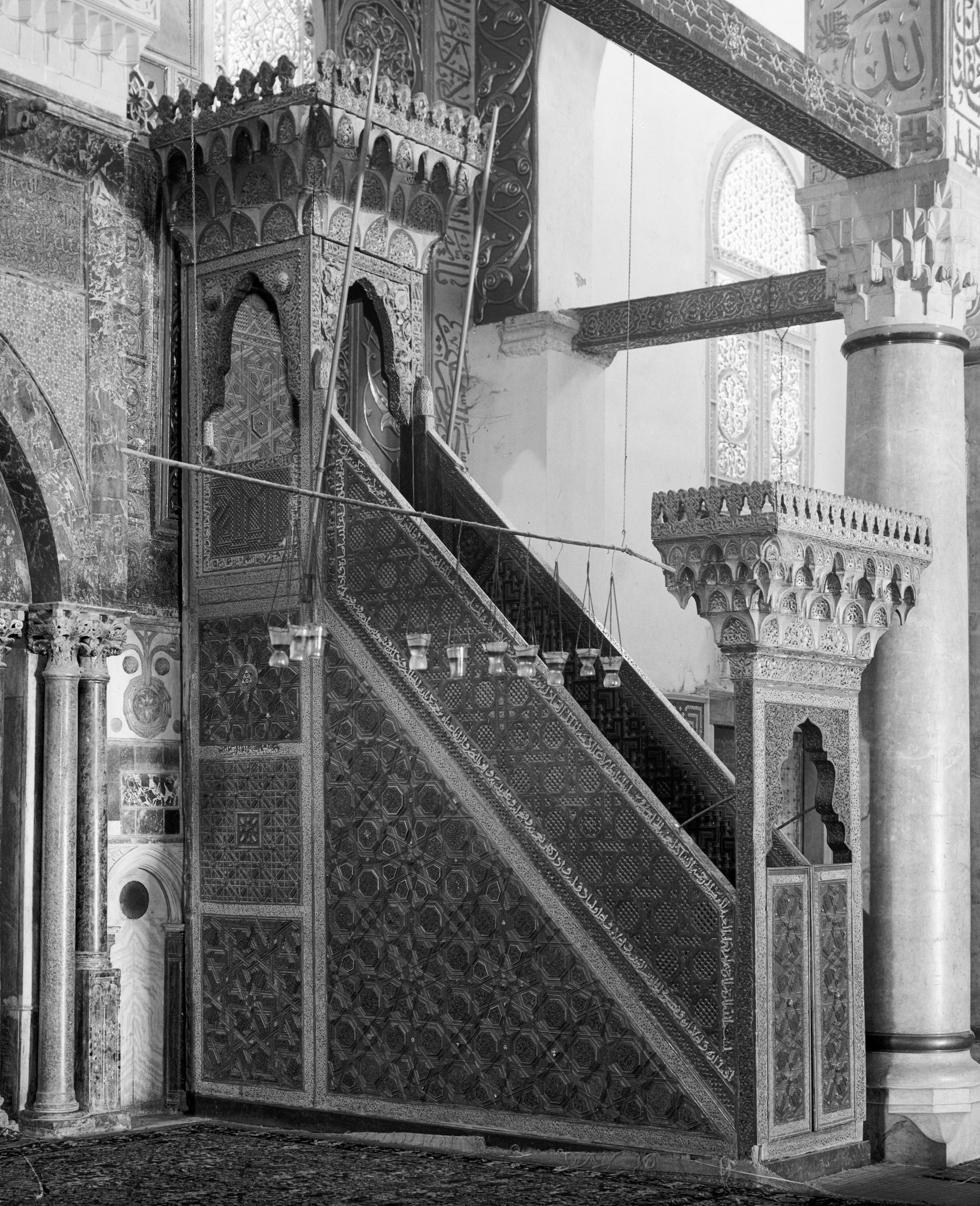
View of the minbar in the 1930s

The Minbar of the al-Aqsa Mosque, also known as the Minbar of Saladin, was a notable historic minbar (pulpit in a mosque) inside the al-Aqsa Mosque in Jerusalem. It was originally commissioned by Nur al-Din in 1168–69 CE in Aleppo, Syria, and was later moved to Jerusalem after the city was conquered in 1187 by Salah ad-Din (Saladin). It was one of the most famous historic minbars of the Muslim world and was considered by scholars to be a highly significant object of medieval Islamic art.

The minbar remained in the mosque until 1969 when it was destroyed by arson. A reconstruction of the minbar created by an international team of experts in Jordan was installed in its place in 2007.

== Historical background ==
Nur al-Din (ruled 1146–1174) started his career as the Atabeg of Aleppo but subsequently conquered Damascus and unified much of Syria under Zengid rule, positioning himself as the main military opponent of the Crusader states. He commissioned the construction of the minbar in 1168-69 (564 AH) in anticipation of recapturing Jerusalem, promising to install it in the al-Aqsa Mosque. This act and promise thus had both religious and political significance, denoting Nur al-Din's role as leader of the Muslim counter-crusade. The minbar of a mosque was itself symbolically significant as it was not only one of the only major formal furnishings of a mosque but it was also the setting for the weekly Friday sermon (khutba), which usually mentioned the name of the current Muslim ruler and included other public announcements of a religious or political nature.

The minbar was manufactured in Aleppo and, once finished, was placed in the Great Mosque of Aleppo until it could be moved to its intended location. It was seen by Ibn Jubayr in 1182, who praised its beauty in his writings. Nur al-Din had also commissioned other minbars in the cities under his control, such as the minbar commissioned for the mosque he founded in Hama (the Nur al-Din Mosque) in 1163–1164.

Nur al-Din died in 1174 before he was able to carry out his plans toward Jerusalem. His nephew, Salah ad-Din (known in the west as Saladin), who had also taken control of Egypt from the Fatimids, succeeded him as sultan. Salah ad-Din eventually realized his uncle's goal of capturing Jerusalem after a siege in 1187. Upon his victory, he moved the minbar to the Al-Aqsa Mosque, where it remained until the 20th century.

== Description ==
The minbar is considered one of the finest examples of woodwork art from medieval Syria, and one of the most significant historic minbars of the Muslim world for both its artistic and symbolic merits. It was made of interlocking pieces of pine wood decorated with inlaid mother-of-pearl, ivory, and ebony. Composed of a total of about 6500 pieces, it was held together without glue or metal nails by using an interlocking technique (ta'shiq) also found in other major works of its kind, aided by wooden nails or pins.

Like other minbars, it took the form of a staircase with a doorway portal at its bottom and a kiosk structure at its summit. The doorway contained an ornate arch of alternating curved and straight lines, surrounded by surfaces carved with intricate arabesques, while the doors themselves consisted of two panels carved with geometric motifs featuring six-pointed stars. Both the top of the portal and the contour of the copula were crowned with gilded muqarnas sculpting. The flanks of the minbar were decorated with several star-shaped and octagonal geometric patterns which were also carried into the balustrades of the stairs, which were made of turned wood or mashrabiyya. The balustrades were in turn framed by a long Arabic inscription in a cursive script. Calligraphic inscriptions are also found in various locations on the sides of the minbar. The inscriptions include Qur'anic verses, a description of its creation by Nur al-Din, and, notably, the signatures of five different craftsmen who created the minbar, including a master craftsman called Al-Akharini.

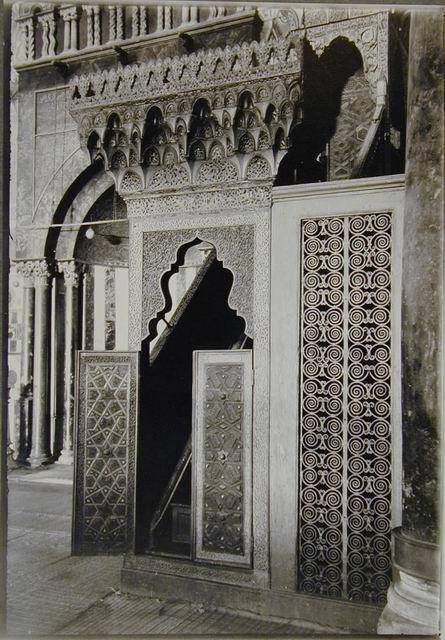
The front portal of the minbar

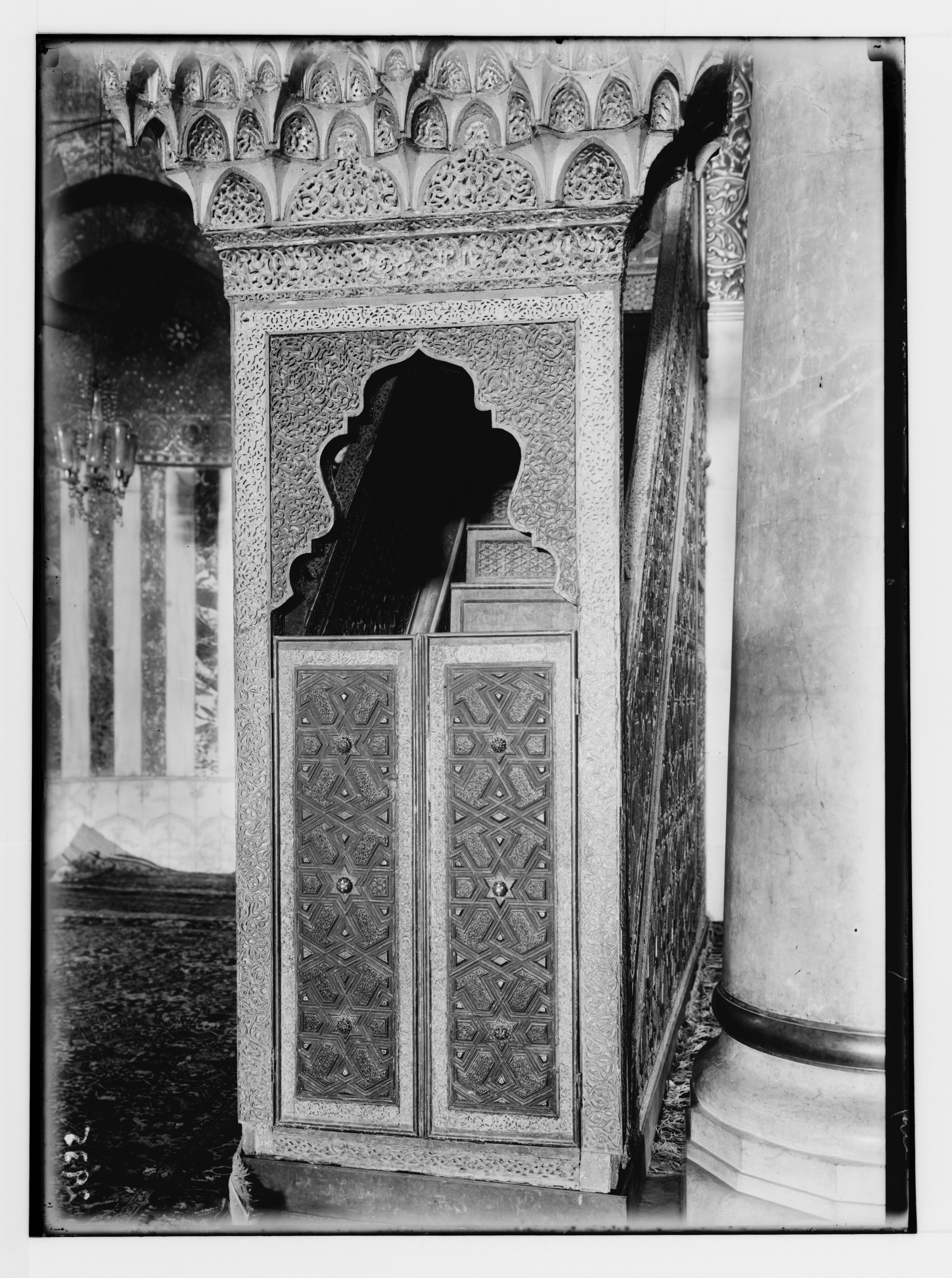
The portal and doors

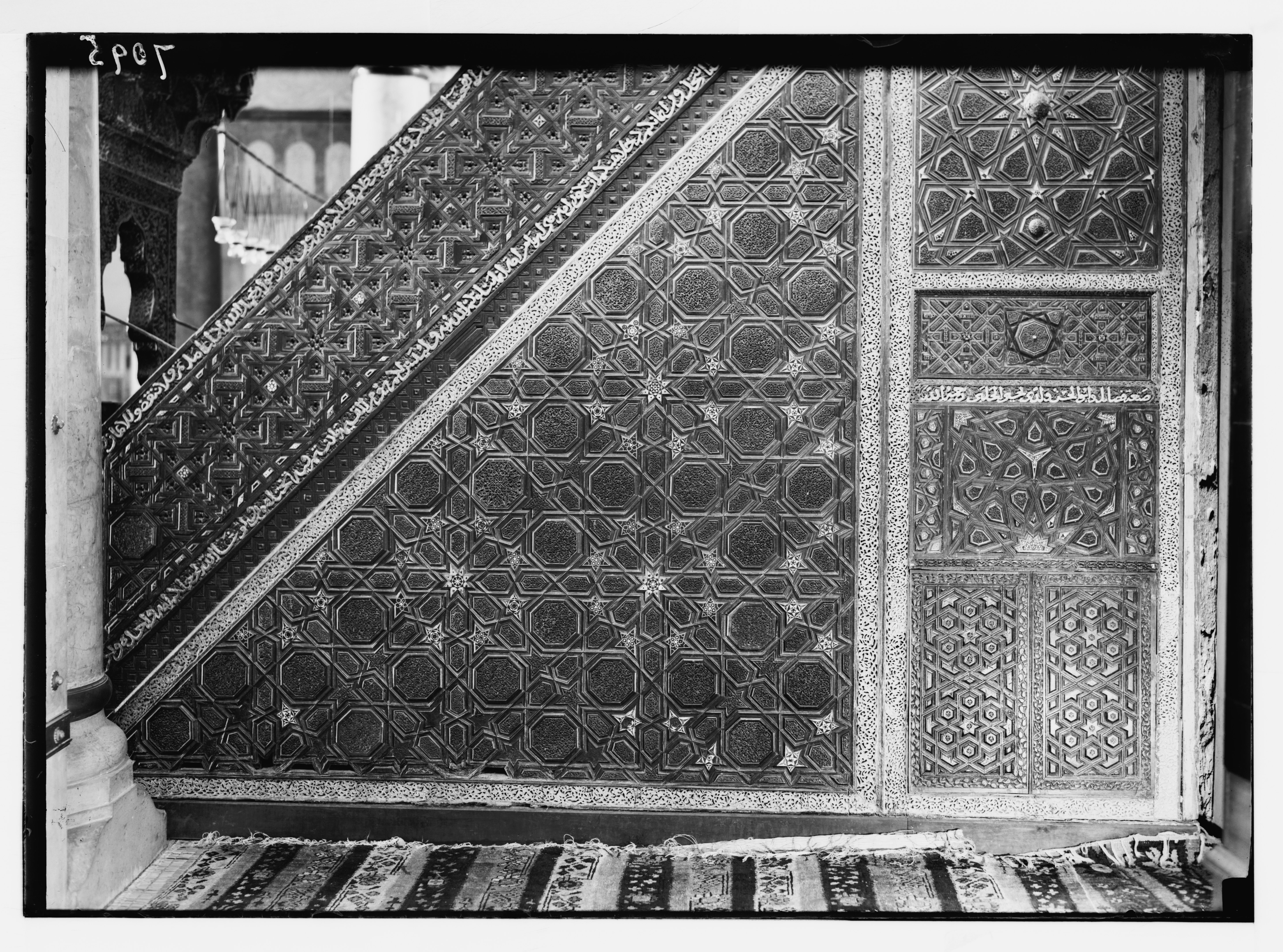
The side of the minbar

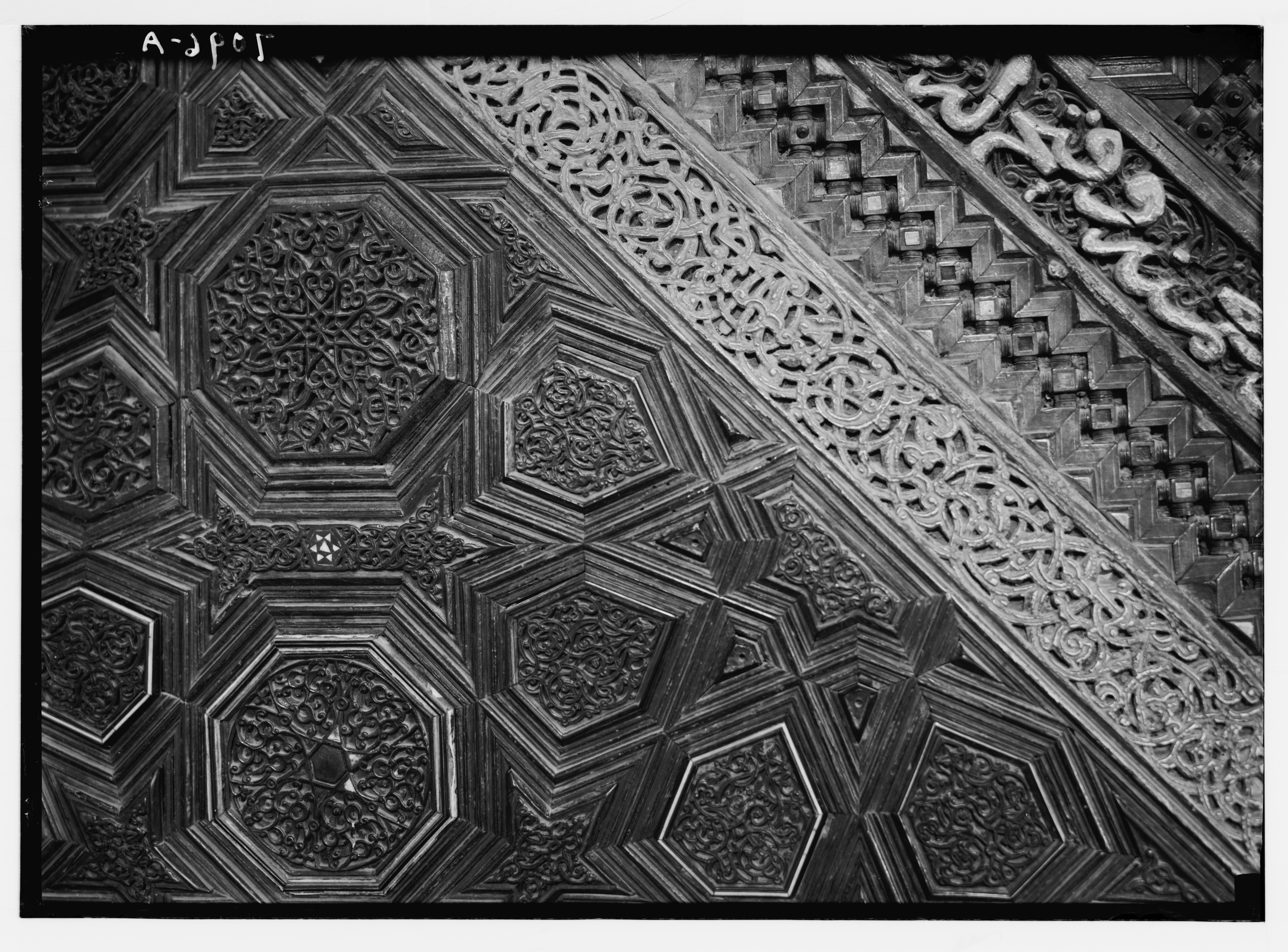
Close-up of the decorative details on the side of the minbar

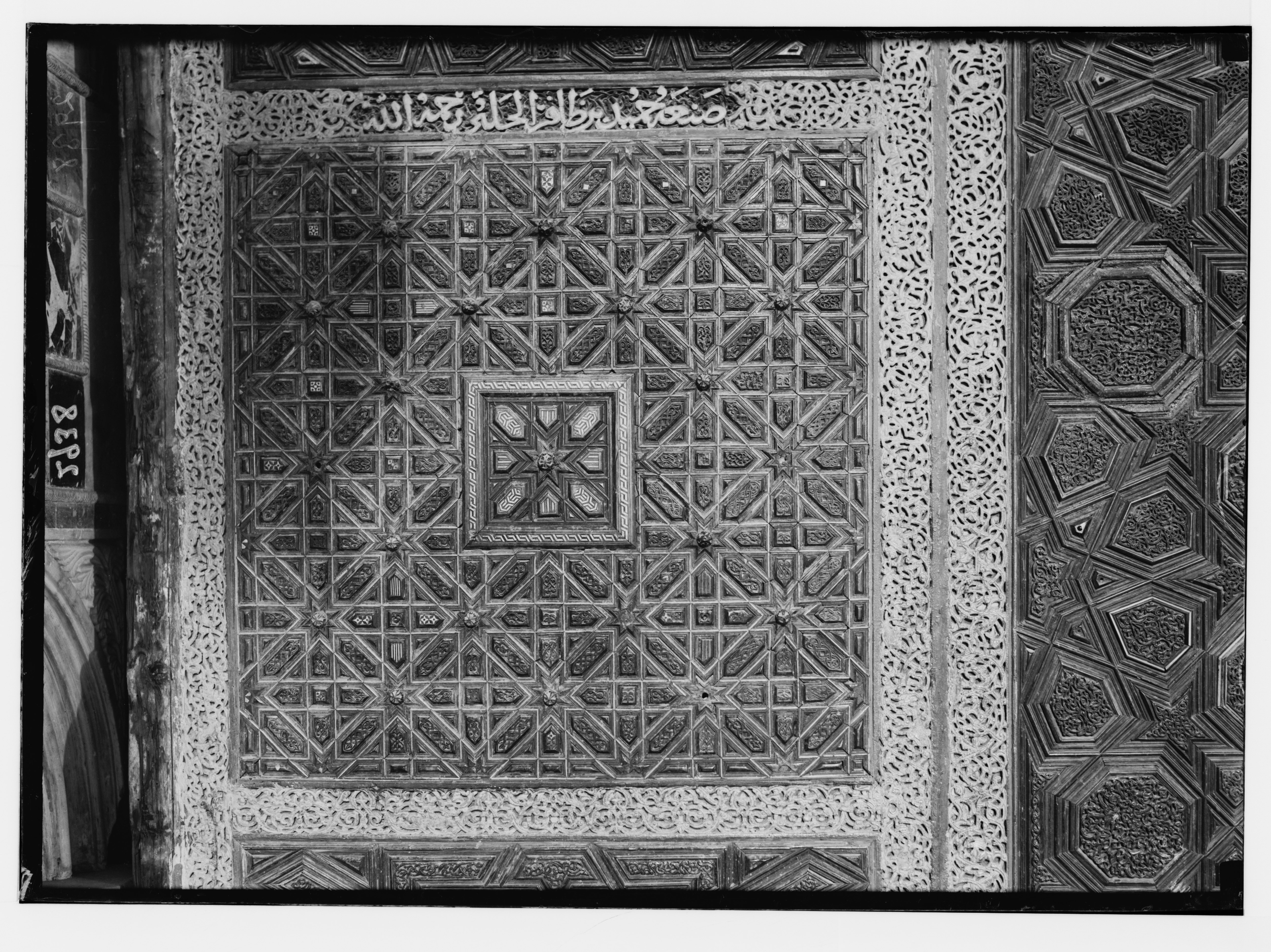
Close-up of the decorative details, with one of the inscriptions containing a craftsman's signature

== Destruction and reconstruction ==
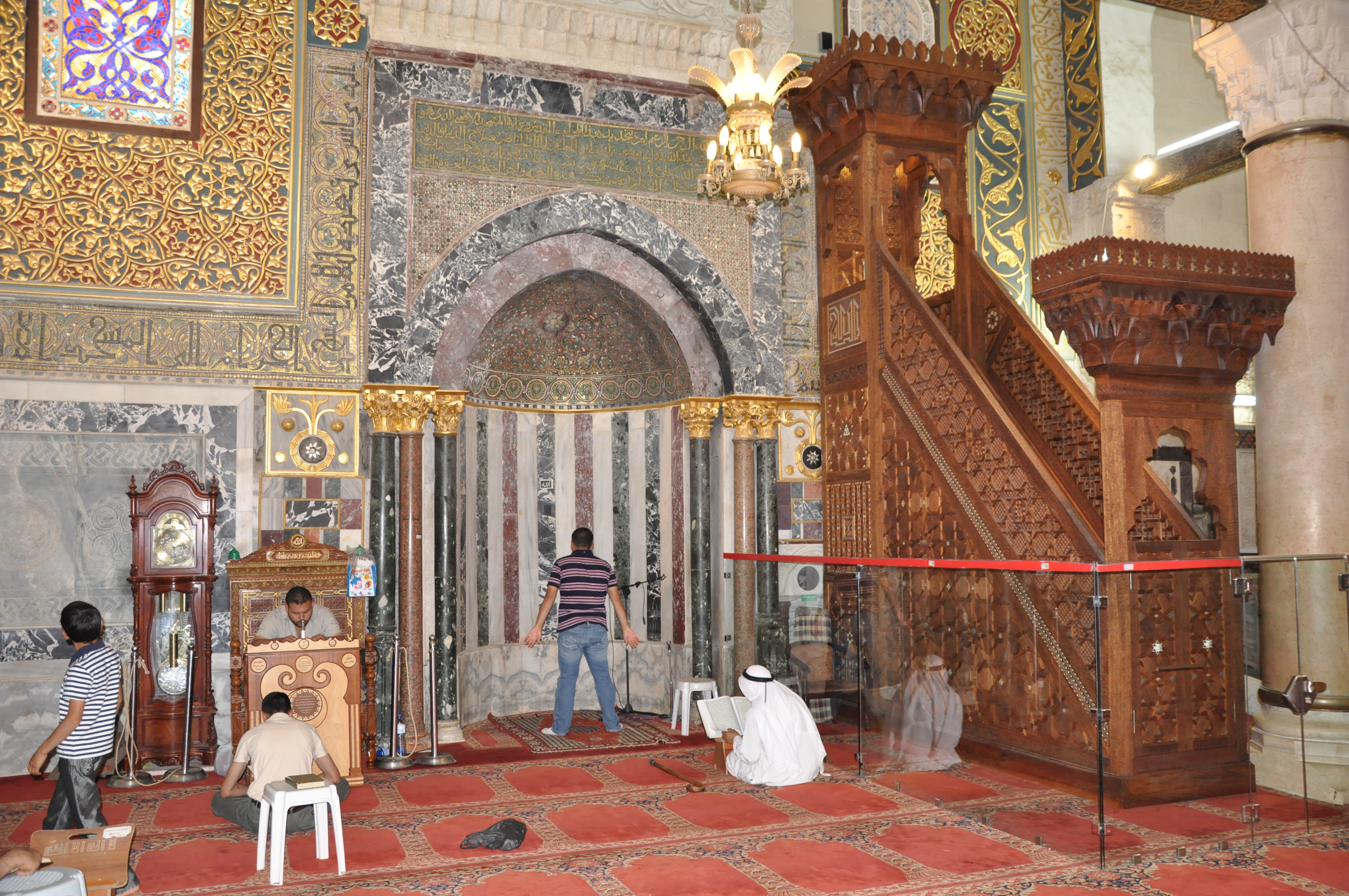
View of the reconstructed minbar (right) in 2009

On August 21, 1969, Michael Rohan, an Australian Christian fundamentalist, entered the mosque and set fire to the pulpit. The resulting blaze destroyed the pulpit and damaged the surrounding area of the mosque, including the historic mihrab. The mosque underwent repairs and restoration over time, but the replacement of the minbar was a more complicated task which was not completed until 2007. The few surviving pieces of the original wooden minbar were moved to the Islamic Museum on the Haram al-Sharif (Temple Mount).

a close-up of the reconstructed minbar in 2022

A "Reconstruction Committee" based in Jordan was charged with reconstructing the minbar. An expert artist from Jerusalem, Jamal Badran al-Maqdisi, was hired to draw life-scale reproductions of the minbar's pieces and its decoration, based on the few surviving pieces of the original minbar, on photographs of the minbar before its destruction, and on comparisons with similar minbars and decorative objects contemporary with the minbar's original creation. A local engineering consultant office, Al-Mihrab for Islamic Architecture, was hired to reproduce the drawings in digital form. A local university in Amman, Al-Balqa Applied University, was charged with implementing the physical reconstruction under the direction of Dr. Mahmoud al-Balbisi. A team of 30 carpenters specialized in various aspects of woodworking were assembled from many different Muslim-majority countries including Turkey, Egypt, Morocco, Syria, Indonesia, and Jordan. The pieces of the minbar were crafted out of walnut wood, like the original. The pieces were then assembled in Amman first in order to compare the overall work with the appearance of the original minbar and to make further calibrations. Once the process was finished, the minbar was disassembled again and shipped in pieces to the al-Aqsa mosque, where it was reassembled on site.

== See also ==
- Minbar of the Ibrahimi Mosque
