= Eva Erben =

Czech-Israeli writer and Holocaust survivor, Holocaust survivor

- Born: Eva Löwidt; 1930 (age 95–96); Děčín
- Known for: Holocaust survivor
- Spouse: Peter Erben
- Children: Three
- Parents: Jindřich Löwidt (father); Marta Löwidt (mother)

Eva Erben (Erbenová) (Hebrew: אווה ארבן; born October 24, 1930 as Eva Löwidt (Löwitová or Löwidtová)) is a Czech-Israeli writer and Holocaust survivor who serves as a witness to history. She gained international recognition with the publication of her book When I Was Missed: Memories of a Jewish Girl, in which she describes the ordeal of her family in concentration camps and on death marches. The book has been translated into several languages.

== Family and Homeland ==
Eva Löwidt (Löwitová or Löwidtová) was born on October 24, 1930 in Děčín, Czechoslovakia, near the German border. Her father, Jindřich (*January 18, 1895), was a chemical engineer, inventor, and owned a rubber factory in Volyně. Her mother, Marta (*July 17, 1901), was a trained office clerk and housewife. Eva's family was a Jewish, assimilated family that did not strictly adhere to Orthodox Jewish practices. At home, they set up a Christmas tree, lit candles for Hanukkah, and celebrated major Jewish holidays. Eva played with both Christian and Jewish friends and attended a German kindergarten. At home, she spoke both German and Czech.

From 1936, the family lived in Prague at the address Prague XIII, V Olšinách 1330. Tragedy struck in 1939 when Eva, while buying ice cream, read a sign in front of the patisserie: "No entry for dogs and Jews." Friends offered Eva the opportunity to emigrate to Great Britain and later to the USA, but she refused as it would have meant leaving her parents behind. In the following years, the situation deteriorated drastically. The family's bank account was frozen, her father was forced out of his company, and assets such as their car, radio, furs, and skis were confiscated by the Gestapo. Even her canary was supposed to be surrendered, but Eva set it free. From the summer of 1939, Jewish children were barred from attending school. Eva, along with other Jewish children, received private lessons from a Jewish teacher who had also been dismissed.

In 1938, her parents' generation asked, "How long can Hitler last?" During the November pogroms of 1938, people wondered how such events could occur in a civilized country, the land of Johann Wolfgang von Goethe.

== Deportations, Shoah and concentration camps ==
=== Deportation to the Theresienstadt Ghetto ===
At the age of eleven, Eva Erben was deported with her family to Theresienstadt at the end of 1941 and then to Auschwitz in 1944. The deportation notice for forced resettlement was delivered just one day prior. Eva could only pack her doll Hanna, some colored pencils, and her diary. She had to wear multiple layers of underwear, stockings, and jackets.

During the march from Bauschowitz station to the Theresienstadt Ghetto, the eleven-year-old Eva suddenly realized:

We children realized that our parents were no longer the strong personalities who organized our lives. All of a sudden, we were grown up. [...] No one could help us anymore. From now on, we would have to take care of ourselves to make things easier for our parents.

—

In 1942, as a twelve-year-old, Eva Erben performed in 55 performances of the children's opera Brundibár in the Theresienstadt Ghetto. Of the Theresienstadt children's theater ensemble, only four children survived; the rest were murdered in Auschwitz. The children's opera gave her the courage to believe that "good will triumph, evil cannot last forever". At 13, she was subjected to forced labor, tasked with tending vegetable beds in the fortress trenches.

Despite the ghetto conditions, Eva Erben later recalled this time with many memories of music, theater, literature, and art, which served as valuable life lessons. The rich cultural life helped her endure the horrific times and harsh conditions (lack of medicine, food, etc.). Older generations did not perceive it this way. For many prisoners, especially children, youths under 18, the elderly, and the sick, the Theresienstadt Ghetto meant certain death in Auschwitz.

In Theresienstadt, Eva Erben encountered Adolf Eichmann, who was responsible for the murder of over 6 million Jews and was sentenced to death in Israel in 1962 for "crimes against the Jewish people," "crimes against humanity", "war crimes", and "membership in a criminal organization". Although living conditions in the "model ghetto" Theresienstadt were better than in other camps, there were harsh punishments, torture, and executions. Within three years, over 30,000 people died. Of the more than 15,000 ghetto children (under 14), most were deported to Auschwitz and killed; only a few survived, including Eva.

=== Auschwitz-Birkenau and Schlesiersee subcamp of Gross-Rosen ===
On 4 October 4, 1944, Eva was deported (Transport Cr, No. 177) to the extermination camp Auschwitz-Birkenau. She was separated from her mother and claimed to be 18 years old (born October 26, 1926). Older mothers and children under 15 were sent directly to the gas chambers. She was in Auschwitz-Birkenau at the same time as the almost equally aged Anne Frank, who died of typhus in Bergen-Belsen in March 1945. The women were forced to dig tank trenches. Those who were too weak or appeared frail were selected and murdered, including by SS camp doctor Josef Mengele. Eva and her mother survived three selections, where they sometimes had to stand naked for hours during roll calls. Of the 2,484 people deported from Theresienstadt to Auschwitz in Transport Cr, No. 177, 2,452 were murdered; only 32 survived until the end of the war. Eva Erben narrowly escaped the fate of the 216,300 deported Jewish children. Only 451 Jewish children under 14 survived Auschwitz; the rest were murdered. Her camp number was A 1673, with the "A" standing for transport Jews.

About six weeks later, she was transferred to the Schlesiersee subcamp, an external work detachment of the Gross-Rosen concentration camp. The so-called operational authority was the Organisation Todt. A memorial by the German-Polish Society for Cooperation commemorates the Schlesiersee subcamp.

=== Death of Eva's father after deportation from Auschwitz to Kaufering subcamp complex ===
Her father, Jindřich, was deported to Auschwitz on September 28, 1944 (Transport Ek, No. 308), and later transferred via one of the so-called evacuation transports from the front-line concentration camp to the Kaufering concentration camp complex. The camp was drastically overcrowded, and prisoners were subjected to murderous detention and labor conditions. Catastrophic living conditions led to a typhus epidemic. On January 24, 1945, Jindřich Löwidt died of typhus in the Kaufering subcamp complex of the Dachau concentration camp. Of the approximately 41,500 people who lost their lives in Dachau and its subcamps between 1933 and 1945, over a third died in the last six months of the war.

== 700 km death marches and rescue ==
=== First death march to Flossenbürg Concentration Camp ===
On January 21, 1945, Eva Erben and her mother Marta were forced onto a death march to the Helmbrechts subcamp of the Flossenbürg concentration camp in Bavaria. The original destination was the Dachau concentration camp. The Death March to Volary lasted 106 days with intermediate stops. Those too exhausted to continue were shot. The prisoners were guarded by the notoriously brutal SS Totenkopf Division. On January 28, 1945, the women from Schlesiersee arrived at the Grünberg forced labor camp northwest of Breslau. One or two days later, the camp was evacuated. On January 31, they reached the Schwedenwall camp in Christianstadt, a labor camp for Jewish women about 40 km southwest of Grünberg. On February 2, 1945, after about two days in Christianstadt, the march continued. Christianstadt was overcrowded with eastern refugees and was completely evacuated due to the advancing Russian army.

On March 6, 1945, 621 Jewish women arrived at the Helmbrechts subcamp; 479 Jewish women did not survive this leg of the march from Schlesiersee. Living conditions in the overcrowded camp deteriorated drastically. All Jewish women from Auschwitz, including Eva and her mother, were malnourished after over 600 km on foot, suffering from frostbite, especially on their feet, and many had intestinal diseases, some even noma. Eva Erben describes her traumatic experiences in her autobiographical book:

We covered thirty to forty kilometers daily. At night, we slept in freezing cold under the open sky. We lived on scraps, grasses, and twigs we found by the roadside. We quenched our thirst with snow. The only meal of the day was in the evening: a watery soup and a slice of bread.

=== Second death march and death of her mother ===
From the Helmbrechts subcamp, a new death march began on April 13, 1945, due to the approaching American army (15 km away), initially heading east toward Svatava, but it was rerouted to Volary in South Bohemia due to advancing Russian troops. The Langer Gang Memorial commemorates this death march. This final death march was halted by the Americans in Volary on May 4, 1945. About 200 women died of exhaustion or were murdered during this last march (including Eva's mother). Of the approximately 1,000 women from the Schlesiersee subcamp of Gross-Rosen and the approximately 300 prisoners from the Grünberg subcamp, about 350 survived.

Her mother, Marta, died completely exhausted in a night camp during this final death march on April 17, 1945, in the Svatava subcamp of the Flossenbürg concentration camp. Her last words were:

'I'm sorry, Eva. I have to leave you, I can't go on...', she kissed me and looked at me with eyes that stared into death.

—

After her mother's death, which she could not accept, Eva was devastated, near death, apathetic, weighing only 28 kilos, and barely able to eat or walk. Looking back, Eva Erben described the death march as "the worst of the worst, truly a hell".

=== Escape and near death ===
Eva Erben managed to escape during the final leg of the death march to Volary. She slept in hay warmed by a cow in a barn during the march, unnoticed by guard dogs and forgotten by the SS. A Polish forced laborer found her, gave her food and drink, and advised her to leave as the farm belonged to a German farmer. She continued alone for a few days, creating a grave for her mother near a railway line. There, she met a deserted young soldier (around April 20, 1945), who shared bread and coffee with her and told her the war was nearly over. Later, she encountered a group of youths who told her she could find help in a nearby Czech village. Physically so weak that she could not keep up with them, she sometimes had to crawl on all fours.

Near the village, she was nearly shot by a guard soldier with a loaded rifle but escaped death when a second soldier said, "Let her go, she'll die on her own. It's a waste of a bullet."

=== Rescue by the Jahn family ===
Farmer Kryštof Jahn and his wife Ludmila found the unconscious Eva Löwidt around April 20, 1945 (parents of one of the youths) near their village Postřekov and took her into their home. On a midwife's orders, she was given mother's milk for a week to regain strength. The doctor examining the liberated Jewish women from this death march described their condition: "At first glance, the sight of these people shocked me deeply. I could never have imagined that someone could be so starved and emaciated and still live under these conditions."

Until the end of the war, she was hidden under the kitchen floor by the Jahn family. They cared for her lovingly; for the first time in years, Eva slept in a proper bed and had enough warm food. In the evenings, she could come out of hiding and spend time with the family. They treated her like their own daughter, and Eva called her rescuers Uncle Jahn and Aunt Ludmila. Since the Christian Jahn family and the village were deeply religious (Catholic), Eva had to pray the rosary and attend church for a time, recalling rituals from her Catholic housemaid. She adopted the non-Jewish surname Karel. In the family, Eva said, the living God resided. She revealed her Jewish identity only after the war ended, though the host family had already suspected or known. Her new name was Eva Jahn. Parting from her new Jahn family was very difficult for Eva.

In 1966, Eva Erben, with her family, visited her rescuers unannounced during a trip to Europe, having had no prior contact. Her husband Peter, their children, and Eva herself learned the full story of her rescue and the dramatic circumstances from Uncle Jahn for the first time. For 21 years, Eva could not speak about it. The reunion was spontaneously celebrated with the entire village community the next day. Eva Erben later became an honorary citizen of the Postřekov community.

=== Jahn couple – Righteous Among the Nations ===
Her rescuers from Possigkau, Kryštof and Ludmila Jahn, were awarded the Righteous Among the Nations title by Israel's Yad Vashem in 1983. The descendants of the family still live in the house and maintain a friendly connection with Eva Erben.

Eva Erben expresses her gratitude with the following words:

Kryštof and Ludmila Jahn not only saved me physically by caring for me and hiding me from the Germans but also spiritually with their boundless love and advanced knowledge. Today, I feel I owe them my life.

=== Investigations into the death march from Schlesiersee to Volary ===
The mass murders of the approximately 100 death marches during the Nazi era were long suppressed. Between autumn 1944 and May 1945, about 250,000 people were "murdered – shot, beaten, burned in barns; people starved or died of exhaustion or disease." No concentration camp prisoner was to be found alive by the Allied liberators, per Heinrich Himmler's orders. The death marches gained international attention through Daniel J. Goldhagen's publication Hitler's Willing Executioners, which dedicated two chapters to the death marches. Arno Lustiger highlighted the lack of historical reckoning with the death marches of concentration camp prisoners in his speech on the Holocaust Remembrance Day at the German Bundestag on January 27, 2005, noting that hundreds of thousands of prisoners fell victim on the roads of the German Reich. Since 2005, research has improved, with a first monograph published in 2011. The historical investigation of Eva Erben's death march was conducted by local historian Hans Brenner, who meticulously reconstructed the route of the Death March to Volary through archival work.

=== Death marches as crimes against humanity ===
Martin C. Winter, in his book Violence and Memory in Rural Areas: The German Population and the Death Marches, examined the so-called wandering concentration camps. The legal reckoning with the death marches, according to Winter, is a "history of failure", as "the number of perpetrators, accomplices, and supporters held accountable was remarkably small and in no proportion to the scale of the atrocities committed". The death march to Volary, during which Eva Erben, her mother, and 1,300 Jewish camp prisoners endured martyrdom, and numerous crimes against humanity were committed in barbaric ways, with nearly 1,000 Jewish women murdered or dying, was only partially prosecuted. In 1947, American judicial authorities investigated the Helmbrechts subcamp without pressing charges; camp commander Alois Dörr was sentenced to life imprisonment in 1969.

== New life and educational work ==
=== Israel ===
After a brief stay with an aunt in East Bohemia, Eva returned to Prague after fifth grade, where she was taken in by a Jewish orphanage. She trained as a nurse, though she had wanted to become a doctor or actress. Despite coming from a wealthy family, she was penniless at the time. In Prague, she fell in love with Peter Erben (Erbenová), a former youth leader from Theresienstadt whom she already knew. Eva and Peter became a couple. At 17, she became pregnant, and on October 31, 1948, they married in Paris. After the founding of Israel, the idea of emigrating to Israel instead of Australia, for which she had a visa, took shape. With a foreign entry visa from the Guatemalan consul for Peter (pro forma), she, as the sole survivor of her family, emigrated with her husband Peter to Israel in 1949. Her family lives in Ashkelon, where she built a new life and worked for many years as a nurse, also caring for Arabs from Gaza. Her husband established a construction company.

=== Processing her Shoah ===
It was not until 35 years later that she began to confront her persecution history. On Israel's Holocaust Remembrance Day in 1979, Eva was to share her experiences with her son Amir's school class. Until then, no one had been interested in her story, partly because many did not believe it and there was also suppression of the horrific events. At her adult children's request, Eva wrote her experiences into a book. This resulted in a Hebrew children's book, now available in many languages, first published in 1981. In German, it is titled When I Was Missed.

=== Educational Work and Large-Scale Events Against Antisemitism ===
Despite her advanced age, Eva Erben continues to share her story of suffering, the Shoah, her rescue, and how she found new strength for life in numerous events, schools, newspaper articles, interviews, and films as a witness to history, especially for children and youths. Typically, 1,000 to 5,000 students aged 14 to 19 attend large-scale events with Eva Erben, such as the recent one in Friedrichshafen with 1,500 students.

=== Lessons from the Nazi era ===
Her message, drawn from her experiences of death, the inhumanity of the Nazi regime, and Auschwitz, particularly to young people, is: The younger generation should recognize their responsibility for the future, understand that life is a great gift to be valued, overcome all hatred, and shape coexistence—whether in Israel with Arabs or worldwide—with love and understanding.

Her message to students:

You must choose the democratic and humanistic path

== Family and other information ==
Eva and Peter had three children, nine grandchildren, and 15 great-grandchildren. They were married for nearly 70 years. Peter Erben died on April 5, 2017.She holds both Israeli and Czech citizenship. She has been friends with the moderator Günther Jauch for years. Her husband, Peter Erben, published his memoirs in 2001 in the book On My Own Tracks.

For 40 years, Eva Erben did not speak German, wanting to erase Germany from her life. "The ice was broken by two German students" whom her husband Peter brought home nearly dying of thirst (posing as a Swede), who wanted to learn more about her life.

Following the Hamas terrorist attack on Israel in October 2023, she briefly fled to her former hometown of Prague in the Czech Republic, returning to Israel in early 2024.

On the evening of April 23, 2025, Eva Erben spoke at the National Day of Remembrance (Yom HaShoah) at the state ceremony at the Yad Vashem memorial in Jerusalem. The motto for 2025 was: "From the depths: the agony of liberation and a new beginning" - in reference to the 80th year of the liberation of the Nazi camps at the end of the Second World War.

In May 2025, Eva Erben was awarded the Federal Cross of Merit 1st Class for her decades-long commitment to peace and humanity. The award was presented by the German Ambassador to Israel Steffen Seibert in the presence of her family.

== Honors ==
- Honorary Citizen of Postřekov, the community of her rescue
- Recipient of the 1st Class Medal of Merit (Czech Republic)
- Gratias Agit Award 2023 from the Czech Republic's Ministry of Foreign Affairs
- Order of Merit of the Federal Republic of Germany - Officer's Cross of the Order of Merit (Verdienstkreuz 1. Klasse, Cross of Merit 1st Class) 2025

== Works, films and documentaries ==
=== Works ===
- Man hat mich vergessen . Erinnerungen eines jüdischen Mädchens(engl."When I Was Missed: Memories of a Jewish Girl). German first edition. Beltz & Gelberg, Weinheim, 1996. (Children's and young adult book edition)
- Fluchten: How a Young Girl Survived the Holocaust. Eds. Daniel Baranowski and Uwe Neumärker: Stiftung Denkmal für die ermordeten Juden Europas, 2014. (Expanded autobiography including historical documentation)
- Escape Story: How a Young Girl Survived the Holocaust. Sharron Publishing Services, 2011.
- and Kummerow, Nadja (author): When I Was Missed, in the Classroom: Teacher's Guide to Eva Erben's Report (Grades 5–8). 2007

=== Films with and about Eva Erben ===
(mostly in German)

- Speech by Eva Erben - Live Broadcast of Holocaust Remembrance Day 2025 Opening Ceremony at Yad Vashem, Min 1:26
- Stern TV: Holocaust Survivor Eva Erben: "Three Weeks in Auschwitz Were Enough for a Lifetime". November 13, 2024
- Stern TV: Survived Two Concentration Camps: The Moving Story of Eva Erben | stern TV Talk with Günther Jauch and Eva Erben. November 13, 2024
- phoenix: Century Witnesses: Eva Erben. January 19, 2024
- bibel TV: Remembrance Day January 27, 2024. Conversation with Eva Erben and Günther Jauch
- Exhibition "Operation Finale" - Witness Conversation with Eva Erben
- Babylon: Eva Erbenová in Czech with Peter Erben
- houseboatfilms: Eva Erbenova, Surviving a Death March. 2007
- 37 Grad (ZDF) - 2020: How Eva Erben Survived the Holocaust
- ICEJ Deutschland: She Survived Auschwitz: Survivor Eva Erben Remembers. 2021
- Film Zeitzeugen. D/IL 2011, Interviewers: Barbara Kurowska, Daniel Baranowski, 189 min

Documentaries and Literature

- Bavarian State Agency for Political Education. In Conversation with Holocaust Survivor Eva Erben
- Brenner, Hans. Death Marches and Death Transports. Gross-Rosen Concentration Camp and its Subcamps, Chemnitz 2015
- Dobra, Felicitas. "Growing Up and Surviving in the Holocaust: Memoirs of Children and Adolescents Part." 山口大学独仏文学 (2005): 17-44.
- Gesellschaft Adolf Rosenberger gGmbH: Adolf Eichmann – How to Catch a Nazi, Munich
- Erben, Eva. "Le dernier mot, inventaire. Récit de l'alyah d'une rescapée des camps de Theresienstadt et Auschwitz." Tsafon. Revue d'études juives du Nord 77 (2019): 143-164.
- Rudorff, Andrea. Women in the Subcamps of the Gross-Rosen Concentration Camp, Berlin 2014
- Rudorff, Andrea. The Schlesiersee I and II Camps. Subcamps of the Gross-Rosen Concentration Camp, Dresden 2021.
- Stiftung Denkmal für die ermordeten Juden Europas - Persecution of Youth under National Socialism – An Online Exhibition
- Yanovsky, Sara O. M. "Remembering Theresienstadt: Oral History, Memory, and the Children of Theresienstadt." Theresienstadt–Film Fragments and Survivor Testimonies: Historiography and Sociological Analyses (2021): 241-265.
- Weblinks
- Before 1,500 Students: Holocaust Survivor Eva Erben Shares Her Life in Friedrichshafen. SWR, November 14, 2024
- The Death March from Schlesiersee to Volary. Yad Vashem – International Holocaust Remembrance Center
- Schlesiersee Memorial. German-Polish Society for Cooperation e.V., Saxony
