= Al-Khisas, Gaza =

al-Khisas خربة الخِصاص Khirbat al-Khiṣāṣ
- Village
- Etymology: the ruin of booths or reed huts
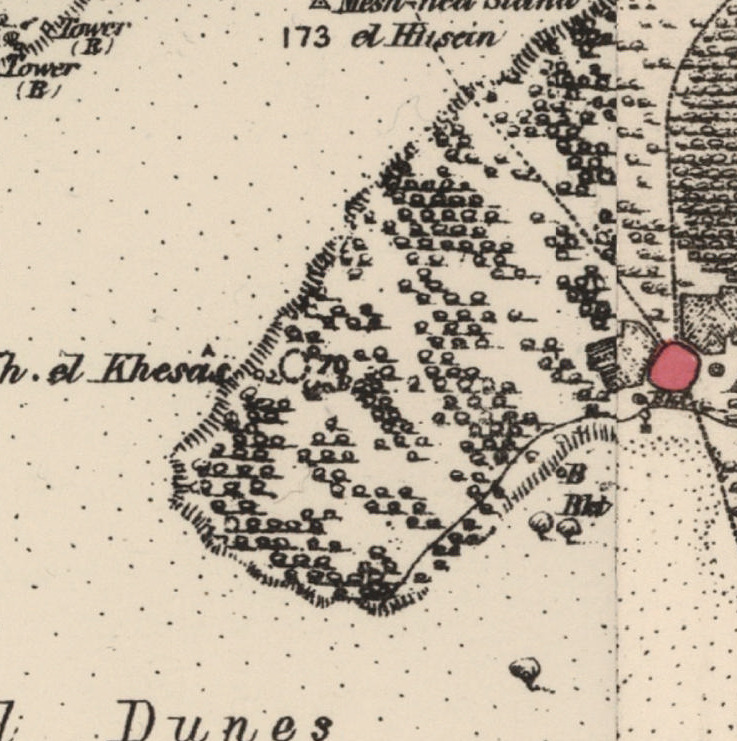
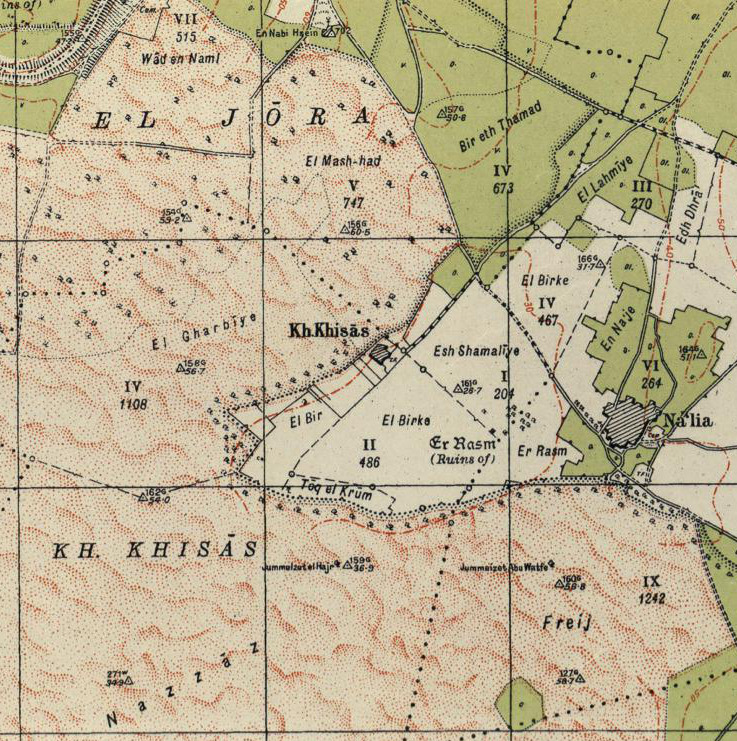
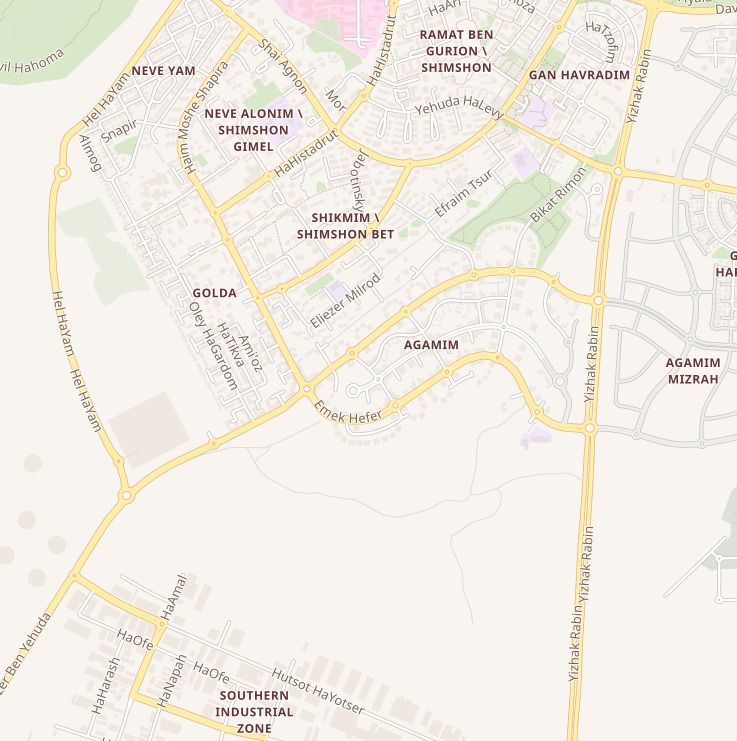
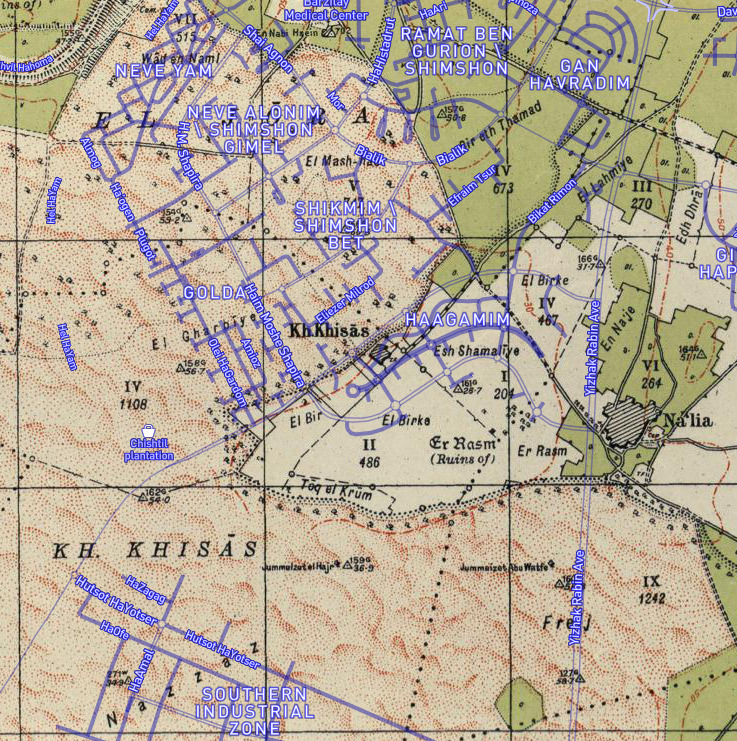
- 1870s map 1940s map modern map 1940s with modern overlay map A series of historical maps of the area around Al-Khisas, Gaza (click the buttons)

- Location within Mandatory Palestine
- Coordinates: 31°38′53″N 34°33′40″E
- Palestine grid: 108/117
- Geopolitical entity: Mandatory Palestine
- Subdistrict: Gaza
- Date of depopulation: November 4–5, 1948

Area
  - Total: 6,269 dunams (6.269 km^{2}; 2.420 sq mi)

Population (1945)
  - Total: 150
- Cause(s) of depopulation: Military assault by Yishuv forces
- Current Localities: Ashkelon

Al-Khisas (Arabic: خربة الخِصاص, Khirbat al-Khiṣāṣ) was a Palestinian Arab village in Palestine, located 18.5 kilometers (11.5 mi) northeast of Gaza near the modern city of Ashkelon.

== Location ==
Al-Khisas was located just west of Ni'ilya, south of Al-Jura.

Al-Khisas, called Khisas, was inhabited in the 15th century. Mamluk records show that in 1459 CE it was endowed was a waqf.

== History ==
=== Late Ottoman period ===
In 1838, in the late Ottoman era, el Khusas was noted as a place "in ruins or deserted", located in the Gaza district.

An official Ottoman village list from about 1870 showed that Chasas had 6 houses and a population of 35, though the population count included men, only.

In 1883, the PEF's Survey of Western Palestine found at Khurbet el Khesas "a few heaps of stones with a well near".

=== British Mandate period ===
The modern village was classified as a hamlet in the Palestine Index Gazetter, and was built after World War I. Farmers from neighboring areas first built temporary huts at the site to shelter themselves during the harvest, gradually they settled and built adobe houses. The population relied on neighboring villages Al-Jura and Ni'ilya for medical, educational and administrative services.

In the 1922 census of Palestine, conducted by the British Mandate authorities, Khesas had a population of 102 inhabitants, all Muslims, increasing in the 1931 census to 133, still all Muslims, in 26 houses.

In the 1945 statistics, Al-Khisas had a population of 150 Muslims with a total of 6,269 dunams of land, according to an official land and population survey. Of this, 191 dunums of village land were used for citrus and bananas, 419 for cereal farming, 2,671 irrigated or used for orchards, while 10 dunams were built-up land.

=== 1948 war; State of Israel ===
The village was depopulated during the 1948 Arab-Israeli War between November 4–5, 1948, at the end of Operation Yo'av. The Israeli army found about 150 people in Al-Khisas and nearby Ni'ilya; they were all expelled to Beit Hanoun on the Gaza strip.

In 1949, S. Yizhar, a member of the Givati Brigade that expelled Al-Khisas inhabitants, published the best selling novella Khirbet Khizeh as a fictional tale. In 1978, his commander identified the village in the story as Al-Khisas.

In 1992 the village site was described as being "engulfed by the Israeli town of Ashkelon".

== Bibliography ==
- Barron, J. B., ed. (1923). Palestine: Report and General Abstracts of the Census of 1922. Government of Palestine.
- Conder, C.R.; Kitchener, H. H. (1883). The Survey of Western Palestine: Memoirs of the Topography, Orography, Hydrography, and Archaeology. Vol. 3. London: Committee of the Palestine Exploration Fund.
- Department of Statistics (1945). Village Statistics, April, 1945. Government of Palestine.
- Hadawi, S. (1970). Village Statistics of 1945: A Classification of Land and Area ownership in Palestine. Palestine Liberation Organization Research Center. Archived from the original on 2018-12-08.
- Hartmann, M. (1883). "Die Ortschaftenliste des Liwa Jerusalem in dem türkischen Staatskalender für Syrien auf das Jahr 1288 der Flucht (1871)". Zeitschrift des Deutschen Palästina-Vereins. 6: 102–149.
- Khalidi, W. (1992). All That Remains: The Palestinian Villages Occupied and Depopulated by Israel in 1948. Washington D.C.: Institute for Palestine Studies. ISBN 0-88728-224-5.
- Mills, E., ed. (1932). Census of Palestine 1931. Population of Villages, Towns and Administrative Areas. Jerusalem: Government of Palestine.
- Morris, B. (2004). The Birth of the Palestinian Refugee Problem Revisited. Cambridge University Press. ISBN 978-0-521-00967-6.
- Palmer, E. H. (1881). The Survey of Western Palestine: Arabic and English Name Lists Collected During the Survey by Lieutenants Conder and Kitchener, R. E. Transliterated and Explained by E.H. Palmer. Committee of the Palestine Exploration Fund.
- Robinson, E.; Smith, E. (1841). Biblical Researches in Palestine, Mount Sinai and Arabia Petraea: A Journal of Travels in the year 1838. Vol. 3. Boston: Crocker & Brewster.
- Socin, A. (1879). "Alphabetisches Verzeichniss von Ortschaften des Paschalik Jerusalem". Zeitschrift des Deutschen Palästina-Vereins. 2: 135–163.
