= Ashkelon =

City in Israel

Coordinates: 31°40′N 34°34′E

Ashkelon אשקלון (Hebrew) عسقلان (Arabic)
- City

Hebrew transcription(s)
  - ISO 259: ʔašqlon
  - Translit.: Ashkelon
  - Also spelled: Ashqelon, Ascalon (unofficial)
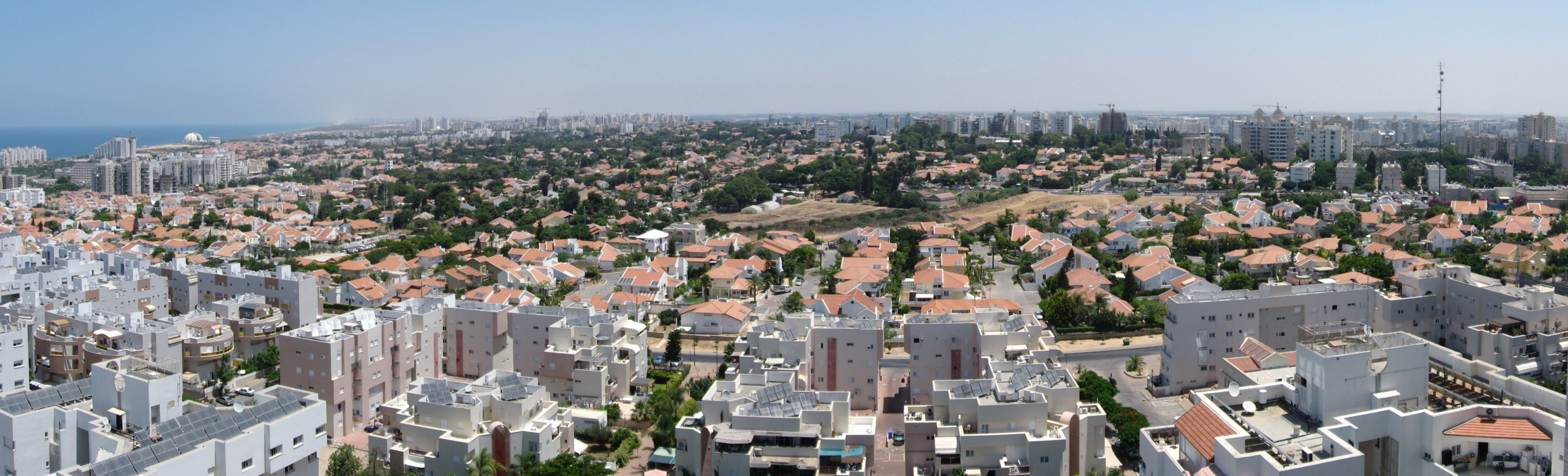
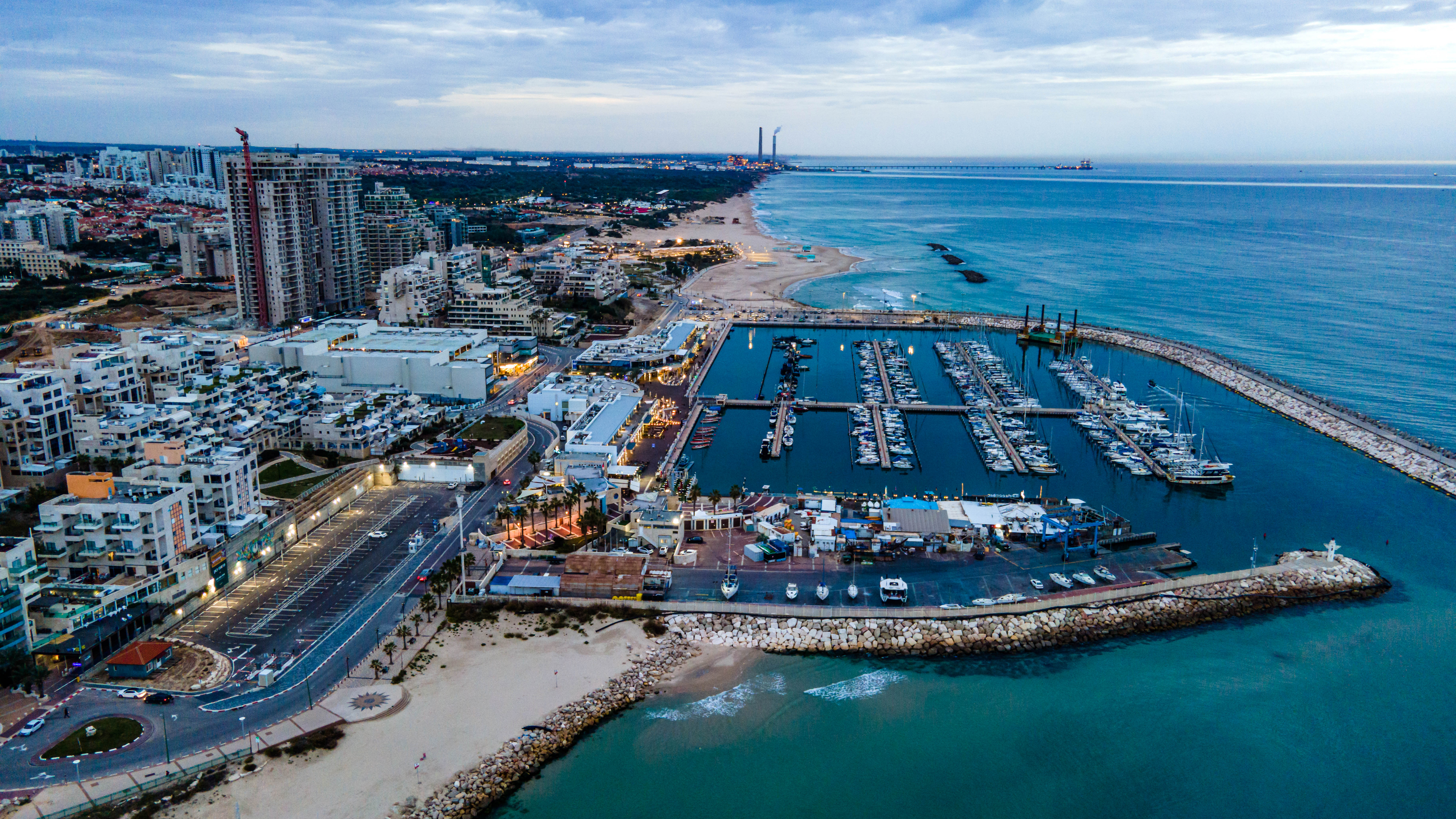
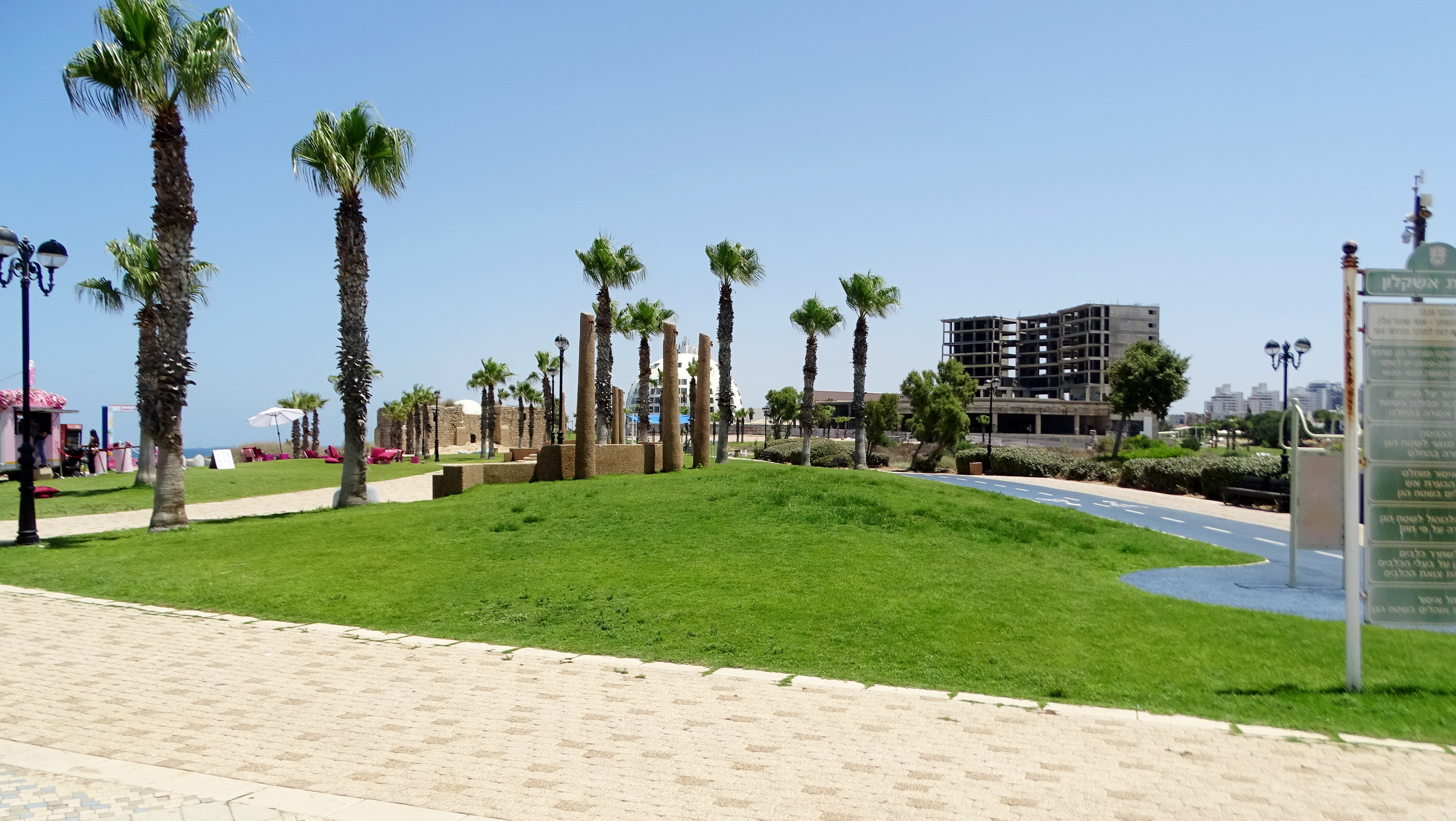
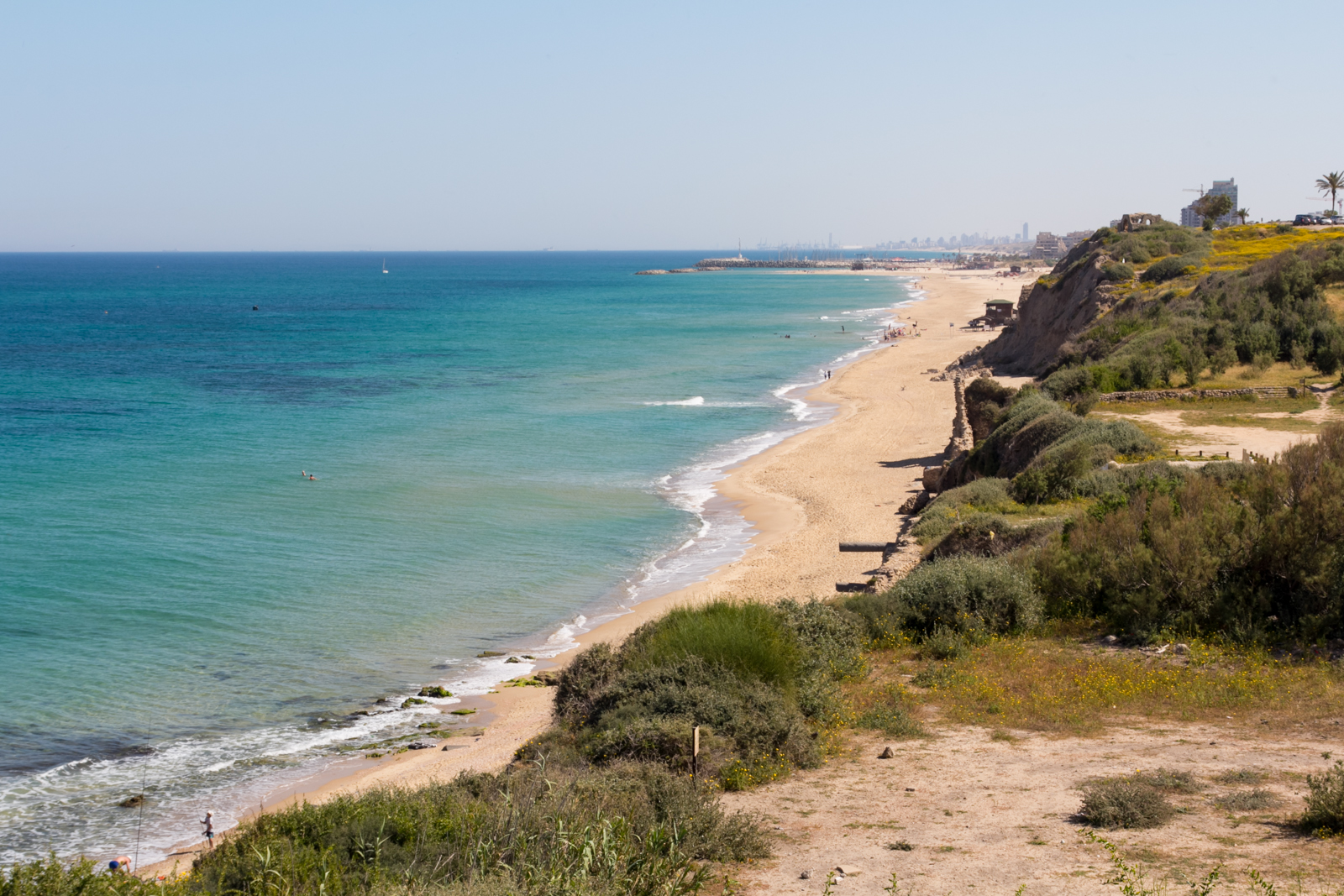
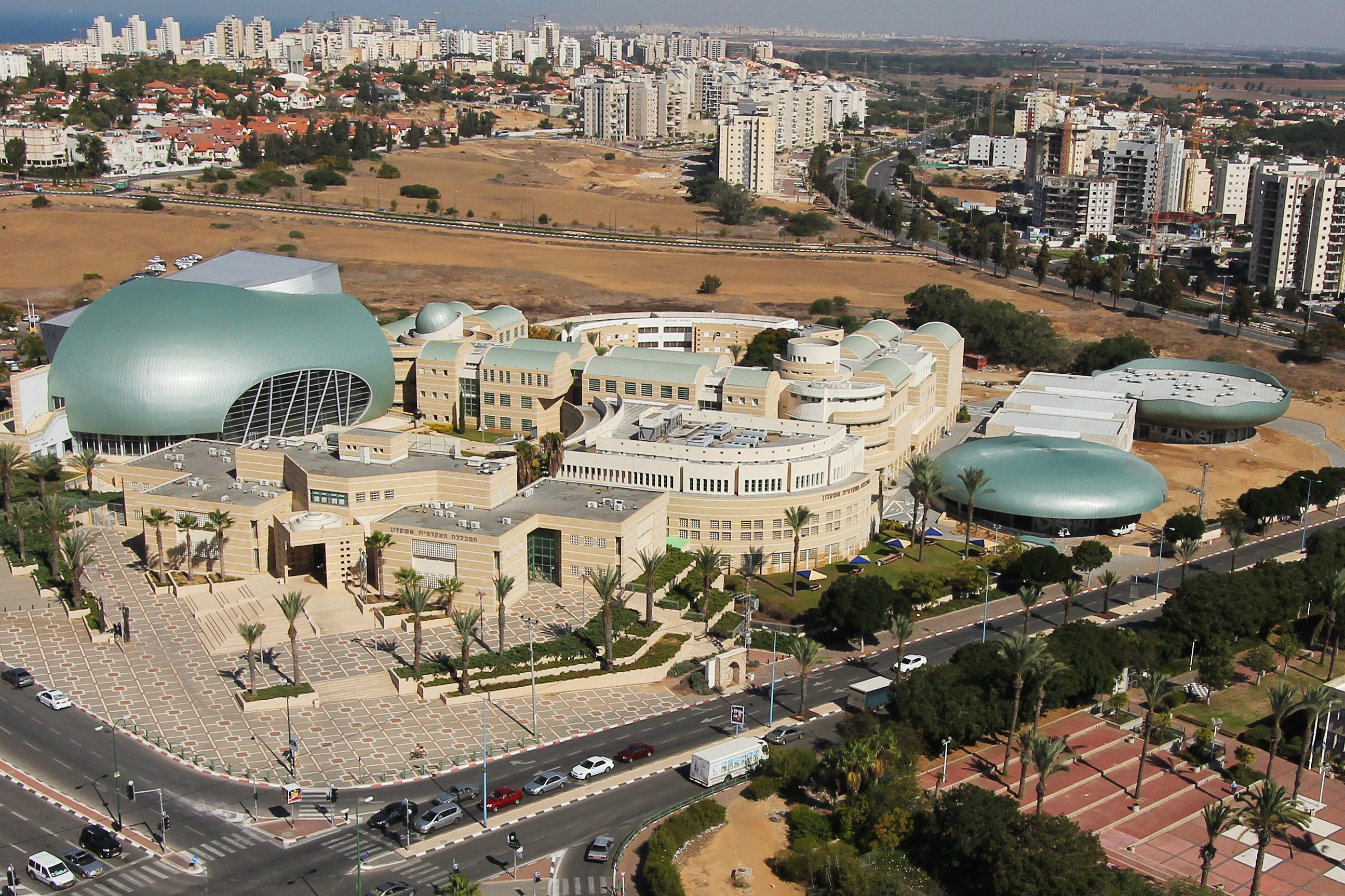
- Ashkelon skyline Ashkelon Marina Tomb of Sheikh Awad Ashkelon National Park Ashkelon Academic College

- Flag Coat of arms
- Interactive map of Ashkelon
- Location within Ashkelon region of Israel Location within Israel
- Country: Israel
- District: Southern
- Subdistrict: Ashkelon
- Natural Region: Ashkelon
- Founded: 5880 BCE (Neolithic settlement); 2000 BCE (Canaanite city); 1150 BCE (Philistine rule); 6th century BCE (Classical city); 15th century CE (Arab village); 1953 (Israeli city)

Government
  - Type: Mayor–council
  - Body: Municipality of Ashkelon
  - Mayor: Tomer Glam

Area
  - Total: 47,788 dunams (47.788 km^{2}; 18.451 sq mi)

Population (2024)
  - Total: 166,864
  - Density: 3,491.8/km^{2} (9,043.6/sq mi)
- Demonym: Ashkelonian
- Time zone: UTC+2 (IST)
  - Summer (DST): UTC+3 (IDT)
- Website: www.ashkelon.muni.il

Ashkelon (/ˈæʃkəlɒn/ ASH-kə-lon; Hebrew: אשקלון, romanized: ʾAšqəlōn, IPA: [ʔaʃkeˈlon]; Arabic: عسقلان, romanized: ʿAsqalān) or Ashqelon, is a coastal city in the Southern District of Israel on the Mediterranean coast, 50 kilometres (30 mi) south of Tel Aviv, and 13 kilometres (8 mi) north of the border with the Gaza Strip. The modern city is named after the ancient seaport of Ascalon, which was destroyed in 1270 and whose remains are on the southwestern edge of the modern metropolis.

The Israeli city, first known as Migdal (Hebrew: מגדל), was founded in 1949 approximately 4 km inland from ancient Ascalon at the Palestinian town of al-Majdal (Arabic: الْمِجْدَل, romanized: al-Mijdal). Its inhabitants had been exclusively Muslims and Christians, and the area had been allocated to the Arab State in the United Nations Partition Plan for Palestine; on the eve of the 1948 Arab–Israeli War the inhabitants numbered 10,000 and in October 1948, the city accommodated thousands more Palestinian refugees from nearby villages.

The town was conquered by Israeli forces on 5 November 1948, by which time much of the Arab population had fled, leaving some 2700 inhabitants, of whom Israeli soldiers deported 500 in December 1948, and most of the rest were deported by 1950. Today, the city's population is almost entirely Israeli Jews.

Migdal, as it was called in Hebrew, was initially repopulated by Jewish immigrants and demobilized soldiers. It was subsequently renamed multiple times, first as Migdal Gaza, Migdal Gad and Migdal Ashkelon, until in 1953, the coastal neighbourhood of Afridar was incorporated, and the name Ashkelon was adopted for the combined town. By 1961, Ashkelon was ranked 18th among Israeli urban centers with a population of 24,000. In 2024 the population of Ashkelon was 166,864, making it the third-largest city in Israel's Southern District.

== Etymology ==
The name Ashkelon is probably Western Semitic, and might be connected to the triliteral root š-q-l 'to weigh', from a Semitic root ṯ-q-l, akin to Hebrew šāqal (שָקַל) or Arabic ṯiql (ثِقْل), 'weight', perhaps attesting to its importance as a center for trade. It appears in late Old Egyptian in the execration texts in a form that suggests the earliest pronunciation was ʾaθqalānu, which shifts to ʾaθqalōnu in Middle Egyptian, demonstrating the Canaanite shift in the 2nd millennium BCE.

Its name appeared in Phoenician and Punic as šqln (𐤔𐤒𐤋𐤍) and ʾšqln (𐤀𐤔𐤒𐤋𐤍). Majdal (Arabic) and Migdal (Hebrew) mean 'tower'.

== History ==
=== Ancient Ascalon (Asqalanu) ===
The archaeological site of Ascalon, today known as Tel Ashkelon, was the oldest and largest seaport in Canaan, part of Philistia, the pentapolis (a grouping of five cities) of the Philistines, north of Gaza City and south of Jaffa.

The site was an important city during Roman, Byzantine and pre-Crusades Muslim rule, and particularly during the period of the Kingdom of Jerusalem, due to its location near the coast and between the Crusader states and Egypt. The Battle of Ascalon was the last action of the First Crusade. In 1270, the Mamluk sultan Baybars ordered the fortifications and harbour of Ascalon to be destroyed. Its inhabitants moved to Majdal 'Asqalān, which was established by Baybars as a substitute 3 kilometres (1.9 mi) inland, and endowed with a magnificent congregational mosque, a marketplace and religious shrines.

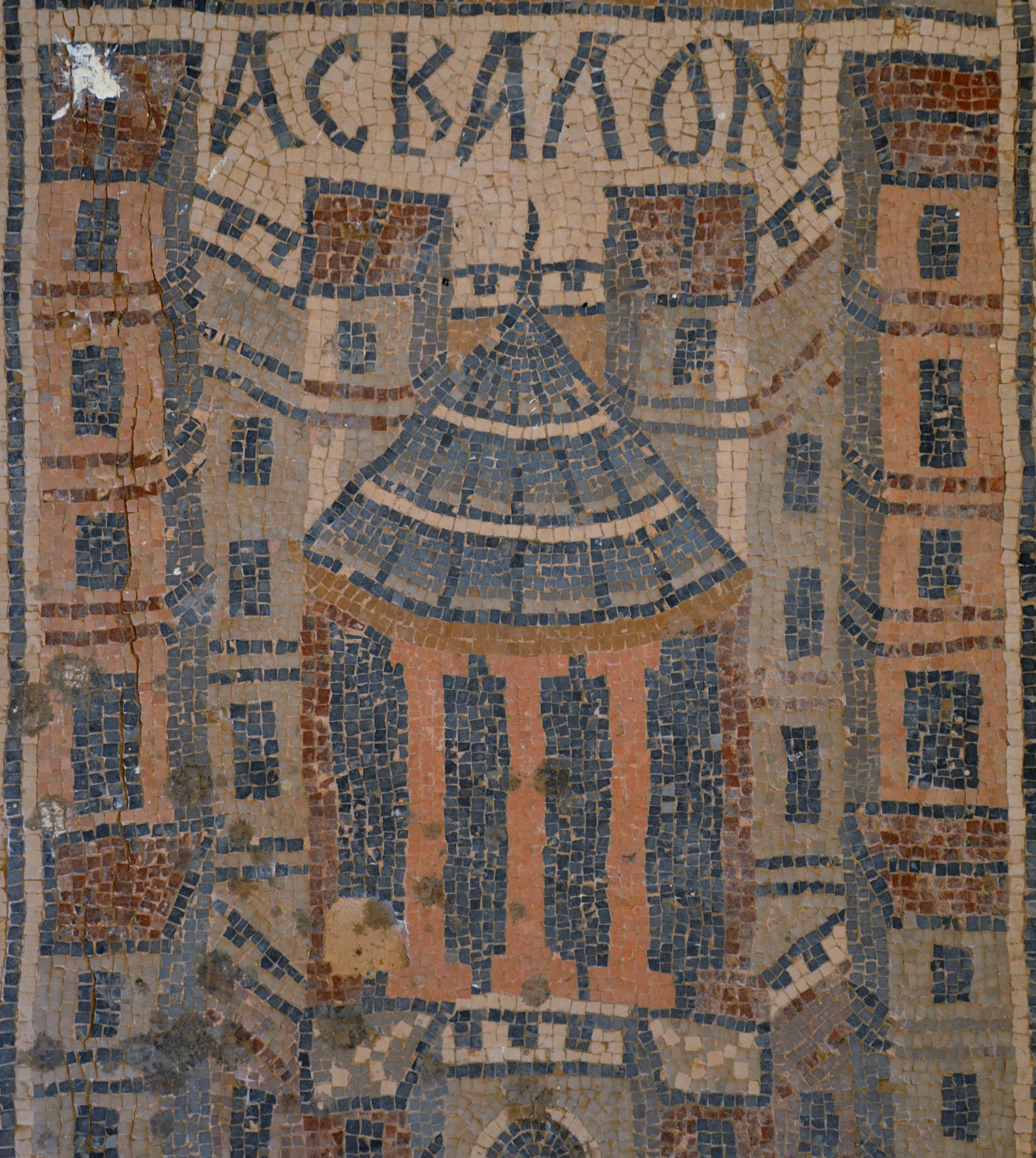
Depiction of Askalon (Ashkelon) in the Umm ar-Rasas mosaics, 8th century CE

=== Al Majdal, Asqalan ===
Established by Baybars following the destruction of Ascalon in the 13th century, the Arab town of Majdal 'Asqalan is mentioned by historians and tourists at the end of the 15th century. In 1596, Ottoman records showed Majdal to be a large village of 559 Muslim households, making it the 7th-most-populous locality in Palestine after Safad, Jerusalem, Gaza, Nablus, Hebron and Kafr Kanna. Al-Majdal derived part of its prosperity from its location along on the Cairo-Damascus road.

An official Ottoman village list of about 1870 showed that Medschdel had a total of 420 houses and a population of 1175, though the population count included men only.

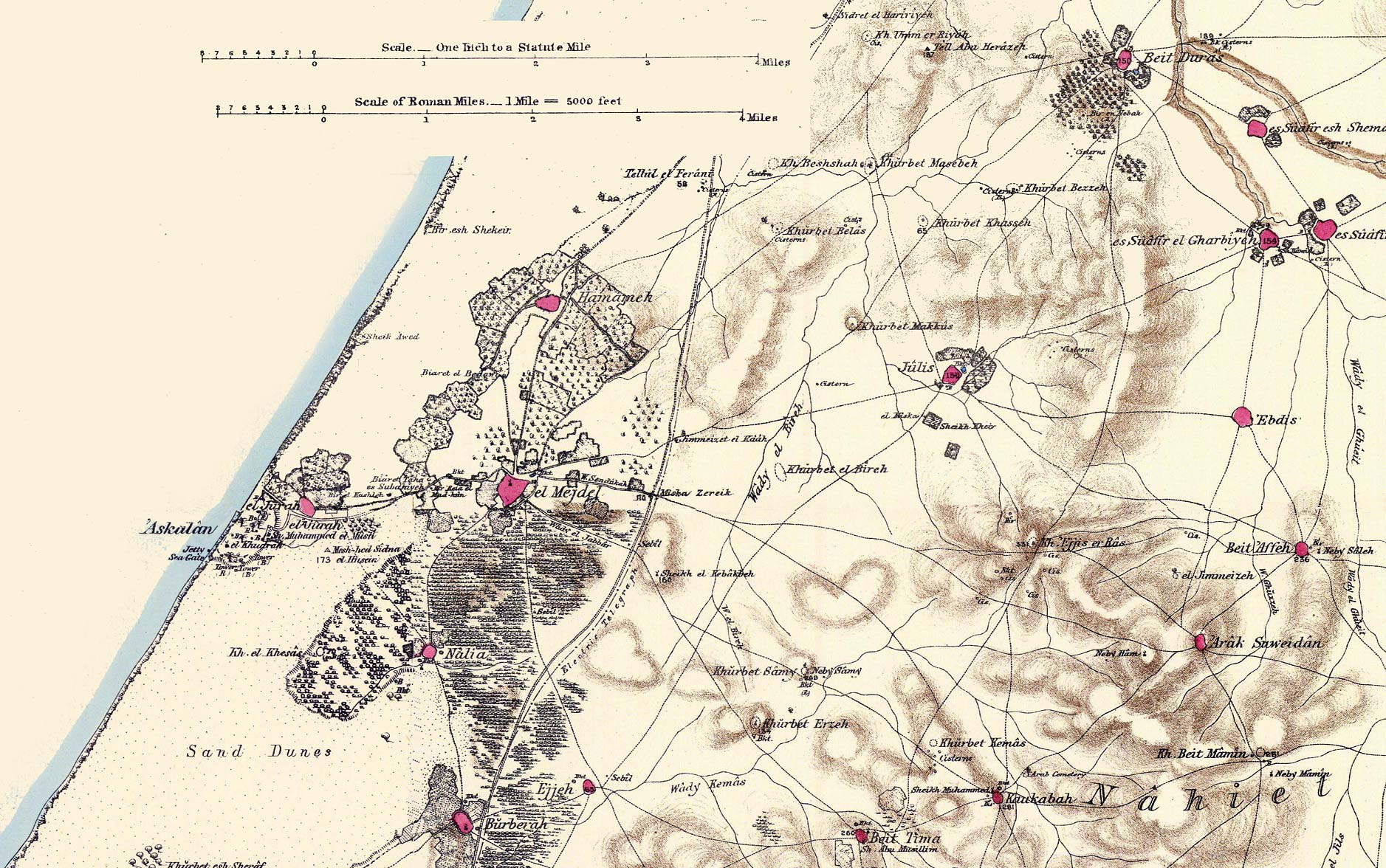
The area of modern Ashkelon cover the land of: Al Majdal, Hamama, Al-Jura, Al-Khisas and Ni'ilya. The ruins of Ascalon are also shown on the left hand side. Images from the 1871–77 PEF Survey of Palestine.

In the 1922 census of Palestine, Majdal had a population of 5,064; 33 Christians and 5,031 Muslims, increasing in the 1931 census to 6,226 (6,166 Muslims and 41 Christians) with 172 in the suburbs (167 Muslims, 4 Christians, and one Jew).

In the 1945 statistics Majdal had a population of 9,910; ninety Christians and 9,820 Muslims, with a total (urban and rural) of 43,680 dunams of land, according to an official land and population survey. 2,050 dunams were public land; all the rest was owned by Arabs. of the dunams, 2,337 were used for citrus and bananas, 2,886 were plantations and irrigable land, 35,442 for cereals, while 1,346 were built-up land.

During the Late Ottoman and Mandatory periods, al-Majdal developed into the primary textile and weaving center of the Gaza District. While cotton production elsewhere in Palestine declined in the 19th century, weavers in al-Majdal maintained their industry by importing raw thread from Egypt, India, and Europe, operating hundreds of manual looms (nūl). By the 1940s, approximately 2,000 looms operated in the town—frequently installed directly within private residential rooms—producing distinctively striped coarse fabrics used for traditional ‘abaya coats and southern regional dresses.

Majdal was known for the majdalawi weaving industry. During the Late Ottoman and Mandatory periods, al-Majdal developed into the primary textile and weaving center of the Gaza District. While cotton production elsewhere in Palestine declined in the 19th century, weavers in al-Majdal maintained their industry by importing raw thread from Egypt, India, and Europe, operating hundreds of manual looms (nūl).The town had around 500 looms in 1909. In 1920 a British Government report estimated that there were 550 cotton looms in the town with an annual output worth 30–40 million francs. By the 1940s, approximately 2,000 looms operated in the town—frequently installed directly within private residential rooms—producing distinctively striped coarse fabrics used for traditional ‘abaya coats and southern regional dresses. The three major fabrics produced were "malak" (silk), 'ikhdari' (bands of red and green) and 'jiljileh' (dark red bands). These were used for festival dresses throughout Southern Palestine. Many other fabrics were produced, some with poetic names such as ji'nneh u nar ("heaven and hell"), nasheq rohoh ("breath of the soul") and abu mitayn ("father of two hundred").

In addition to agriculture, residents practiced animal husbandry which formed was an important source of income for the town. In 1943, they owned 354 heads of cattle, 168 sheep over a year old, 170 goats over a year old, 65 camels, 17 horses, 39 mules, 447 donkeys, 2966 fowls, and 808 pigeons.

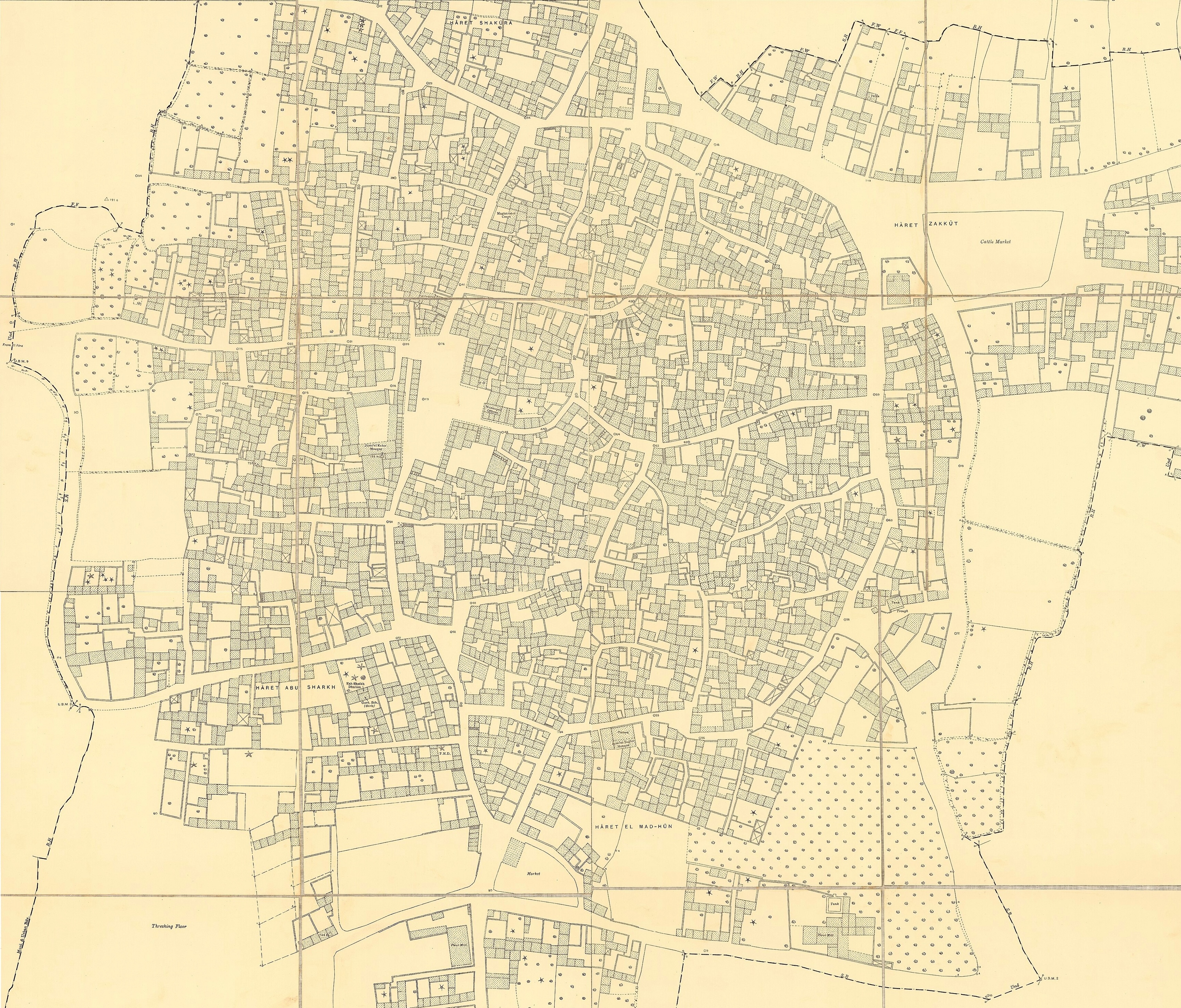
1931-2 map of central El Majdal. Nearly all Palestinians who lived here and survived the 1947-8 Nakba were at first confined to a ghetto, then later expelled

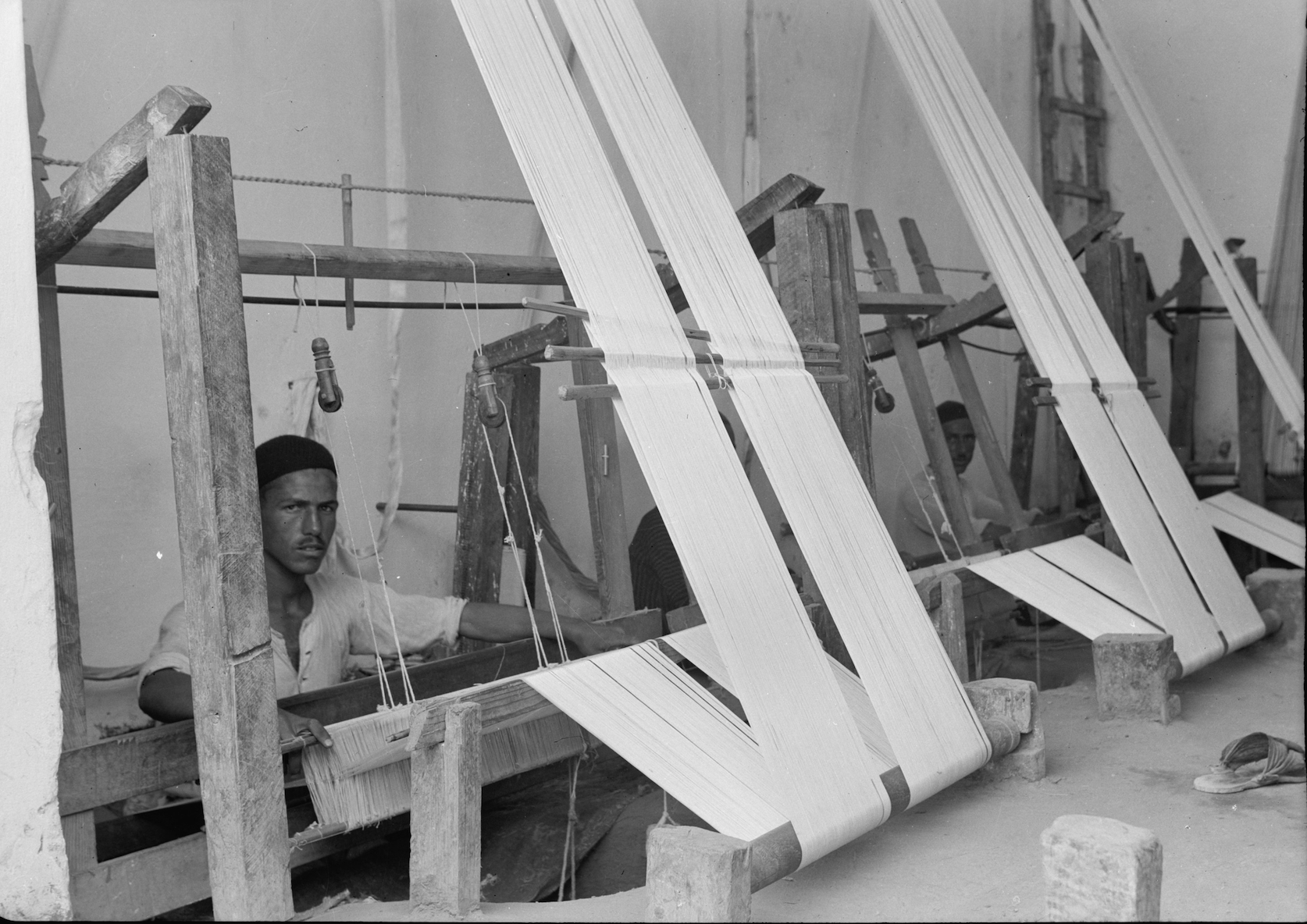
Weavers in Majdal, 1934–39

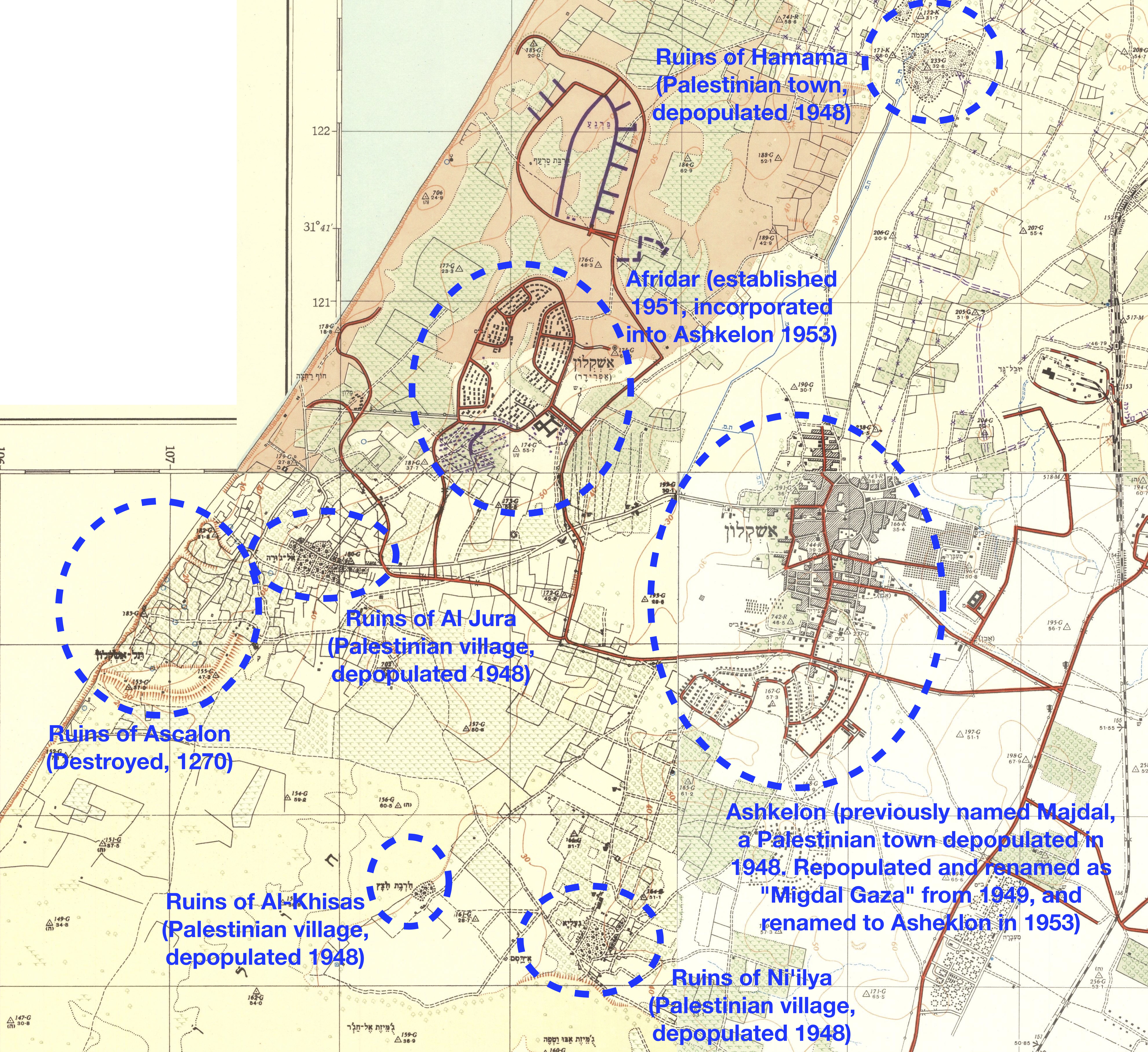
The beginnings of the modern city of Ashkelon shown in the 1950s Survey of Israel. The built up area labeled אשקלון (Ashkelon) is the area previously known as Majdal. To the left is Afridar. The ruins of Hamama, Al-Jura, Ni'ilya and Al-Khisas are also shown.

=== 1948 war and depopulation of Palestinians ===
Majdal was occupied by the Egyptian army in the early stages of the 1948 Palestine war, along with the rest of the Gaza region, which had been allocated to the Arab State in the United Nations plan. Over the next few months, the town was subjected to Israeli air raids and shelling. All but about 1,000 of the town's residents were forced to leave by the time it was captured by Israeli forces as a sequel to Operation Yoav on 4 November 1948. General Yigal Allon ordered the expulsion of the remaining Palestinians, but the local commanders did not do so. The Arab population soon recovered to more than 2500, due mostly to refugees slipping back and also due to the transfer of Palestinians from nearby villages. Most were elderly, women, or children. During the next year or so, the Palestinians were held in a confined area surrounded by barbed wire, which became commonly known as the "ghetto".

Moshe Dayan and Prime Minister David Ben-Gurion were in favor of expulsion, while Mapam and the Israeli labor union Histadrut objected. The government offered the Palestinians positive inducements to leave, including a favorable currency exchange, but also caused panic through night-time raids. The first group was deported to the Gaza Strip by truck on 17 August 1950 after an expulsion order had been served. Deportation was approved by Ben-Gurion and Dayan over the objections of Pinhas Lavon, secretary-general of the Histadrut, who envisioned the town as a productive example of equal opportunity. By October 1950, twenty Palestinian families remained, most of whom later moved to Lydda or Gaza.

In 1951, a trial took place concerning the killing of Arab civilians in al-Majdal in 1949. The case focused on soldiers from a company stationed there to prevent Arabs from returning to the town. The tribunal found that “the soldiers sometimes ran wild,” and that some believed they were free to treat Arabs, especially “infiltrators,” as they wished. Based on testimony the court deemed credible, the killing of Arabs was regarded as “legal” by some fighters, and the person who killed was perceived among his comrades as a “chaver-man” (a “buddy” figure). The trial also discussed an incident in which young Arabs infiltrated al-Majdal to visit their parents who had remained in the town; soldiers captured them and executed them. In an unusual development, the report states that because the parents remained inside Israel, they testified in court, including an account by the father describing his son’s return from Gaza and the discovery of his body with bullet wounds to the chest, head, and back, as well as signs of beating.

According to Israeli records, in total 2,333 Palestinians were transferred to the Gaza Strip, 60 to Jordan, 302 to other towns in Israel, and a small number remained in Ashkelon. Lavon argued that this operation dissipated "the last shred of trust the Arabs had in Israel, the sincerity of the State's declarations on democracy and civil equality, and the last remnant of confidence the Arab workers had in the Histadrut." Acting on an Egyptian complaint, the Egyptian-Israel Mixed Armistice Commission ruled that the Palestinians transferred from Majdal should be returned to Israel, but this was not done.

=== Repopulation of Ashkelon by Israelis ===
Majdal was granted to Israel in the 1949 Armistice Agreements. Re-population of the recently vacated Arab dwellings by Jews had been official policy since at least December 1948, but the process began slowly. The Israeli national plan of June 1949 designated al-Majdal as the site for a regional urban center of 20,000 people. From July 1949, new immigrants and demobilized soldiers moved to the new town, increasing the Jewish population to 2,500 within six months. These early immigrants were mostly from Yemen, North Africa, and Europe.

In 1949, the town was renamed Migdal Gaza, and then Migdal Gad. Soon after, it became Migdal Ashkelon. The city expanded as the population grew. In 1951, the neighborhood of Afridar was established for Jewish immigrants from South Africa, and in 1953 it was incorporated into the city. The current name Ashkelon was adopted and the town was granted local council status in 1953.

In 1955, Ashkelon had more than 16,000 residents. By 1961, Ashkelon ranked 18th among Israeli urban centers with a population of 24,000. This grew to 43,000 in 1972 and 53,000 in 1983. In 2005, the population exceeded 106,000.

In 1949 and 1950, three immigrant transit camps (ma'abarot) were established alongside Majdal (renamed Migdal) for Jewish refugees from Arab countries, Romania and Poland. Northwest of Migdal and the immigrant camps, on the lands of the depopulated Palestinian village of al-Jura, entrepreneur Zvi Segal, one of the signatories of Israel's Declaration of Independence, established the upscale Barnea neighborhood.

A large tract of land south of Barnea was handed over to the trusteeship of the South African Zionist Federation, which established the neighborhood of Afridar. Plans for the city were drawn up in South Africa according to the garden city model. Migdal was surrounded by a broad ring of orchards. Barnea developed slowly, but Afridar grew rapidly. The first homes, built in 1951, were occupied by new Jewish immigrants from South Africa and South America, as well as some native-born Israelis. The first public housing project for residents of the transit camps, the Southern Hills Project (Hageva'ot Hadromiyot), also known as Zion Hill (Givat Zion), was built in 1952.

The Sheikh Omar Hadid Brigade launched a series of attempted rocket attacks toward Ashkelon from the Gaza Strip in 2015. These included unsuccessful launches in June, August, September, and October, and one strike on September 18 that destroyed a bus and a residence but caused no reported casualties.

Under a plan signed in October 2015, seven new neighborhoods comprising 32,000 housing units, a new stretch of highway, and three new highway interchanges will be built, turning Ashkelon into the sixth-largest city in Israel.

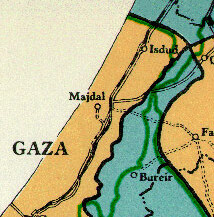
The area around Majdal had been allocated to the Arab state in the United Nations Partition Plan for Palestine.

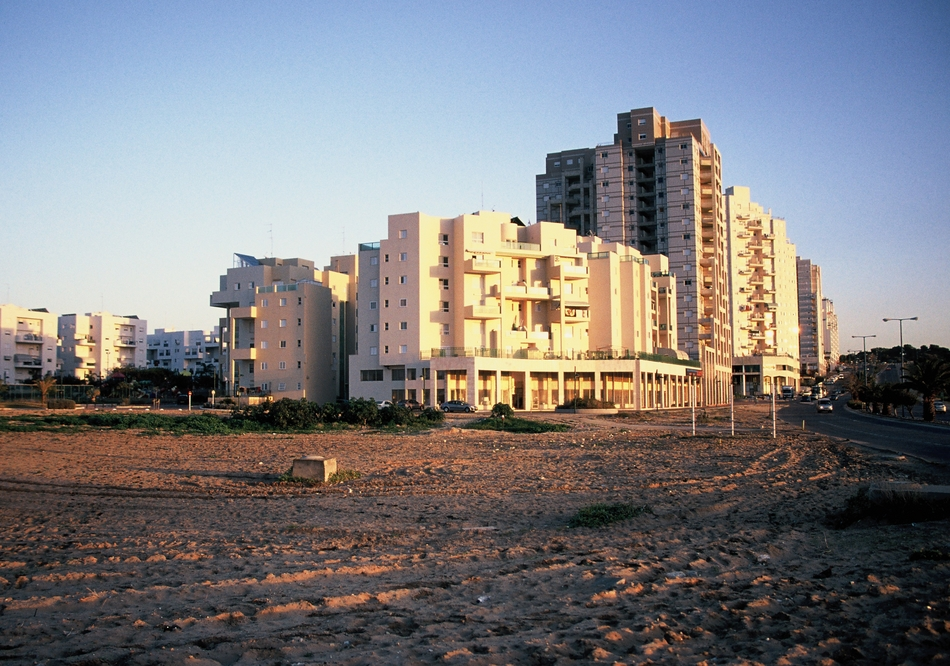
High-rise residential development along the beach (2007)

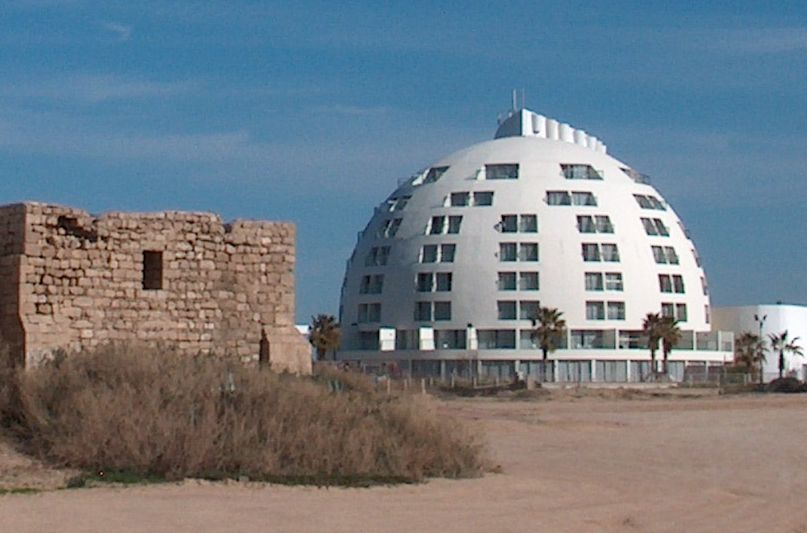
Harlington Hotel and 13th-century tomb of Sheikh Awad

== Landmarks ==
The town’s historic architecture was built predominantly using local kurkar sandstone, with extensive secondary reuse (spolia) of marble columns and capitals taken from ancient Tel Ashkelon.

=== Ashkelon National Park ===
The ancient site of Ascalon is now administered as the Ashkelon National Park. The walls that encircled the city are still visible, as well as Canaanite earth ramparts. The park contains mainly Roman, Byzantine, and Crusader ruins. The largest dog cemetery in the ancient world was discovered in Ashkelon.

A Roman burial tomb two kilometres north of Ashkelon National Park was discovered in 1937. There are two burial tombs, a painted Hellenistic cave and a Roman cave. The Hellenistic cave is decorated with paintings of nymphs, water scenes, mythological figures and animals.

=== Bathhouses ===
In 1986 ruins of 4th- to 6th-century baths were found in Ashkelon. The bathhouses are believed to have been used for prostitution. The remains of nearly 100 mostly male infants were found in a sewer under the bathhouse, leading to conjectures that prostitutes had discarded their unwanted newborns there.

=== Byzantine Church ===
The remains of a 4th-century Byzantine church with marble slab flooring and glass mosaic walls can be seen in the Barnea Quarter. Remains of a synagogue from this period have also been found.

=== Mashhad al-Imam al-Husayn ===
An 11th-century mosque, Maqam al-Imam al-Husayn, a site of pilgrimage for both Sunni and Shia Muslims, which had been built by the Fatimid Caliphate by Badr al-Jamali and where tradition held that the head of Mohammad's grandson Hussein ibn Ali was buried, was blown up by the Israel Defense Forces under instructions from Moshe Dayan as part of a broader programme to destroy mosques in July 1950. The area was subsequently redeveloped for a local Israeli hospital, Barzilai. After the site was re-identified on the hospital grounds, funds from Mohammed Burhanuddin, leader of a Shi'a Ismaili sect based in India, were used to construct a small marble prayer platform, which is visited by Shi'ite pilgrims from India and Pakistan.

A domed structure housing the 13th-century tomb of Sheikh Awad sits atop a hill overlooking Ashkelon's northern beaches.

=== The Great and Small Mosques ===
the Great Mosque (al-Jāmi‘ al-Kabīr), founded in 1300 by Mamluk Sultan al-Nāṣir Muḥammad, and the Small Mosque (al-Jāmi‘ al-Ṣaghīr), which features Ottoman vaulted ceilings reinforced with ceramic clay tubes (kizāns).

==== Museums ====
Today the Great Mosque houses the "Ashkelon Khan and Museum", with an archaeological exhibition of a replica of Ashkelon's Canaanite silver calf, whose discovery was reported on the front page of The New York Times.

The Outdoor Museum near the municipal cultural center displays two Roman burial coffins made of marble depicting battle and hunting scenes, and famous mythological scenes.

=== Marina and water park ===
The Ashkelon Marina, located between Delila and Bar Kochba beaches, offers a shipyard and repair services. Ashkeluna is a water-slide park on Ashkelon beach.

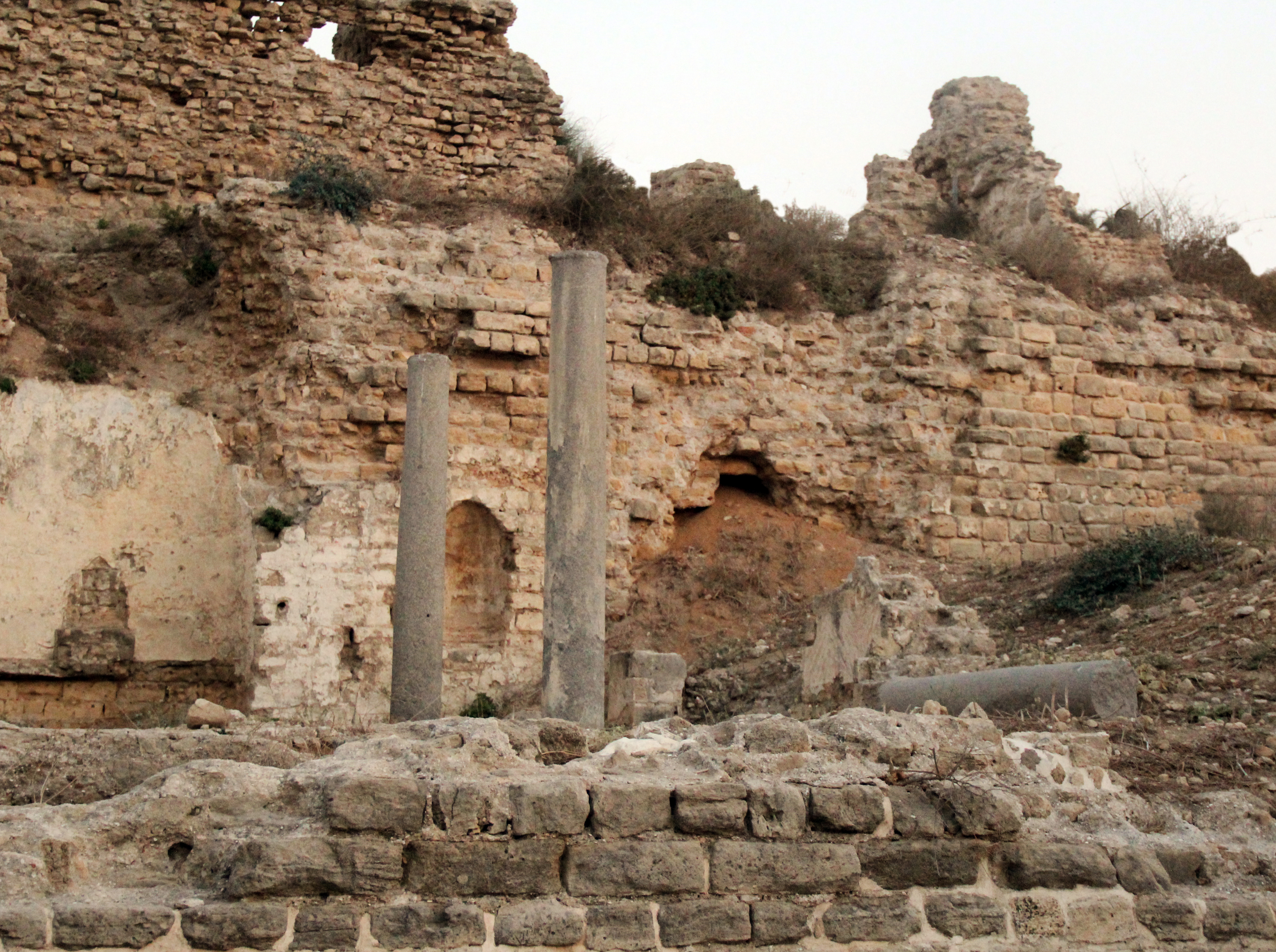
Ashkelon National Park

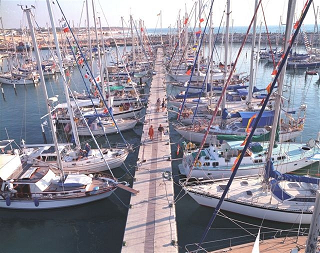
Ashkelon Marina

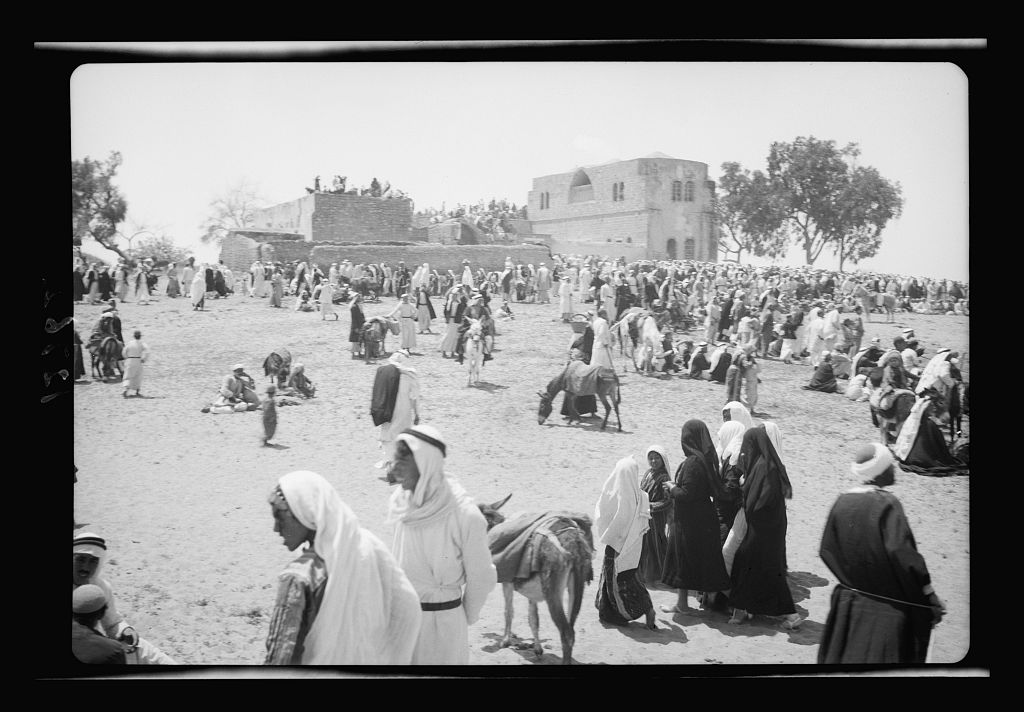
Palestinian Muslims at Mejdal, in Mandatory Palestine in April 1943, with Maqam al-Imam al-Husayn in the background.

== Palestinians and Ashkelon ==
=== Origins of Hamas ===
Family origins of Hamas leaders.

Most of the founding members of Hamas were born in Mandatory Palestine, outside of the Gaza Strip, or have parents who were. Many of them were from villages that were in the vicinity of present-day Ashkelon, including most of the party's leaders:

- Founding leader Ahmed Yassin was born in Al-Jura.
- Yassin's successor Abdel Aziz al-Rantisi was born in Yibna.
- The father of Faiq and Mahmoud Al-Mabhouh was from Bayt Tima.
- Ismail Haniyeh's parents migrated from Al-Jura to Gaza in 1948.
- Yahya Sinwar was born in the Khan Yunis in Egyptian-occupied Gaza in 1962 to a family who left Ashkelon (then called Al-Majdal) during the 1948 Palestine War.
- Muhammad Hassan Shama was born in Ashkelon in 1935 before was expelled from the city during the 1948 Palestine war.
- One of few exceptions is Khaled Mashal, who was born in Silwad, in the Jordanian ruled West Bank.

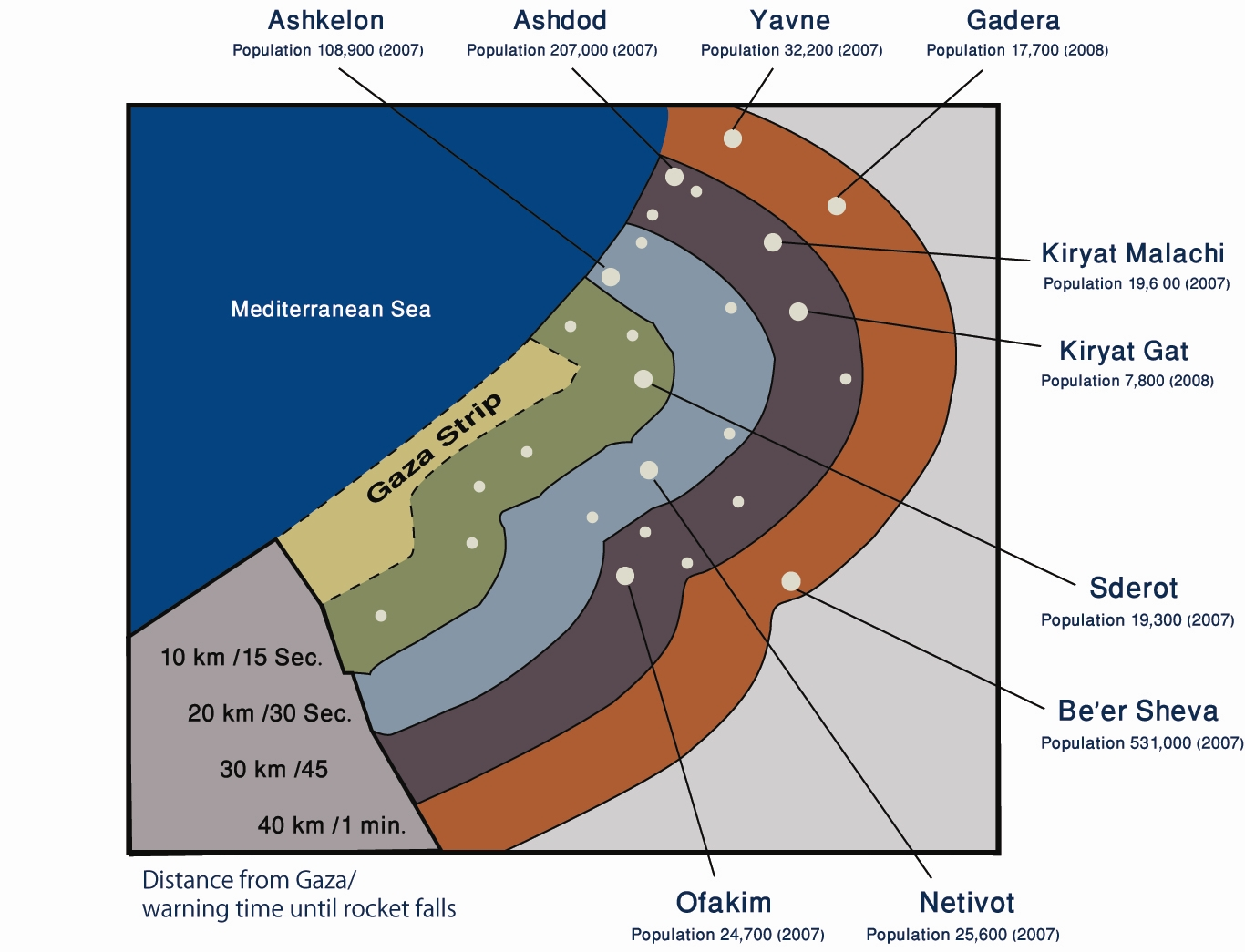
Ashkelon is located in the 20–30 seconds' run to safety area due to BM-21 Grad rocket range.

=== Palestinian conflict with modern Ashkelon ===
On 1–2 March 2008, rockets fired by Hamas from the Gaza Strip (some of them Grad rockets) hit Ashkelon, wounding seven, and causing property damage. Mayor Roni Mahatzri stated that "This is a state of war, I know no other definition for it. If it lasts a week or two, we can handle that, but we have no intention of allowing this to become part of our daily routine." In March 2008, 230 buildings and 30 cars were damaged by rocket fire on Ashkelon.

On 12 May 2008, a rocket fired from the northern Gazan city of Beit Lahiya hit a shopping mall in southern Ashkelon, causing significant structural damage. According to The Jerusalem Post, four people were seriously injured and 87 were treated for shock. Fifteen people suffered minor to moderate injuries as a result of the collapsed structure. Southern District Police chief Uri Bar-Lev believed the Grad-model Katyusha rocket was manufactured in Iran.

In March 2009, a Qassam rocket hit a school, destroying classrooms and injuring two people.

In November 2014, the mayor, Itamar Shimoni, began a policy of discrimination against Arab workers, refusing to allow them to work on city projects to build bomb shelters for children. His discriminatory actions brought criticism from others, including Israeli Prime Minister Benjamin Netanyahu and Jerusalem mayor Nir Barkat who likened the discrimination to the anti-Semitism experienced by Jews in Europe 70 years earlier.

On May 11, 2021, Hamas fired 137 rockets on Ashkelon killing 2 and injuring many others.

On October 10, 2023, during the Gaza war, Abu Obaida, spokesperson for Hamas, warned all citizens of Ashkelon to evacuate before 5:00 P.M. local time via a post to his Telegram channel. Once the deadline hit, Hamas launched a barrage of missiles towards Ashkelon.

== Demographics ==
Historical population
Year	Pop.	±%
1955	16,600	—
1961	24,300	+46.4%
1972	43,000	+77.0%
1983	52,900	+23.0%
1995	83,100	+57.1%
2008	110,600	+33.1%
2010	114,500	+3.5%
2011	117,400	+2.5%
2022	152,370	+29.8%
2024	166,865	+9.5%

In the early years, the city was primarily inhabited by Mizrahi Jews, who moved to Israel after being expelled or migrating from Muslim lands. Today, Mizrahi Jews still constitute the majority of the population. In the early 1950s, many South African Jews settled in Ashkelon, establishing the Afridar neighbourhood. They were followed by an influx of immigrants from the United Kingdom. During the 1990s, the city received additional arrivals of Ethiopian Jews and Russian Jews.

== Ashkelon today ==
=== Economy ===
Ashkelon is the northern terminus for the Trans-Israel pipeline, which brings petroleum products from Eilat to an oil terminal at the port. The Ashkelon seawater reverse osmosis (SWRO) desalination plant is the largest in the world. The project was developed as a BOT (build–operate–transfer) by a consortium of three international companies: Veolia water, IDE Technologies and Elran. In March 2006, it was voted "Desalination Plant of the Year" in the Global Water Awards.

Since 1992, Israel Beer Breweries has been operating in Ashkelon, brewing Carlsberg and Tuborg beer for the Israeli market.

=== Culture and sports ===
The Ashkelon Sports Arena opened in 1999. The "Jewish Eye" is a Jewish world film festival that takes place annually in Ashkelon. The festival marked its seventh year in 2010. The Breeza Music Festival has been held yearly in and around Ashkelon's amphitheatre since 1992. Most of the musical performances are free. Israel Lacrosse operates substantial youth lacrosse programs in the city and recently hosted the Turkey men's national team in Israel's first home international in 2013.

There is also a museum and art gallery called Ashkelon Khan Museum located in what was the Great Mosque (Jamia al-Kabir) that was constructed by Sayf al-Din Salar in 1300.

=== Health care ===
Ashkelon and environs is served by the Barzilai Medical Center, established in 1961. It was built in place of Hussein ibn Ali's 11th-century mosque, a center of Muslim pilgrimages, destroyed by the Israeli army in 1950. Situated ten kilometres (6 mi) from Gaza, the hospital has been the target of numerous Qassam rocket attacks, sometimes as many as 140 over one weekend. The hospital plays a vital role in treating wounded soldiers and terror victims. A rocket and missile-proof emergency room opened in February 2018.

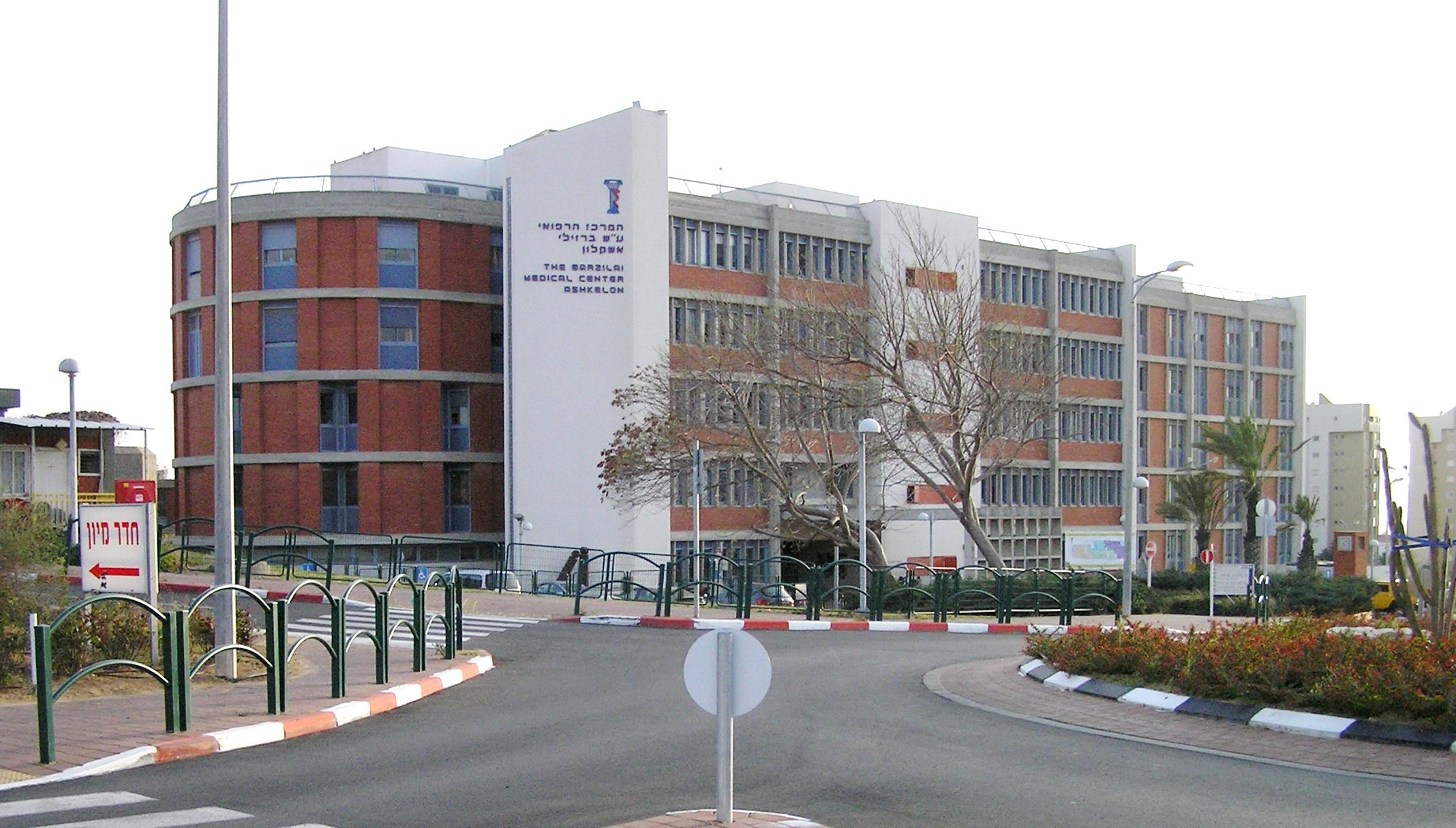
Barzilai Medical Center.

=== Education ===
The city has 19 elementary schools, and nine junior high and high schools. The Ashkelon Academic College opened in 1998, and now hosts thousands of students. Harvard University operates an archaeological summer school program in Ashkelon.

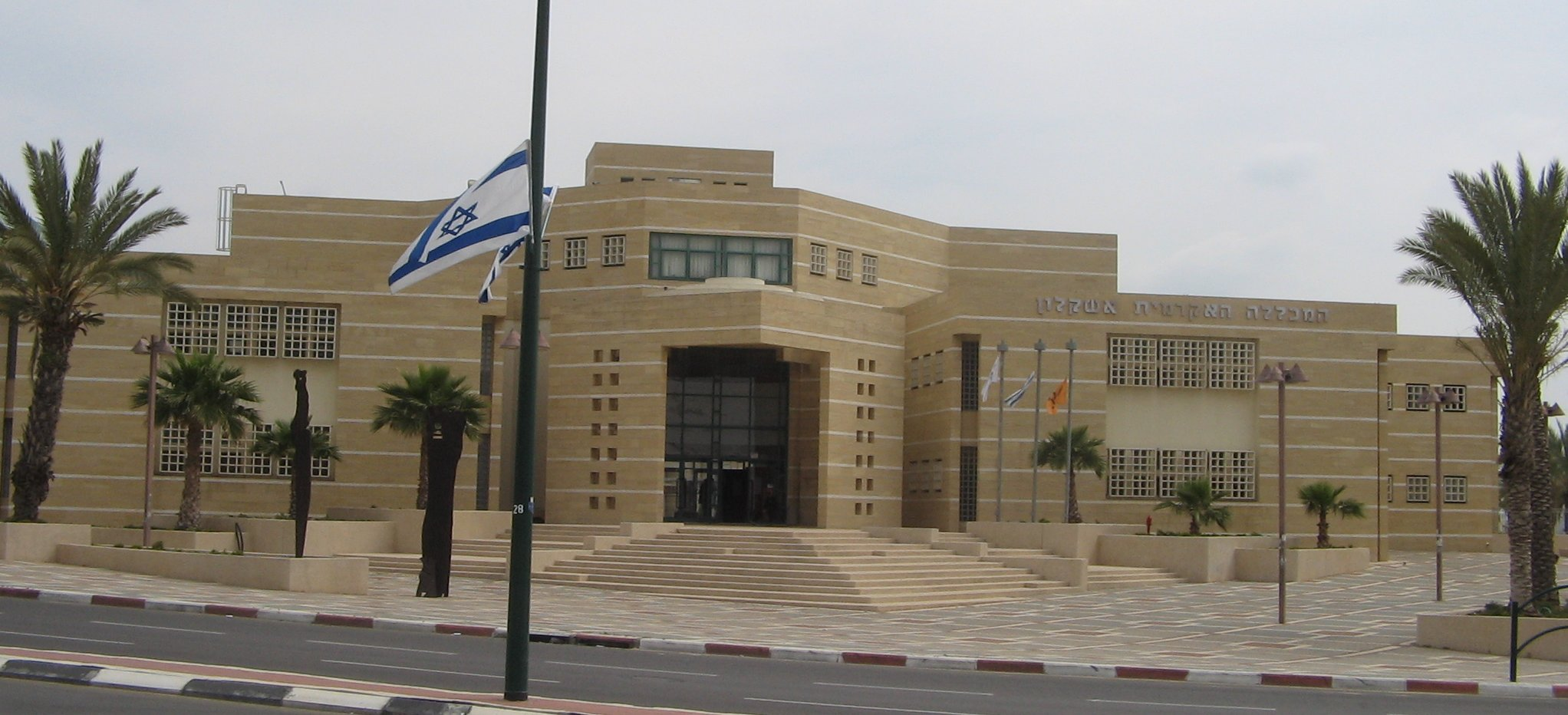
Ashkelon Academic College.

== Voting Patterns ==
In the 2022 election, 66 percent of voters in Ashkelon voted for the parties of the right-wing coalition led by Benjamin Netanyahu, while 32 percent voted for the parties of the center-left coalition led by Yair Lapid and 0.1 percent voted for the Arab parties.

In the 2026 election, 61 percent of voters in Ashkelon voted for the parties of the right-wing coalition led by Benjamin Netanyahu, while 32 percent voted for the parties of the center-left coalition led by Gadi Eisenkot and 0.2 percent voted for the Arab parties. An additional 4 percent voted for the Reservists, and 1.8 percent voted for Amcha Yisrael. Voter turnout increased 28 percent from the 2022 election.

== Twin towns – sister cities ==
Ashkelon is twinned with:

- Côte Saint-Luc, Quebec, Canada
- Grodno, Belarus
- Xinyang, China
- Iquique, Chile
- Aix-en-Provence, France
- (Georgia (country)) Vani, Georgia
- (Georgia (country)) Kutaisi, Georgia
- Aviano, Italy
- Berlin-Pankow, Germany
- Entebbe, Uganda
- Portland, Oregon, United States
- Baltimore, Maryland, United States
- Sacramento, California, United States

Former:

- Sopot, Poland (city partnership terminated in November 2025, citing the Gaza genocide.)

== Notable people ==
- Ahmed Yasin (1936–2004), Palestinian, the first leader of Hamas.
- Yitzhak Cohen (born 1951), Israeli politician, from the Shas faction.
- Avi Dichter (born 1952), Israeli politician, from the Likud faction.
- Eva Erben (born 1930), Czech-Israeli writer and Holocaust survivor
- Boris Polak (born 1954), world champion and Olympic sport shooter.
- Shlomo Glickstein (born 1958), professional tennis player.
- Yael Abecassis (born 1967), actress and model.
- Topaz Luk (born 1992), political advisor.
- Zion Golan (born 1955), Israeli singer.

== See also ==
- Scallion and shallot, types of onion known from and named after ancient Ascalon – Ascalōnia caepa or Ascalonian onion

== Bibliography ==
- Barron, J.B., ed. (1923). Palestine: Report and General Abstracts of the Census of 1922. Government of Palestine.
- Canaan, T. (1927). Mohammedan Saints and Sanctuaries in Palestine. London: Luzac & Co.
- Garfinkel, Y.; Dag, D.; Hesse, B.; Wapnish, P.; Rookis, D.; Hartman, G.; Bar-Yosef, D.E.; Lernau, O. (2005). "Neolithic Ashkelon: Meat Processing and Early Pastoralism on the Mediterranean Coast". Eurasian Prehistory. 3: 43–72.
- Garfinkel, Y.; Dag, D. (2008). Neolithic Ashkelon. Qedem 47. Jerusalem: Institute of Archaeology, Hebrew University. OCLC 494272503.
- Golan, Arnon (2003). "Jewish Settlement of Former Arab Towns and their Incorporation into the Israeli Urban System (1948–1950)". Israel Affairs. 9 (1–2): 149–164. doi:10.1080/714003467. S2CID 144137499.
- Government of Palestine, Department of Statistics (1945). Village Statistics, April, 1945.
- Hadawi, S. (1970). Village Statistics of 1945: A Classification of Land and Area ownership in Palestine. Palestine Liberation Organization Research Center. Archived from the original on 8 December 2018.
- Hartmann, M. (1883). "Die Ortschaftenliste des Liwa Jerusalem in dem türkischen Staatskalender für Syrien auf das Jahr 1288 der Flucht (1871)". Zeitschrift des Deutschen Palästina-Vereins. 6: 102–149.
- Hartmann, R. & Lewis, B. (1960). "Askalan". In Gibb, H. A. R.; Kramers, J. H.; Lévi-Provençal, E.; Schacht, J.; Lewis, B. & Pellat, Ch. (eds.). The Encyclopaedia of Islam, Second Edition. Volume I: A–B. Leiden: E. J. Brill. pp. 710–711. OCLC 495469456.
- Huss, Werner (1985), Geschichte der Karthager, Munich: C.H. Beck, ISBN 978-3-406-30654-9. (in German)
- Hütteroth, W.-D.; Abdulfattah, K. (1977). Historical Geography of Palestine, Transjordan and Southern Syria in the Late 16th Century. Erlanger Geographische Arbeiten, Sonderband 5. Erlangen, Germany: Vorstand der Fränkischen Geographischen Gesellschaft. ISBN 978-3-920405-41-4.
- Kafkafi, Eyal (1998). "Segregation or Integration of the Israeli Arabs: Two Concepts in Mapai". International Journal of Middle East Studies. 30 (3): 347–367. doi:10.1017/S0020743800066216. S2CID 161862941.
- Khalidi, W. (1992). All That Remains: The Palestinian Villages Occupied and Depopulated by Israel in 1948. Washington D.C.: Institute for Palestine Studies. ISBN 978-0-88728-224-9.
- Lecker, Michael (1989). "The Estates of 'Amr b. al-'Āṣ in Palestine: Notes on a New Negev Arabic Inscription". Bulletin of the School of Oriental and African Studies, University of London. 52 (1): 24–37. doi:10.1017/S0041977X00023041. JSTOR 617911. S2CID 163092638.
- Mills, E., ed. (1932). Census of Palestine 1931. Population of Villages, Towns and Administrative Areas. Jerusalem: Government of Palestine.
- Morris, Benny (2004). The Birth of the Palestinian Refugee Problem Revisited. Cambridge University Press. ISBN 978-0-521-00967-6.
- Petersen, Andrew (2001). A Gazetteer of Buildings in Muslim Palestine (British Academy Monographs in Archaeology). Vol. 1. Oxford University Press. pp. 210-213. ISBN 978-0-19-727011-0. Archived from the original on 28 May 2021.
- Socin, A. (1879). "Alphabetisches Verzeichniss von Ortschaften des Paschalik Jerusalem". Zeitschrift des Deutschen Palästina-Vereins. 2: 135–163.
- Townsend, Christopher (2006). God's War: A New History of the Crusades. Penguin Books ltd. ISBN 978-0-7139-9220-5.
