= Ni'ilya =

Ni'ilya نعليا
- Etymology: from personal name, meaning either "in the form of a horse-shoe" or from a word meaning "sterile, hard, ground"
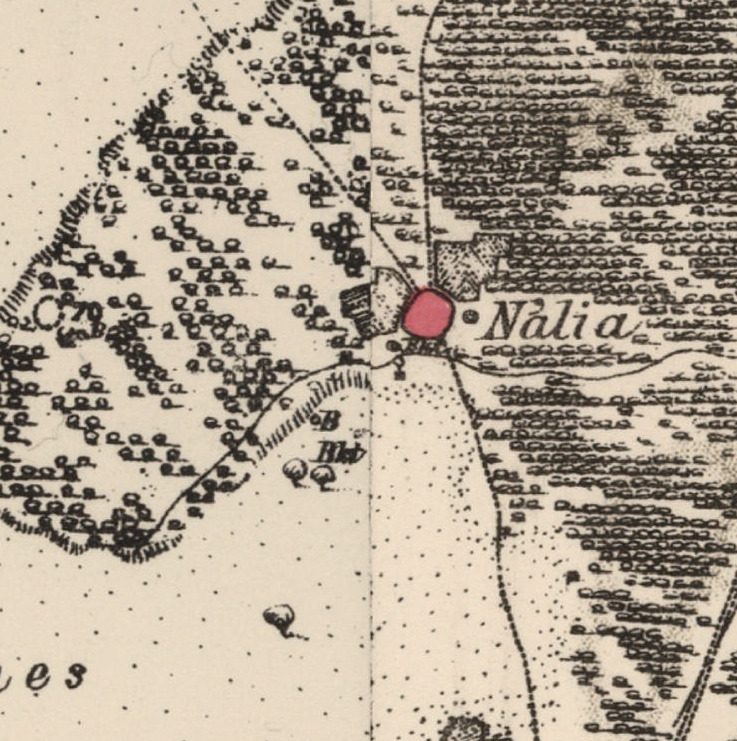
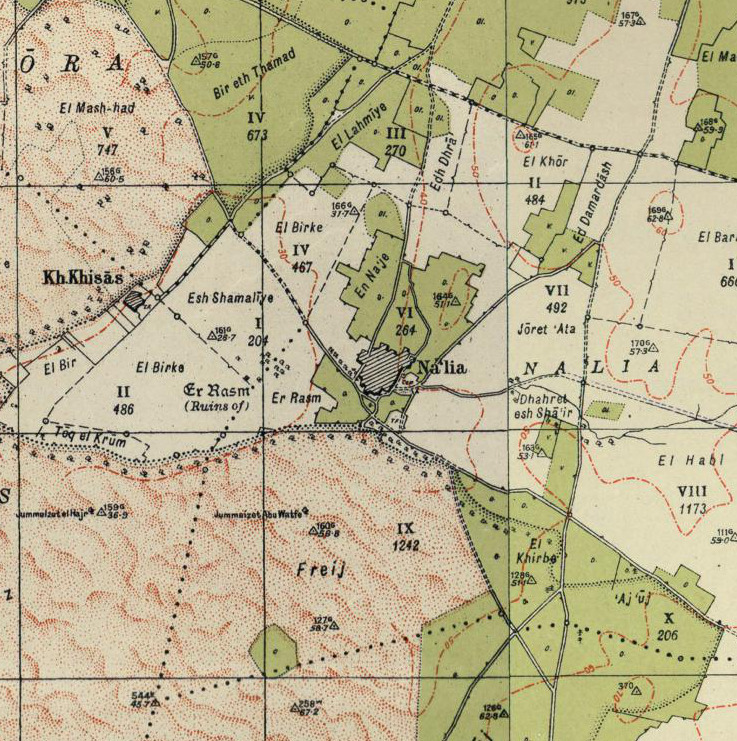
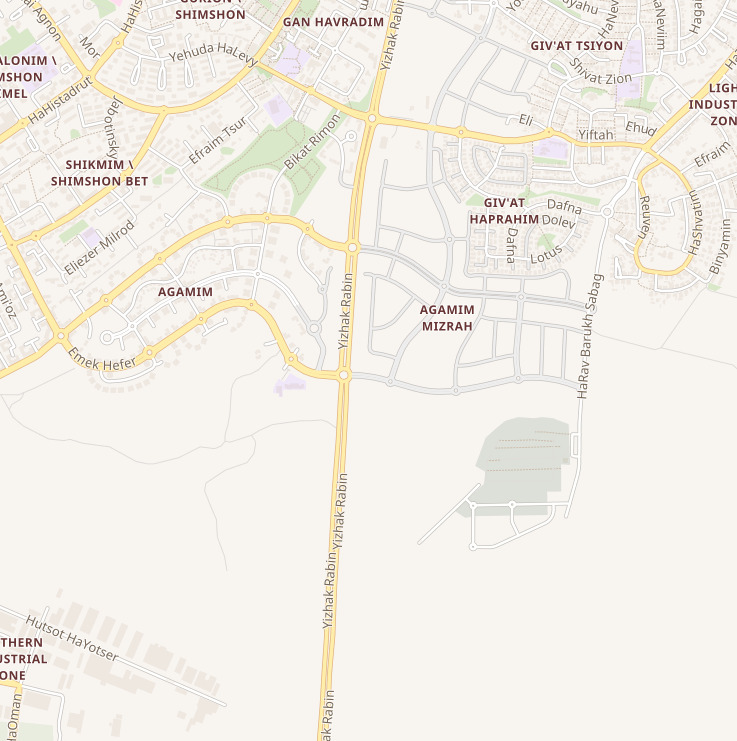
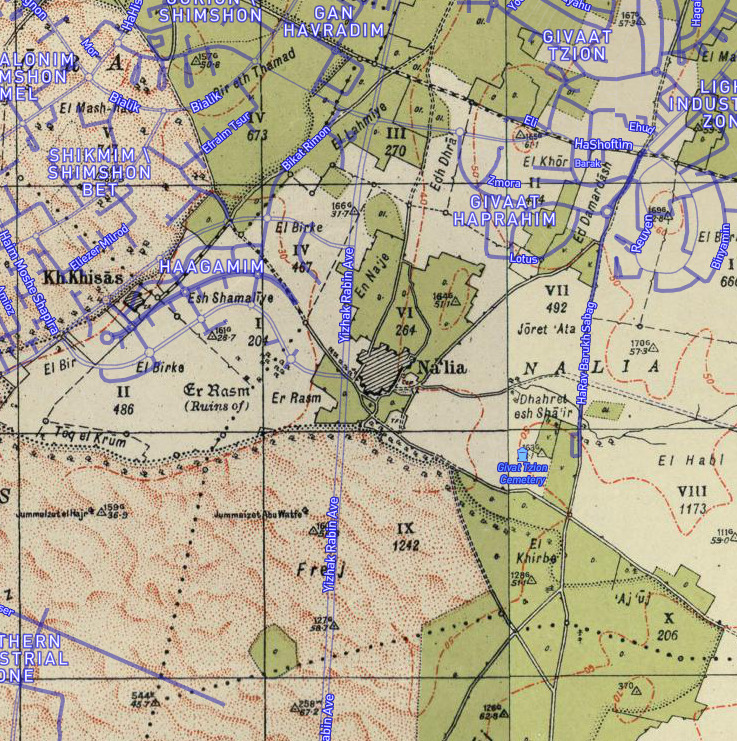
- 1870s map 1940s map modern map 1940s with modern overlay map A series of historical maps of the area around Ni'ilya (click the buttons)

- Location within Mandatory Palestine
- Coordinates: 31°38′46″N 34°34′18″E
- Palestine grid: 109/117
- Geopolitical entity: Mandatory Palestine
- Subdistrict: Gaza
- Date of depopulation: November 4–5, 1948

Area
  - Total: 5,233 dunams (5.233 km^{2}; 2.020 sq mi)

Population (1945)
  - Total: 1,310
- Cause(s) of depopulation: Military assault by Yishuv forces
- Current Localities: Ashkelon

Ni'ilya was a Palestinian village in the Gaza Subdistrict. It was depopulated during the 1948 Arab–Israeli War on November 4, 1948, under Operation Yo'av. It was located 19 km northeast of Gaza in the city territory of modern Ashkelon. The village was defended by the Egyptian Army.

== History ==
Ceramics from the Byzantine era have been found here. The village had tombs of people who were killed while battling the Crusades, according to the villagers. The local mosque had an inscription dating to 645 AH (1247 CE).

Ni'ilya was inhabited in the 15th century. Mamluk records mention its endowment as a waqf.

=== Ottoman era ===
Ni'ilya was incorporated into the Ottoman Empire in 1517 with the rest of Palestine, and according to the 1596 tax records, the village formed part of the nahiya (subdistrict) of Gaza, part of Gaza Sanjak, with a population of 70 households and 10 bachelors, or an estimated 440 people. All were Muslims. The villagers paid a fixed tax-rate of 33.3% on a number of crops, including wheat, barley, summer crops, vineyards, fruit trees, sesame, as well as on goats, beehives; a total of 20,780 akçe.

During the 17th and 18th centuries, the area of Ni'ilya experienced a significant process of settlement decline due to nomadic pressures on local communities. The residents of abandoned villages moved to surviving settlements, but the land continued to be cultivated by neighboring villages. Pierre Jacotin may have noted it as an unnamed village on his map from 1799.

In 1863 Victor Guérin found it to be a village with 300 inhabitants. The village had a mosque which contained ancient fragments, such as trunks of marble columns. An Ottoman village list from about 1870 showed that Na'lija had 39 houses and a population of 111, though the population count included men, only.

In 1883 the PEF's Survey of Western Palestine described Ni'ilya as a village resembling Barbara. They further noted: "A very extensive olive-grove extends thence to Majdal. On the south is a conspicuous white Mukam."

=== British Mandate era ===
In the 1922 census of Palestine conducted by the British Mandate authorities, Na'lia had a population of 687 inhabitants, all Muslims, while in the 1931 census, Na'lia had 169 occupied houses and a population of 893 Muslims.

In the 1930s the village mosque was inspected by Mayer from the Department of Antiquities. His report said: "Mosque on sand dune outside village on the South (see sketch plan). S. and W. walls entirely covered by sand. The mikhrab is flanked with two marble shafts and inscription on a fragment of column is placed over the column on the left side. Waqf property. The mosque is still in religious use. Inscription in ordinary writing, 8 lines, irregular height of letters. Measurement of the inscription, 0.38m (hgt) by 0.31m breadth over concave surface. Date given 645 AH (1247 CE). The inscription could not be photographed."

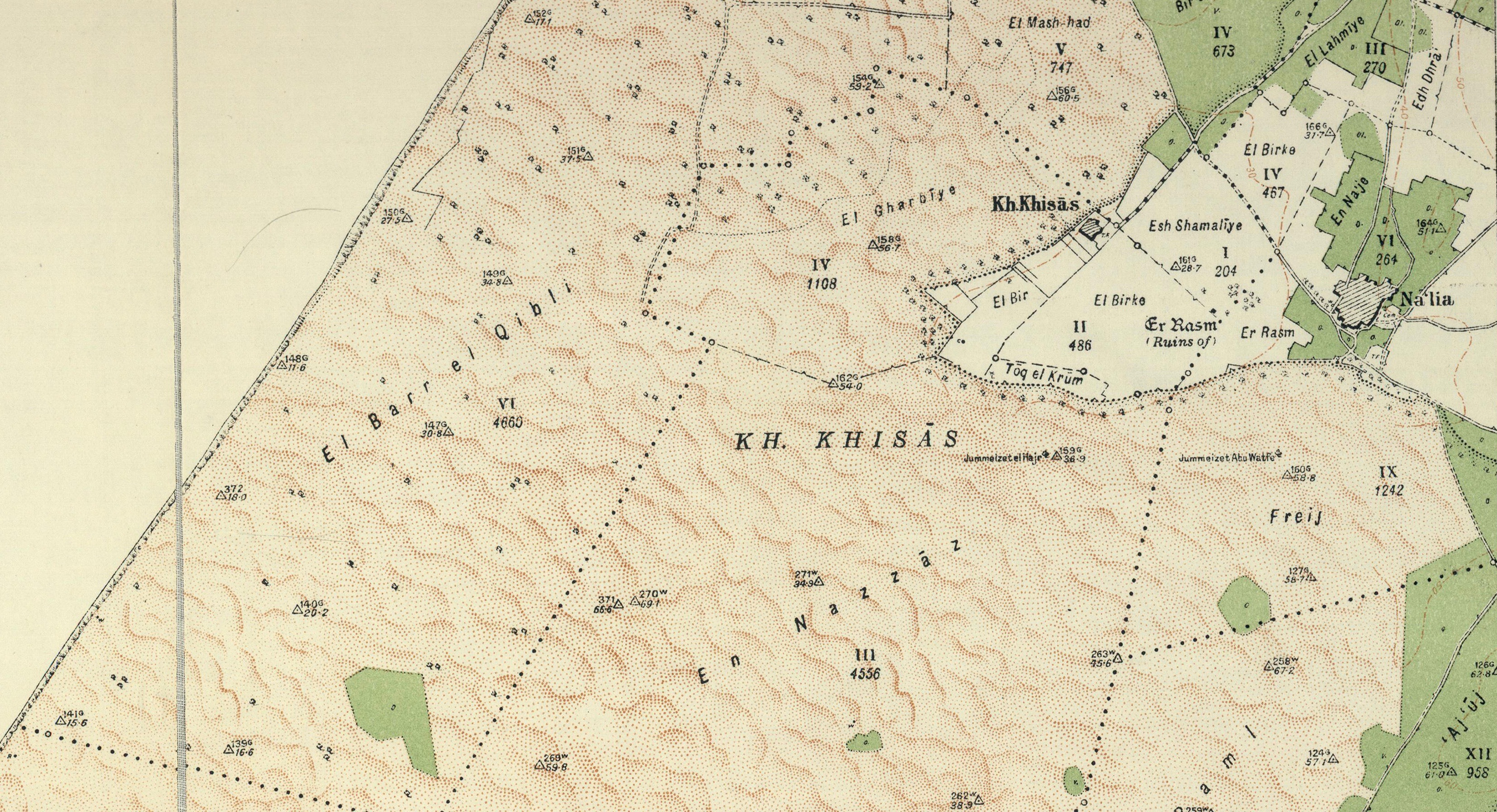
Ni'ilya 1931 1:20,000

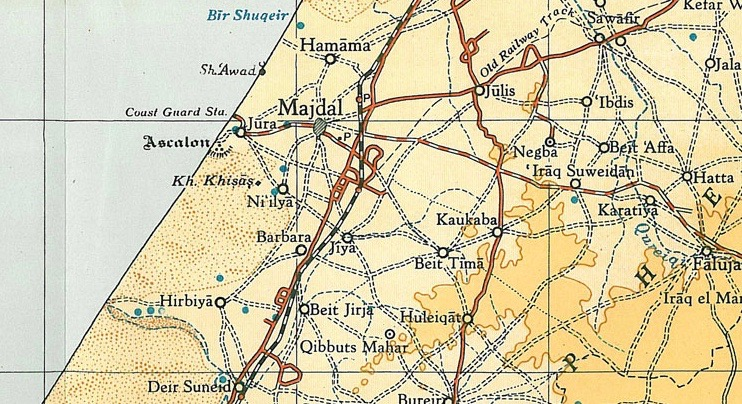
Ni'ilya 1945 1:250,000

In the 1945 statistics this had increased to 1310 Muslims, with a total of 5,233 dunams of land. Cultivated lands in the village in 1944–45 included a total of 1,084 dunums used for citrus and bananas, 2,215 dunums for cereals. An additional 1,436 dunums were irrigated or used for plantations, while 29 dunams were built-up, urban, land.

Ni'ilya students attended school in al-Majdal. A school was built in the village in 1948 shortly before the war but never opened. The village also had a mosque.

=== 1948, aftermath ===
Ni'ilya was one of the villages named in the orders to the IDF battalions and engineers platoon, that the villagers were to be expelled to Gaza, and the IDF troops were "to prevent their return by destroying their villages". The path leading to the village was to be mined. The IDF troops were ordered to carry out the operation "with determination, accuracy and energy". The operation took place on 30 November. The troops found "about 40" villagers in Barbara and al-Jiyya, "composed of women, old men and children", who offered no resistance. They were expelled to Beit Hanun, in the northern Gaza strip. Eight young men who were found were sent to a POW camp.

Since the war, Ashkelon has expanded onto village land.

In 1992, the village site was described: "The village has been obliterated, and the site is overgrown with wild plants and a few sycamore trees. One house that had probably been built in a fruit orchard still stands and is currently inhabited by a Palestinian family. It has a flat roof and rectangular windows and door. The land in the vicinity is cultivated by Israeli farmers."

Palestinian Hamas spokesman Hudayfa Samir Abdallah al-Kahlout (a.k.a. by his nome de guerra Abu Obaida) is initially from Ni'ilya prior to his family's displacement to the Gaza Strip in 1948.

== Bibliography ==
- Barron, J.B., ed. (1923). Palestine: Report and General Abstracts of the Census of 1922. Government of Palestine.
- Conder, C.R.; Kitchener, H.H. (1883). The Survey of Western Palestine: Memoirs of the Topography, Orography, Hydrography, and Archaeology. Vol. 3. London: Committee of the Palestine Exploration Fund.
- Dauphin, C. (1998). La Palestine byzantine, Peuplement et Populations. BAR International Series 726 (in French). Vol. III : Catalogue. Oxford: Archeopress. ISBN 0-860549-05-4.
- Department of Statistics (1945). Village Statistics, April, 1945. Government of Palestine.
- Guérin, V. (1869). Description Géographique Historique et Archéologique de la Palestine (in French). Vol. 1: Judee, pt. 2. Paris: L'Imprimerie Nationale.
- Hadawi, S. (1970). Village Statistics of 1945: A Classification of Land and Area ownership in Palestine. Palestine Liberation Organization Research Center.
- Hartmann, M. (1883). "Die Ortschaftenliste des Liwa Jerusalem in dem türkischen Staatskalender für Syrien auf das Jahr 1288 der Flucht (1871)". Zeitschrift des Deutschen Palästina-Vereins. 6: 102–149.
- Hütteroth, W.-D.; Abdulfattah, K. (1977). Historical Geography of Palestine, Transjordan and Southern Syria in the Late 16th Century. Erlanger Geographische Arbeiten, Sonderband 5. Erlangen, Germany: Vorstand der Fränkischen Geographischen Gesellschaft. ISBN 3-920405-41-2.
- Karmon, Y. (1960). "An Analysis of Jacotin's Map of Palestine" (PDF). Israel Exploration Journal. 10 (3, 4): 155–173, 244–253. Archived from the original (PDF) on 2019-12-22.
- Khalidi, W. (1992). All That Remains: The Palestinian Villages Occupied and Depopulated by Israel in 1948. Washington D.C.: Institute for Palestine Studies. ISBN 0-88728-224-5.
- Mills, E., ed. (1932). Census of Palestine 1931. Population of Villages, Towns and Administrative Areas. Jerusalem: Government of Palestine.
- Morris, B. (2004). The Birth of the Palestinian Refugee Problem Revisited. Cambridge University Press. ISBN 978-0-521-00967-6.
- Palmer, E.H. (1881). The Survey of Western Palestine: Arabic and English Name Lists Collected During the Survey by Lieutenants Conder and Kitchener, R. E. Transliterated and Explained by E.H. Palmer. Committee of the Palestine Exploration Fund.
- Petersen, Andrew (2001). A Gazetteer of Buildings in Muslim Palestine (British Academy Monographs in Archaeology). Vol. I. Oxford University Press. ISBN 978-0-19-727011-0. Archived from the original on 2021-05-28.
- Socin, A. (1879). "Alphabetisches Verzeichniss von Ortschaften des Paschalik Jerusalem". Zeitschrift des Deutschen Palästina-Vereins. 2: 135–163.

== See also ==
- Welcome To Ni'ilya
- Ni'ilya, Zochrot
- Survey of Western Palestine, Map 20: IAA, Wikimedia commons
- Ni'ilya from the Khalil Sakakini Cultural Center
