= Postřekov =

- Municipality
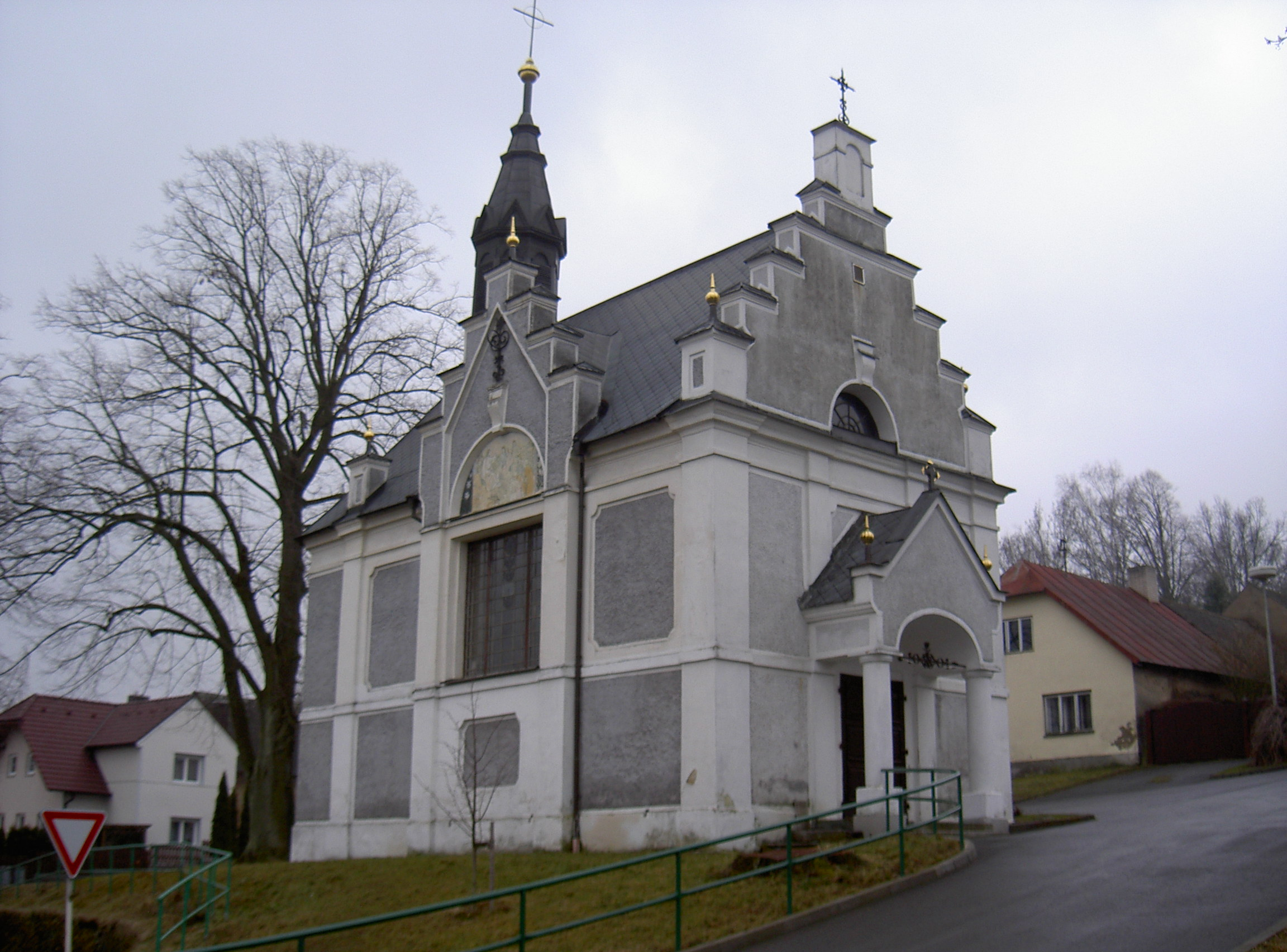
- Church of Saint James the Great

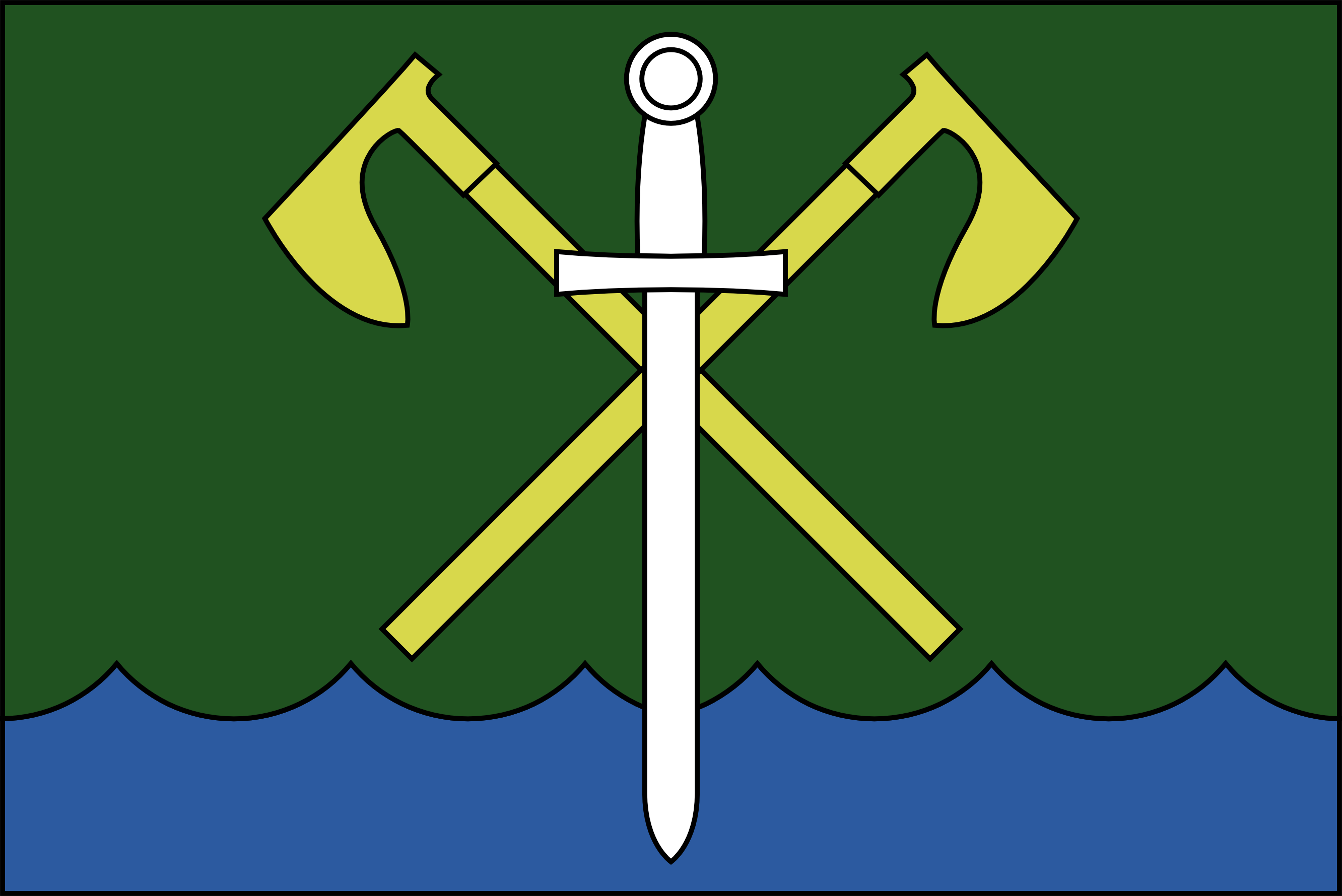
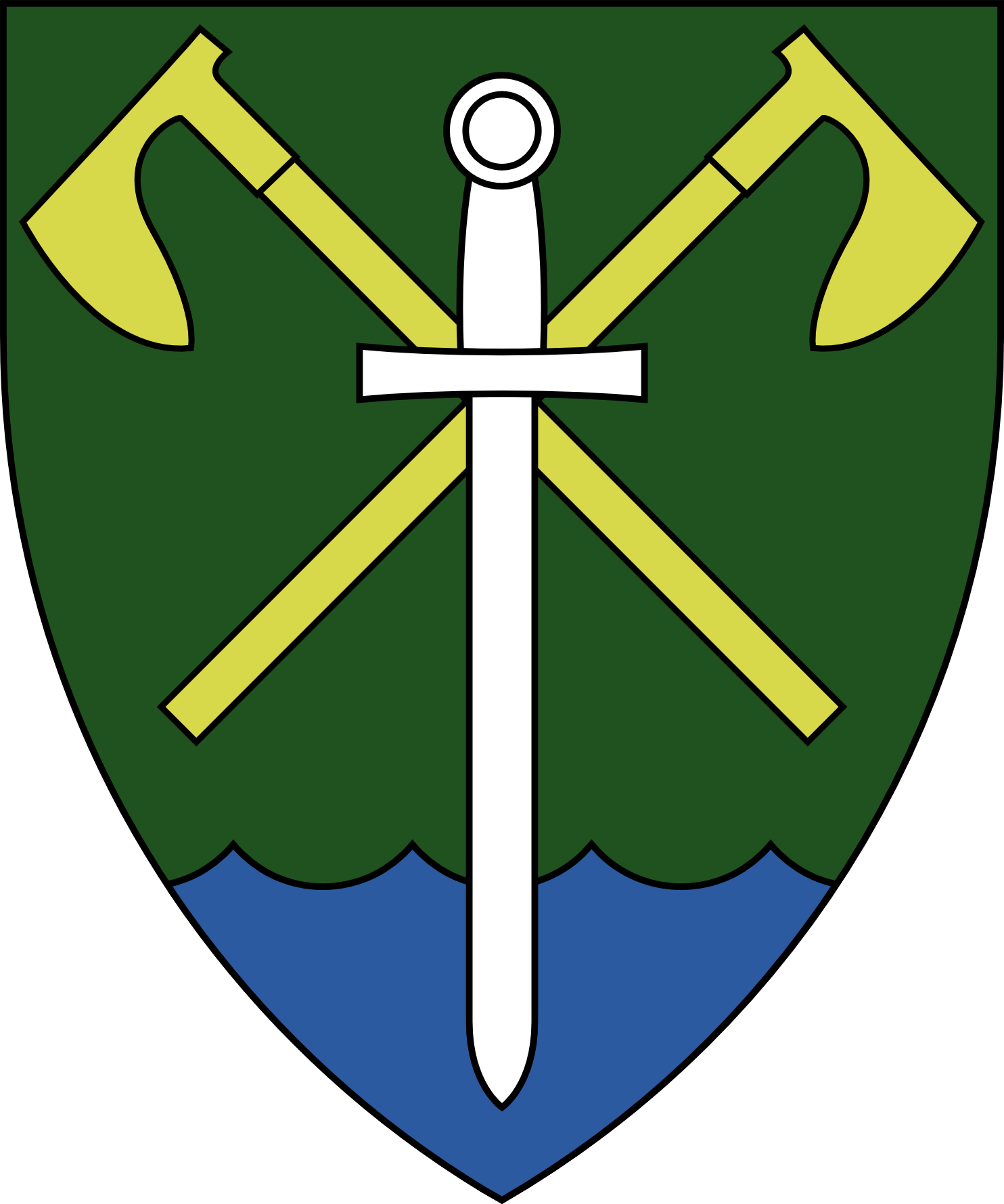
- Flag Coat of arms

- Location in the Czech Republic
- Coordinates: 49°27′14″N 12°47′58″E
- Country: Czech Republic
- Region: Plzeň
- District: Domažlice
- First mentioned: 1325

Area
  - Total: 18.89 km^{2} (7.29 sq mi)
- Elevation: 470 m (1,540 ft)

Population (2026-01-01)
  - Total: 1,102
  - Density: 58.34/km^{2} (151.1/sq mi)
- Time zone: UTC+1 (CET)
  - Summer (DST): UTC+2 (CEST)
- Postal code: 345 35
- Website: www.obecpostrekov.cz

Postřekov is a municipality and village in the Domažlice District in the Plzeň Region of the Czech Republic. It has about 1,100 inhabitants.

Postřekov lies approximately 10 kilometres (6 mi) west of Domažlice, 53 km (33 mi) south-west of Plzeň, and 137 km (85 mi) south-west of Prague.

== Administrative division ==
Postřekov consists of two municipal parts (in brackets population according to the 2021 census):

- Postřekov (914)
- Mlýnec (149)

== Demographics ==
Historical population
Year	Pop.	±%
1869	1,473	—
1880	1,498	+1.7%
1890	1,547	+3.3%
1900	1,672	+8.1%
1910	1,848	+10.5%
1921	1,706	−7.7%
1930	1,554	−8.9%
1950	1,003	−35.5%
1961	1,138	+13.5%
1970	1,202	+5.6%
1980	1,230	+2.3%
1991	1,176	−4.4%
2001	1,131	−3.8%
2011	1,092	−3.4%
2021	1,063	−2.7%
Source: Censuses

== Twin towns – sister cities ==
Postřekov is twinned with:

- Ascha, Germany
- Pakrac, Croatia
