= Benjelloun =

Benjelloun, Ben Jelloun or Bengelloun (Arabic: بن جلون, romanized: bin Jallūn, or بنجلون, Binjallūn) is a common Moroccan surname. It may refer to:

- Abdelmajid Benjelloun (1919–1981), Moroccan novelist, journalist and ambassador
- Abdelmajid Benjelloun (born 1944), Moroccan writer, poet and historian, specialist in the history of northern Morocco
- Abdessalam Benjelloun (born 1985), Moroccan footballer
- Ahmed Benjelloun (1942–2015), Moroccan politician, founder and leader of the Socialist Democratic Vanguard Party
- Hassan Benjelloun (born 1950), Moroccan screenwriter, director and producer
- Leïla Mezian Benjelloun, Moroccan physician and businesswoman
- Omar Benjelloun (1936–1975), Moroccan politician, leader of the Socialist Union of Popular Forces
- Othman Benjelloun (born 1932), Moroccan businessman and billionaire
- Samir Bengelloun (born 1985), French footballer
- Tahar Ben Jelloun (born 1944), Moroccan writer and poet
- Tarik Bengelloun (born 1991), French footballer
- Youness Bengelloun (born 1983), French footballer.

== See also ==
- Lists of most common surnames
