= Minbar of the Mosque of the Andalusians =

Historic art object in Morocco

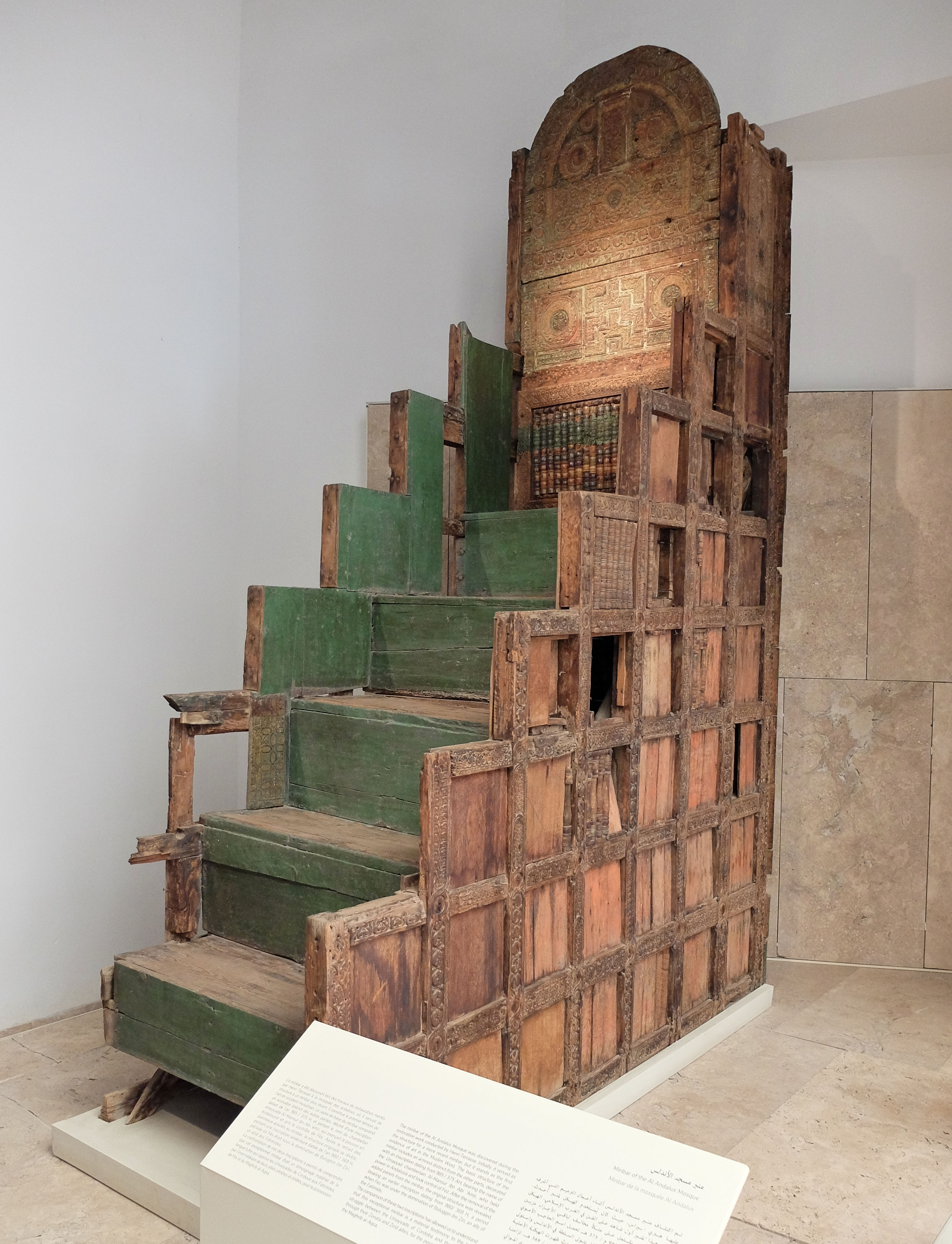
Overall view of the 10th-century minbar on display at the Dar Batha Museum in Fez

The minbar of the Mosque of the Andalusians in Fez, Morocco is a historic Islamic pulpit made of wood. It is the oldest surviving minbar in Morocco and one of the oldest minbars from the western part of the historic Islamic world. It was originally crafted circa 980 CE on the orders of the Fatimid-aligned Zirid commander Buluggin, before being significantly reworked five years later on the orders of an Umayyad commander sent by the vizier al-Mansur. This 10th-century work was partially covered up by new wooden panels during another restoration in the early 13th century by the Almohads.

The earlier woodwork was rediscovered during a modern restoration in the 20th century, at which time the 10th-century pieces were removed from the mosque's current minbar and reassembled separately. These original pieces feature carved relief decoration with vegetal, geometric, and epigraphic motifs, as well as some very early use of the woodturning technique that would later feature prominently in the mashrabiyas commonly seen in Islamic art and architecture. They are now on display in the Dar Batha Museum of Islamic Arts in Fez.

== History ==
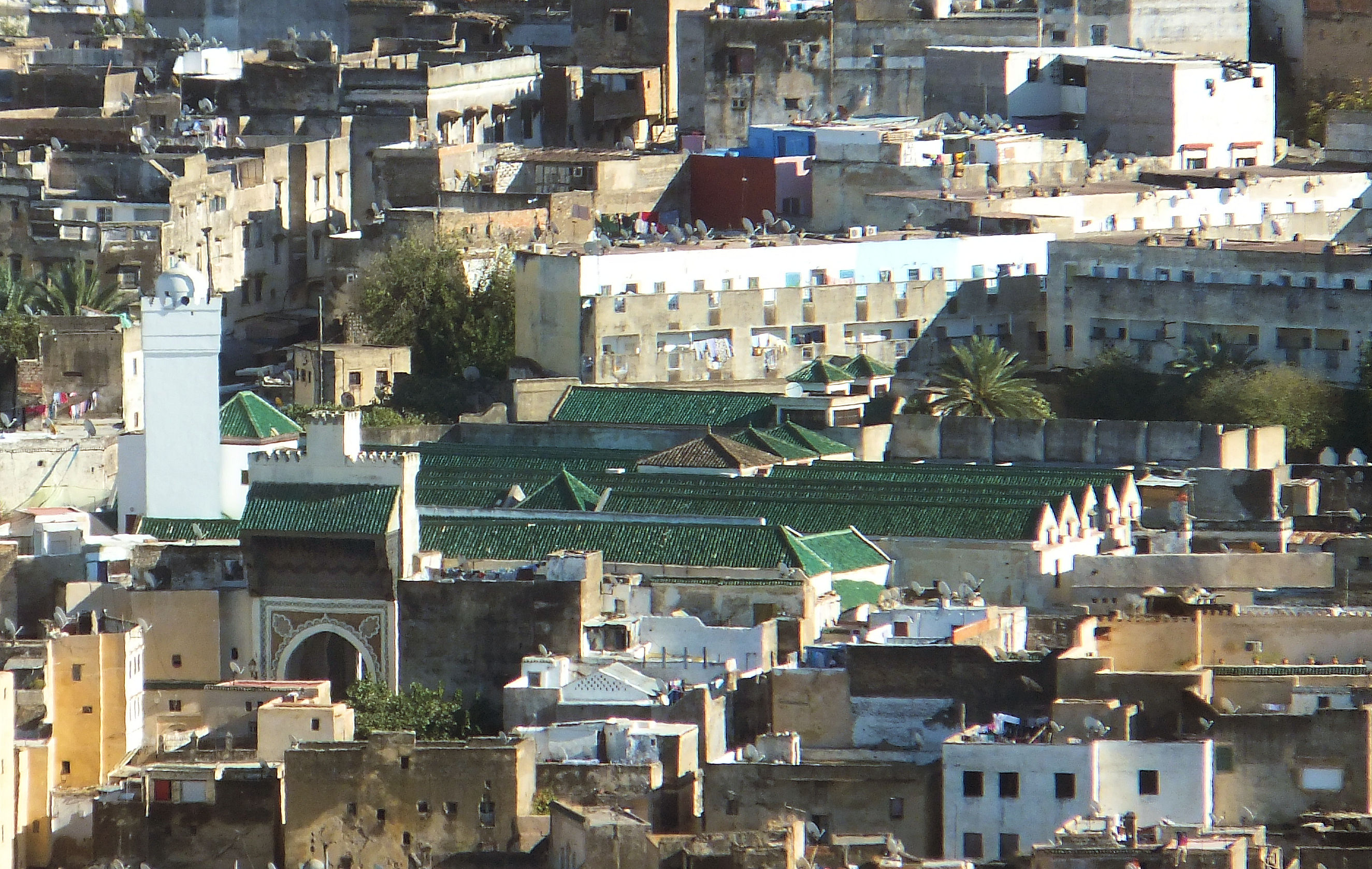
View of the present-day Mosque of the Andalusians in Fez (distinguished by its green-tiled roof and its white minaret on the left)

In the 10th century, control of Fez and the western Maghreb region was repeatedly disputed between the Fatimid caliphs in North Africa and the Umayyad caliphs of al-Andalus (in present-day Spain). In 980, the region was invaded by Buluggin, a Zirid amir who ruled on behalf of the Fatimid caliphs, he commissioned a new minbar for the Mosque of the Andalusians in Fez, one of the city's major mosques. This act symbolized the victory of the Shi'a Fatimids over other factions like the Sunni Umayyads of Cordoba. An inscription with this date — 369 AH, corresponding to 980 CE — has been preserved on one of the minbar's original panels, rediscovered in the 20th century by the French scholar Henri Terrasse during a restoration project.

In 985, Ibn 'Abi Amir al-Mansur, the vizier of Caliph Hisham II and de facto ruler of Cordoba, sent his cousin Askalaja with an army to retake Fez and northern Morocco directly. Within a few months after successfully capturing Fez, the minbar was partly re-crafted with new parts in a very similar artistic style, including an upper section (the backrest) with an inscription recording the date of 375 AH (985 or 986 CE) and the names of Ibn 'Abi Amir and Hisham II. Presumably, the components which identified the minbar as Fatimid were deliberately removed and replaced with Umayyad components. Terrasse suggested that the earlier inscription of 369 AH (which does not include any names) was left in place at the time because the local craftsmen, who may not have been able to read Kufic well, might not have realized its significance.

In the early 13th century, the Almohad caliph Muhammad al-Nasir undertook a major restoration and reconstruction of the mosque between 1203 and 1207. Around this time, he also ordered the renovation of the old minbar, which by then was in poor condition. Once again, rather than replacing the minbar entirely, the Almohads opted to restore and reuse the old one. Most of the minbar, especially its sides, were covered with new wooden panels decorated in the Moorish style of this period, strongly influenced by Andalusi craftsmanship. The upper back panel, however, which featured inscriptions from the 10th-century Umayyad restoration, was preserved in place, perhaps indicating a certain respect the Almohads held for the former Caliphate of Cordoba.

During Henri Terrasse's restoration of the mosque in the 20th century, he noticed that the backrest of the minbar was of different style from the rest of the Almohad craftwork and that it was inscribed with the name of the Umayyad vizier al-Mansur, marking it as older than the Almohad period. He removed the Almohad panels to reveal the older minbar underneath, which was then reassembled on a separate wooden armature. The Almohad minbar was retained and remains in use at the Mosque of the Andalusians, while the original Fatimid and Umayyad pieces are now on display together in the Dar Batha Museum in Fez.

== Description ==
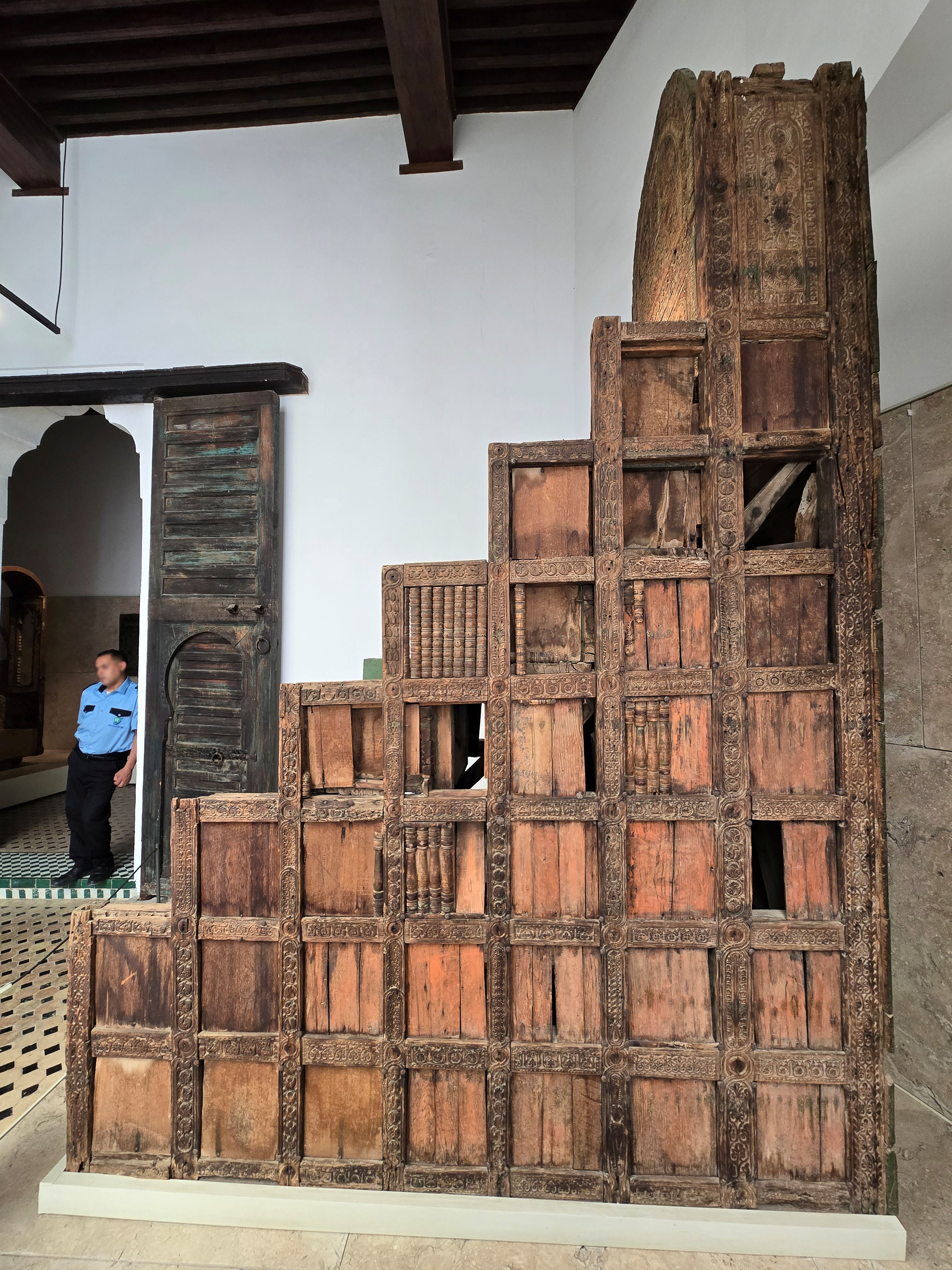
Side view of the minbar, showing the flank and some of the few surviving square panels

The minbar is made entirely of wood and consists of a staircase with triangular flanks. The minbar appears to have room for six steps today, but according to Henri Terrasse it probably had seven steps originally and the lowest step was likely lost during the later Almohad renovation. The flanks of the minbar are composed of long vertical wooden beams tied together with shorter horizontal beams, which together form a grid of squares. These squares were filled with panels of different designs: some consisted of a row of mini balusters of turned wood fitted closely together, some were made of similar half-balusters nailed to a board, and some were solid panels carved with shallow relief decoration similar to the backrest panels. The vertical and horizontal beams between the squares are also carved with shallow relief decoration which can still be seen today.

The original Fatimid/Zirid minbar was probably covered with relief-decorated panels, but only two of these have survived to the present day, out of sixty-eight. According to Terrasse, the majority of them were probably damaged or lost during the Umayyad siege of Fez in 985 and during the subsequent renovation of the minbar. The panels of turned wood were most likely created during the Umayyad restoration. Terrasse suggested that these were employed because they were cheaper and faster to manufacture than new relief panels, though it is unclear if other influences may have been at play.

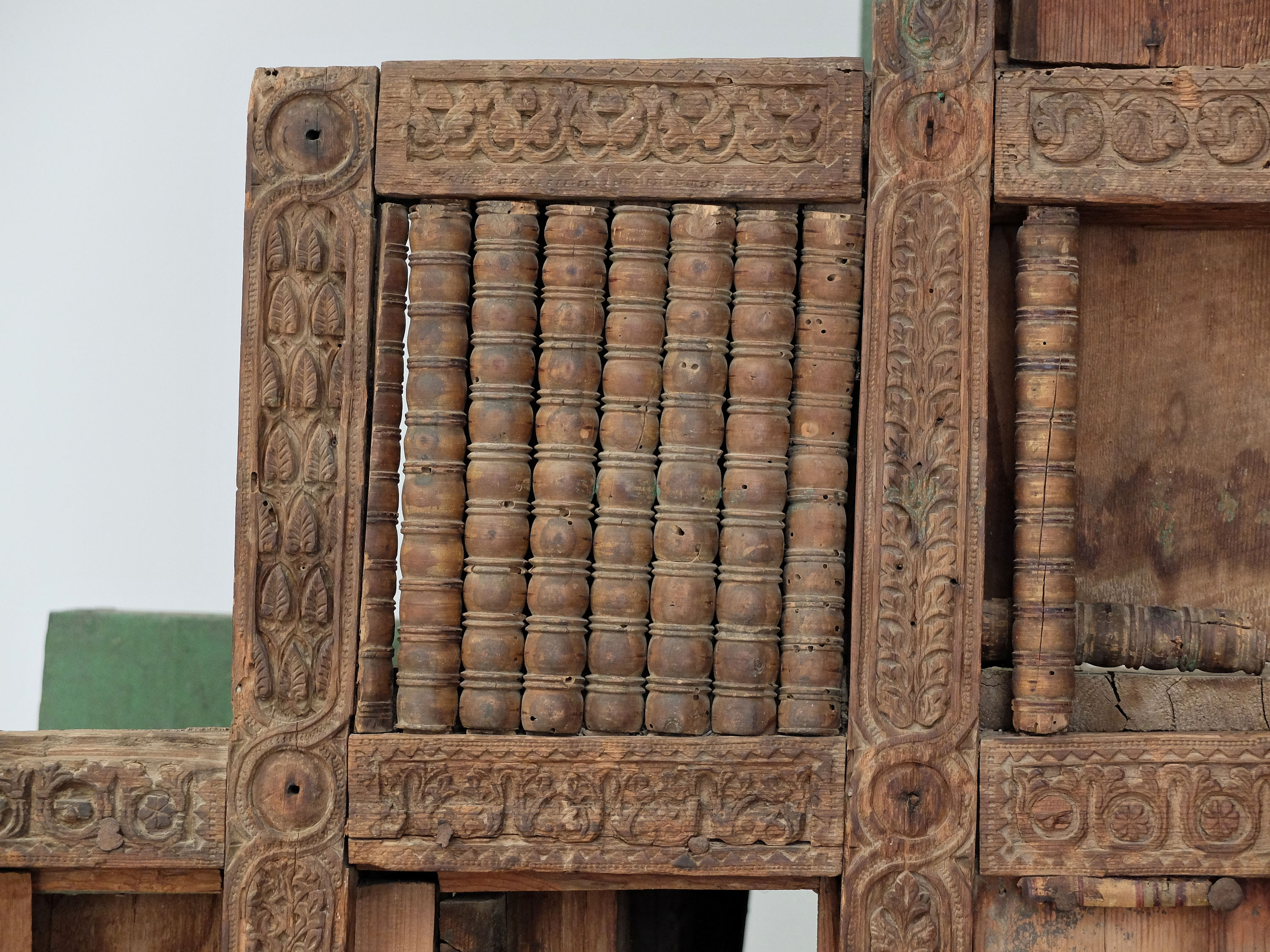
Closer view of one of the square panels filled with small turned wood balustrades and the supporting frame around it decorated with carved reliefs of vegetal motifs

The carved relief decoration on the minbar is composed of stylized vegetal and geometric motifs that appear to be derived from the ornamental designs of earlier 8th-century Islamic art, which reflected late antique Byzantine and Sasanian art. It also shows influence from decoration of the earlier 9th-century minbar of the Great Mosque of Kairouan. The turned wood balusters, on the other hand, are unique in the decoration of historic minbars. They are also one of the earliest known examples of this type of woodwork using the bow drill technique, which later became characteristic of mashrabiyas in the Middle East, a common style of woodwork in Islamic art.

The panels that make up the backrest of the minbar are larger and, with one exception, are decorated entirely with carved relief motifs similar to those of the smaller pieces. The two panels on the sides of the backrest are likely from the original Fatimid minbar and feature rosettes and vegetal motifs such as pinecones, as well as an inscription in Kufic Arabic latters in an arched frame. The latter reflect the same trends of contemporary epigraphic art in the Middle East. One of the inscriptions on these side panels includes the date of Buluggin's commission in 369 AH (980 CE), while the other panel is inscribed with the Basmala and Qur'anic verse 24:35. However, the name of Buluggin himself is not found on any surviving inscriptions, presumably because it was on one of the backrest panels removed by the Umayyads in 985. The other panels of the backrest, facing forward towards the stairs, all date from the Umayyad intervention. These Umayyad panels are very similar in style and motif to the Fatimid panels (Note: Although these forward-facing panels are slightly more worn and their decorative details more dull, possibly because they were never covered up and thus have been subjected to constant wear over the centuries.) and were possibly commissioned from the same artisan(s) who crafted the Fatimid minbar years earlier. In addition to the relief decoration, the lower of the three panels also features a rectangular zone filled with turned wood balustrades. An inscription running across the edges of two of the panels records the name of al-Mansur and of the Umayyad caliph Hisham II. The date of this inscription is partly worn away but most likely refers to the year 375 AH (985 CE), the year of the Umayyad capture of Fez.

The backrest panels

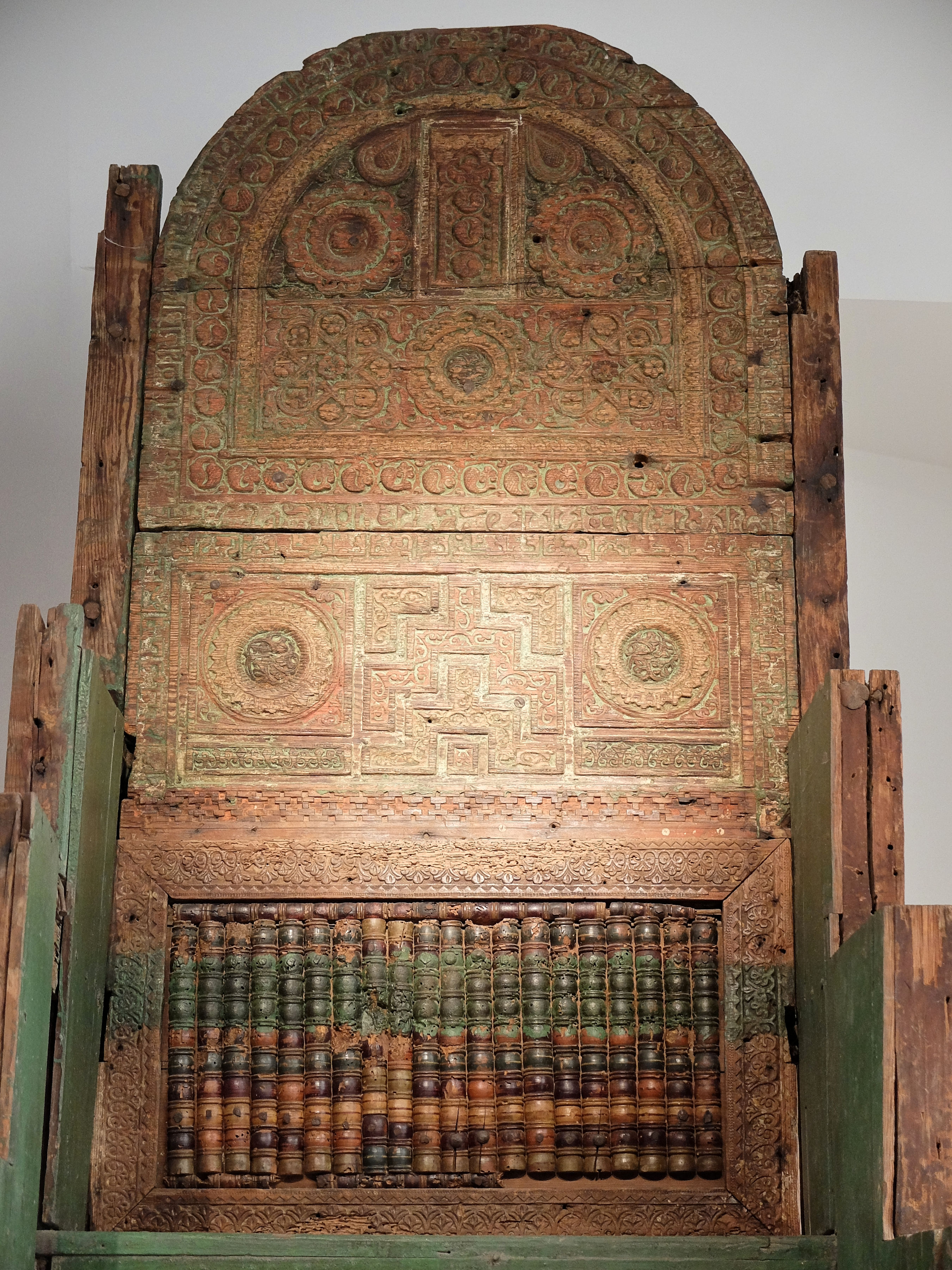
The backrest of the minbar

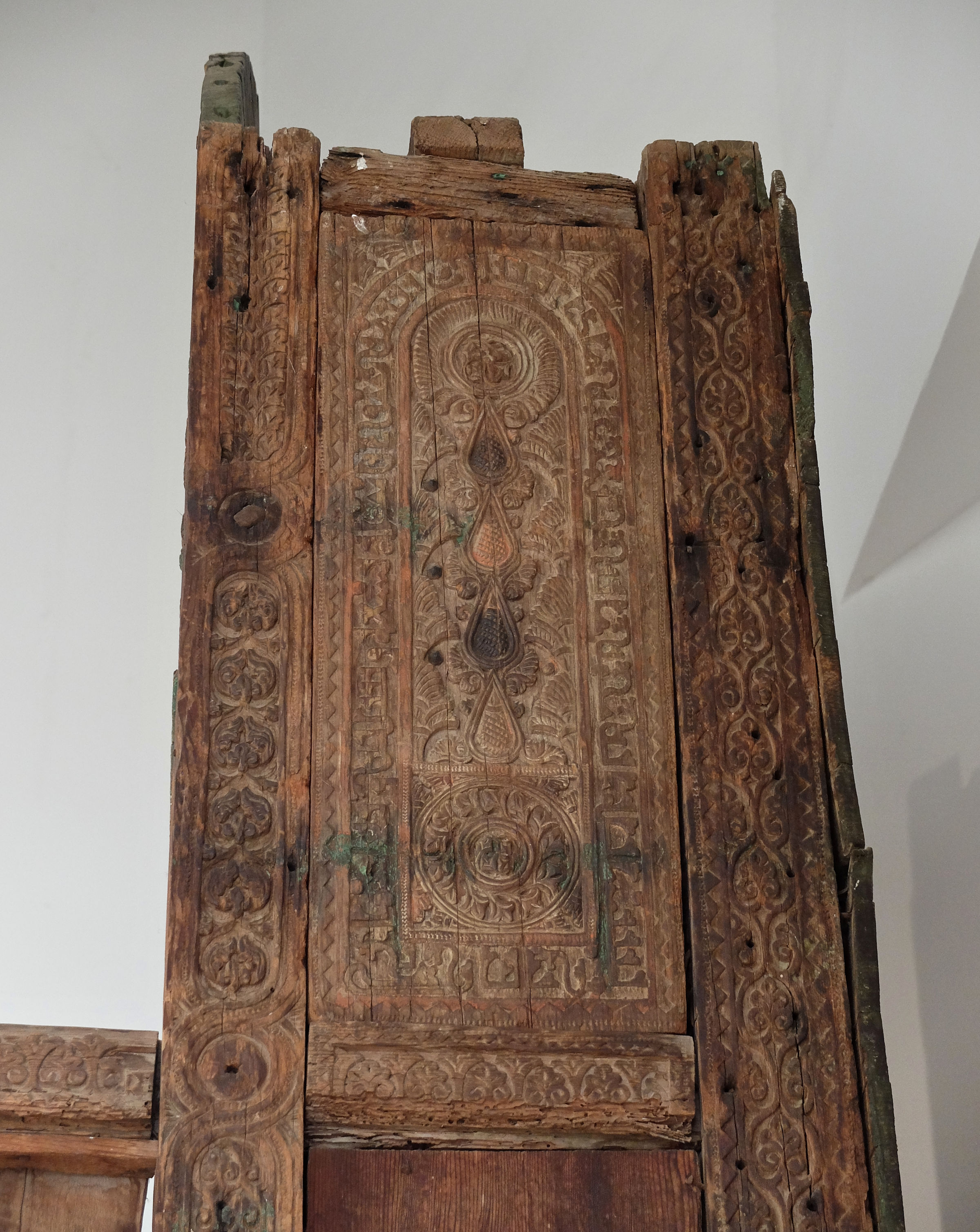
One of the two side panels of the backrest, dating from the original Fatimid minbar (980 CE)

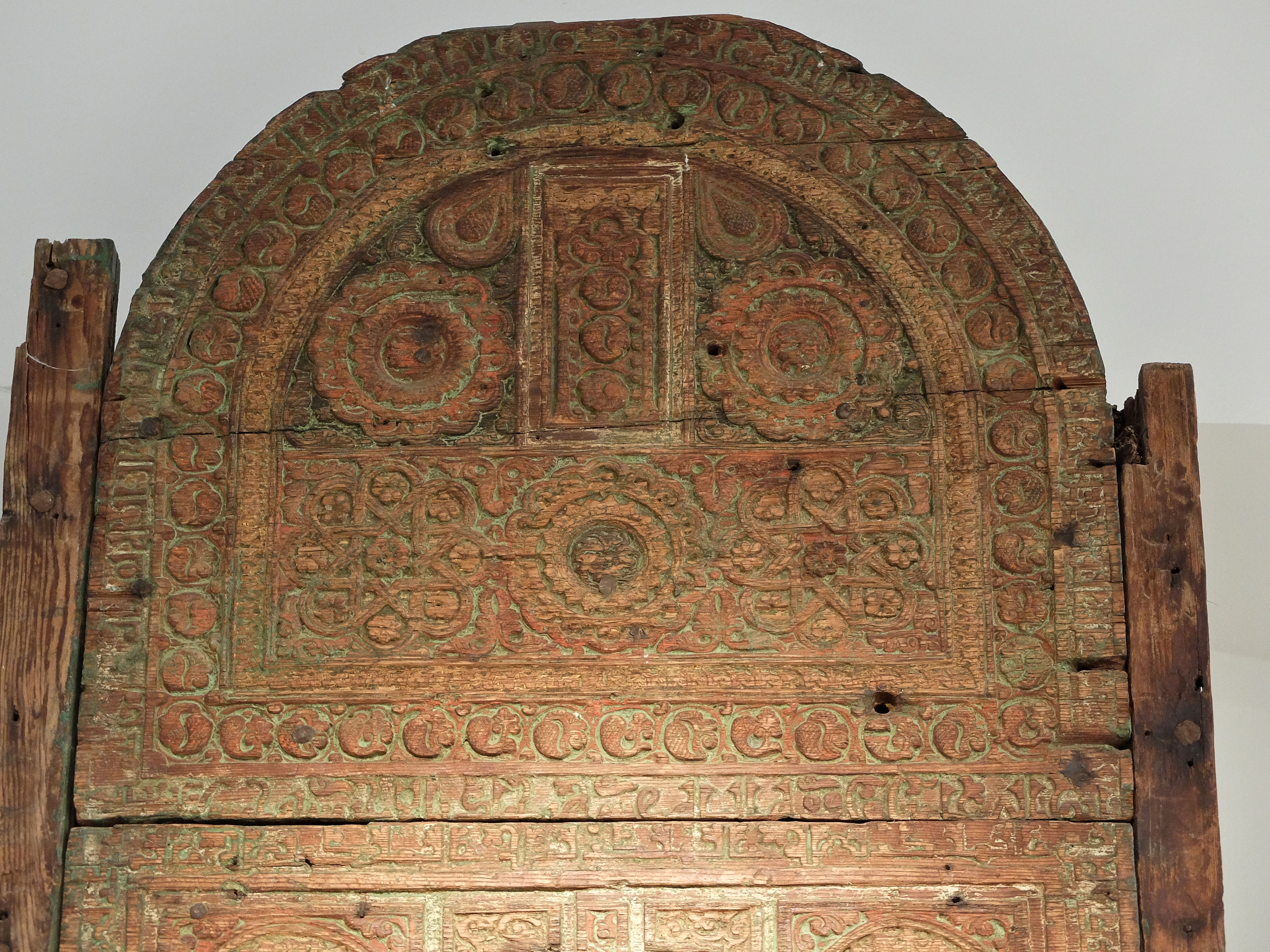
Upper panel of the backrest, dating from the Umayyad renovation (985 CE)

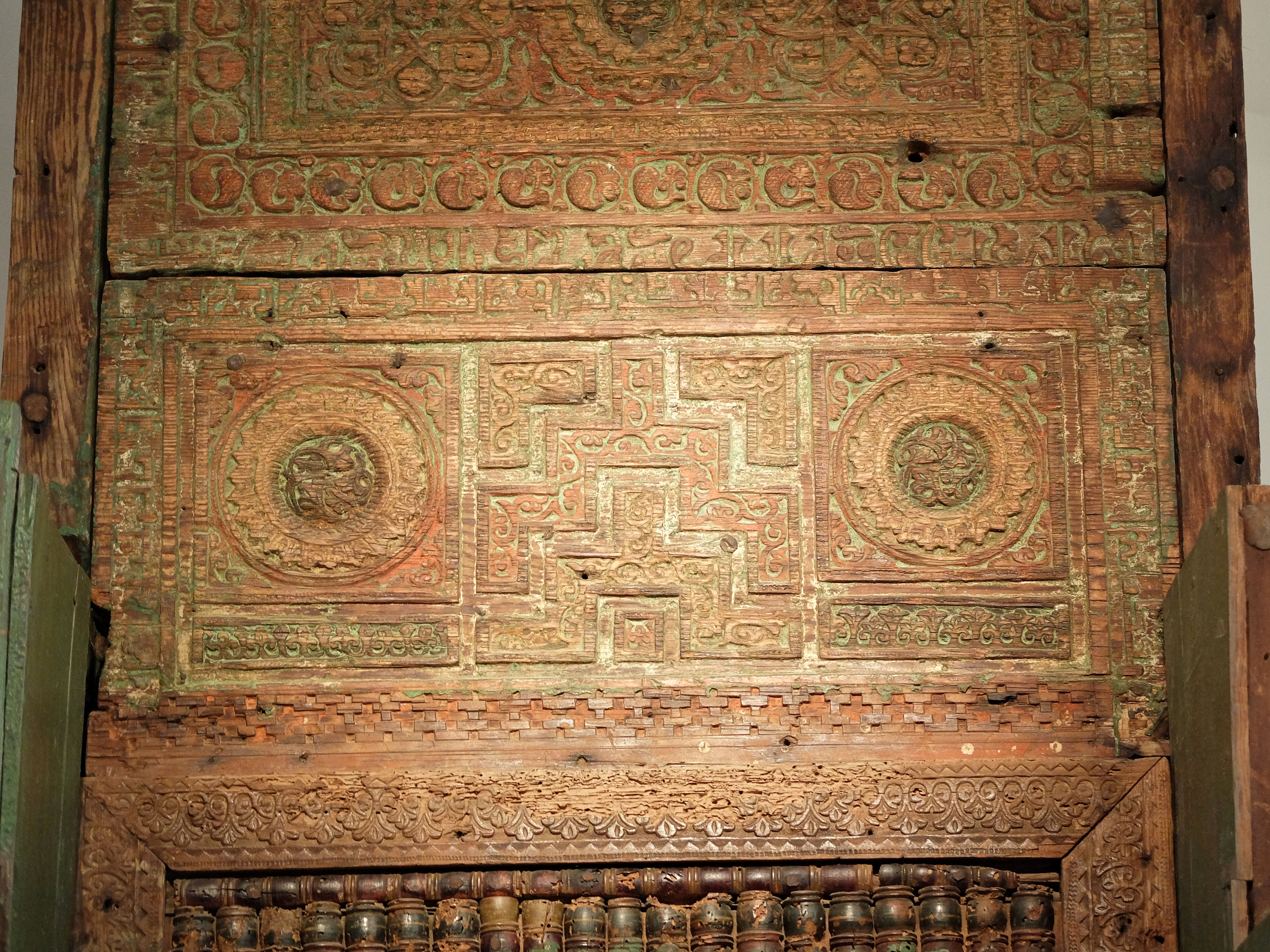
Middle panel of the backrest, dating from the Umayyad renovation

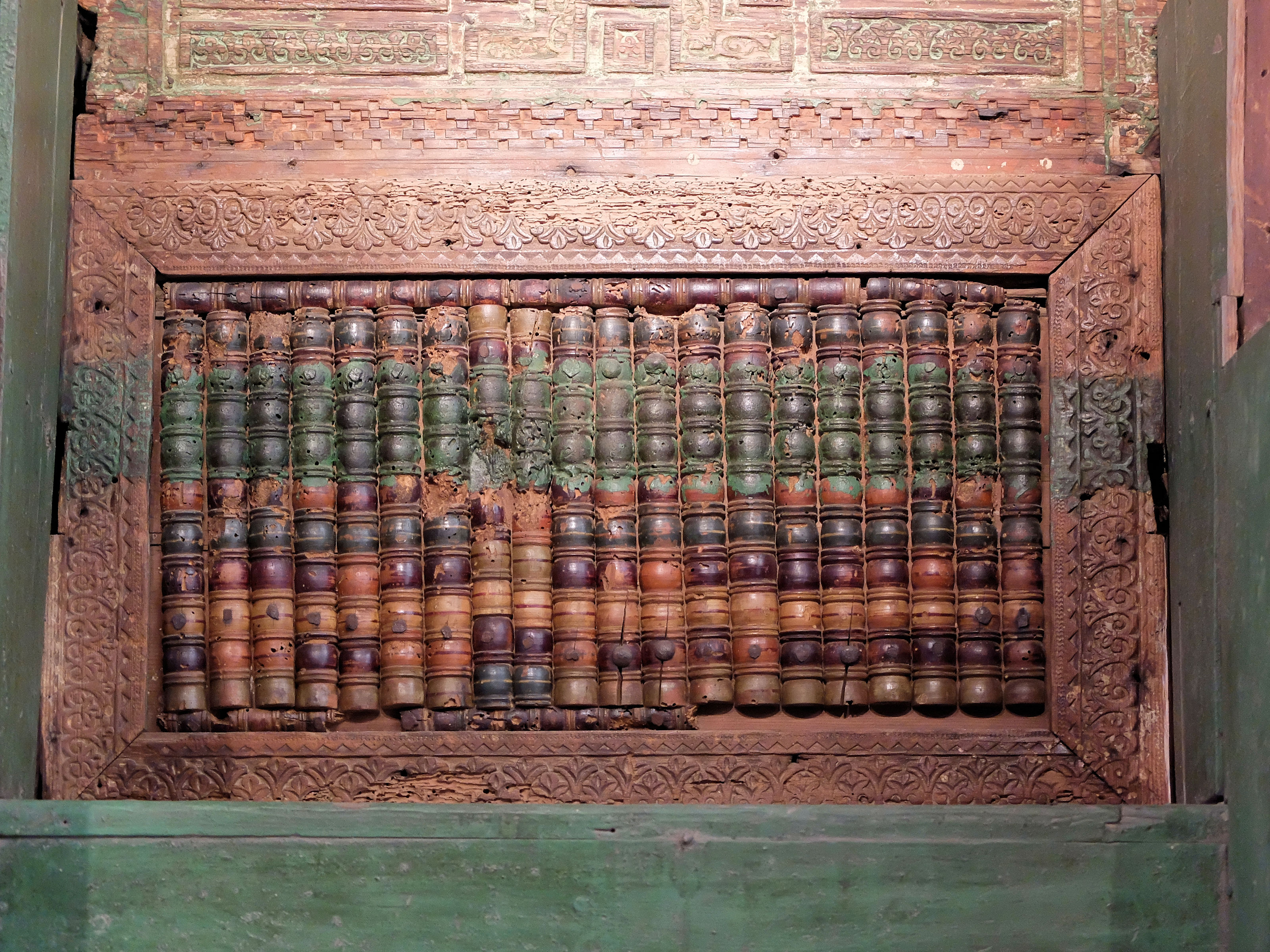
Lower panel of the backrest, likely also dating from the Umayyad renovation

== See also ==
- Minbar of the Kutubiyya Mosque
