= Al-Anouar Mosque =

Former historic mosque in Fez, Morocco

- جامع الأنوار
- Morocco

Religion
- Affiliation: Sunni Islam

Location
- Location: Fez, Morocco
- Coordinates: 34°03′51.6″N 4°58′3.2″W

Architecture
- Type: Mosque
- Founder: Idris I
- Established: 808

The Al-Anouar Mosque (Arabic: جامع الأنوار, romanized: jama' al-anwar, lit. 'Mosque of the Lights'), formerly also known as the Mosque of the Sheikhs (Arabic: جامع الأشياخ, romanized: jama' al-ashiakh, "Mosque of the Chiefs"), was the oldest mosque in Fez, Morocco. It was founded by Idris I at the same time as he founded the city itself, in the early 9th century. It was located slightly northeast of the current Mosque of the Andalusians, which surpassed it as the main mosque of the area. Today only remnants of the mosque have survived.

== History ==
The mosque was the first mosque founded by Idris I, in 808 CE, (Note: This is the date of Fes's founding according to some accounts; others put it a little earlier, to 789, meaning the mosque could have been founded at this time too.) when he founded Madinat Fas, the first city of what became Fez, centered on what is now the Andalous or 'Adoua quarter (on the eastern shore of the Bou Khrareb River). The mosque was built next to a well where the sheikhs (chiefs) of the Berber tribes allied to Idris held their meetings (hence the name "Mosque of the Sheikhs"). It had no minaret and did not have a particularly monumental appearance. The name "Al-Anouar" or "Al-Anwar" was an epithet sometimes given to Idris I, which is why the mosque also took on this name.

The mosque was eventually overshadowed and eclipsed by the Mosque of the Andalusians, founded nearby in 859–860, which quickly grew larger than the relatively primitive early Idrisid mosque. In 933, on the order of Hamid ibn Hamdan al-Hamdani the governor of Fez on behalf of the Fatimids, the khutba (Friday sermon) was transferred from the Mosque of the Sheikhs to the Andalusian Mosque, thus denoting the latter as the main mosque of the district. (At the same time, on the opposite bank of the river, the khutba was transferred from the Mosque of the Sharifs, the later Zawiya of Idris II, to the Qarawiyyin Mosque.)

In the centuries since then, the Mosque of the Sheikhs has survived only as a small prayer space which has been significantly changed by subsequent repairs. A minor structure still stands on the site today, but only vestiges and archaeological remains of the original mosque have survived.

In August 2024, the ADER-Fès agency (a government-affiliated organisation dedicated to conservation in the city) announced that it was planning to carry out a restoration project at the site of the mosque's remains.
