= Mosque of the Andalusians =

Mosque in Fez, Morocco

- جامع الأندلسيين
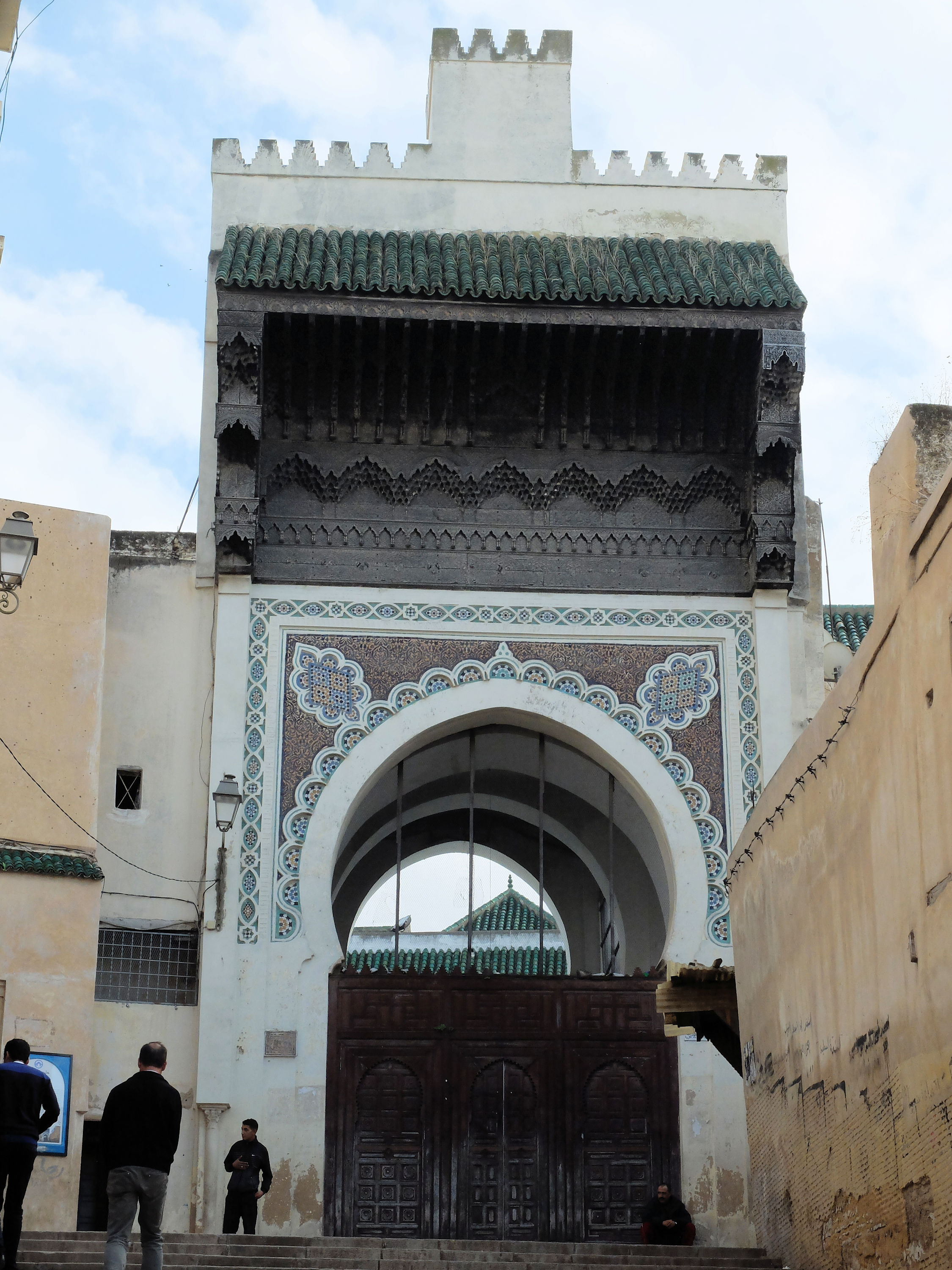
- Main entrance portal of the mosque (north side)

Religion
- Sect: Sunni Islam

Location
- Location: Fes, Morocco
- Interactive map of Mosque of the Andalusians
- Coordinates: 34°03′47.5″N 4°58′5.6″W

Architecture
- Type: Mosque
- Style: Moorish (Almohad, Alawi)
- Established: 859–60
- Completed: 956 (minaret); 1207 (reconstruction of main building)
- Minaret: 1

The Mosque of the Andalusians or Al-Andalusiyyin Mosque (Arabic: جامع الأندلسيين, romanized: Jama' al-Andalusiyyin), sometimes also called the Andalusian Mosque, is a major historic mosque in Fes el Bali, the old medina quarter of Fez, Morocco. The mosque was founded in 859–860, making it one of the oldest mosques in Morocco. It is located at the heart of a district which was historically associated with Andalusi immigrants, from which it takes its name. It has been renovated and expanded several times since then.

Today, it is one of the relatively few remaining Idrisid-era establishments and one of the main landmarks of the city. The minaret was added in 956 and the rest of the building was largely reconstructed between 1203 and 1207 under Almohad rule. Further additions and restorations took place at various times after this. The mosque's original 10th-century minbar has also survived and is now on display at the Dar Batha Museum in Fez.

== History and development ==
=== Foundation ===
According to historical sources like al-Jazna'i, the mosque was founded in 859–60 (245 AH) by Maryam bint Mohammed bin Abdullah al-Fihri (sister of Fatima al-Fihri, who founded the Qarawiyyin Mosque at the same time). Construction was also aided by additional funds donated by a group of local residents of Andalusi background, which gave the mosque its current name. The latter had come to the city as refugees in 818, fleeing the city of Cordoba after a failed uprising which resulted in severe repressions from the Umayyad emir al-Hakam I.

The original construction was modest. According to the 12th-century Andalusian geographer Al-Bakri, the mosque consisted of a hypostyle hall with six aisles (or seven, according to al-Jazna'i) formed by parallel rows of horseshoes arches supported on stone columns. It contained a small sahn (courtyard) where a walnut tree and several other trees were planted. Unlike many later Moroccan mosques, the rows of arches ran east-to-west, parallel with the southern qibla wall instead of perpendicular to it. The mosque had access to abundant water from an artificial water channel known as Oued Masmuda.

=== Early additions (10th century) ===
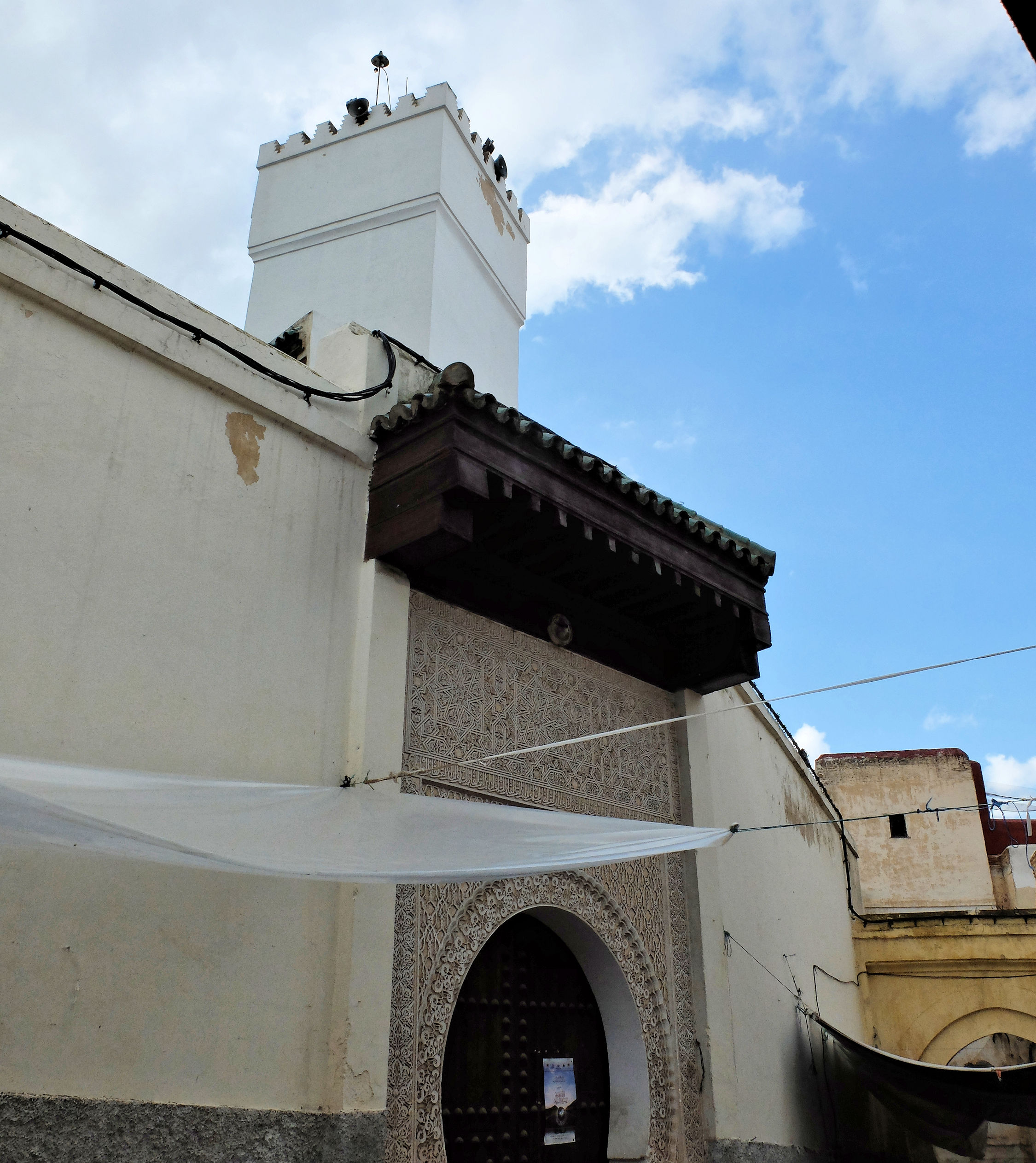
The minaret and eastern entrance of the mosque

During the 10th century, Fez was caught in the rivalry between the Umayyads of Cordoba and the Fatimid Caliphate. However, this benefitted the Al-Andalusiyyin and Al-Qarawiyyin mosques, which both received patronage by rival factions during this period. In 933, the new Zenata governor of Fez, Hamid ibn Hamdan al-Hamdani, a vassal of the Fatimid ruler Ubayd Allah, transferred the venue of the khutbah (the religious sermon during Friday prayers) to this Mosque of the Andalusians, replacing the older Mosque of Al-Ashyakh, the first mosque built in Madinat Fas by Idris I, as the main mosque of the Andalusian Quarter of Fes el-Bali. At the same time, the khutbah was also transferred from the Shurafa Mosque to the Qarawiyyin Mosque on the other shore of the city.

In 956 Abd al-Rahman III, the Umayyad caliph in Cordoba, sponsored the construction of the mosque's minaret, which survives up until today. Henri Terrasse believed that the minaret's location would originally have been the northwestern corner of the mosque (before its later expansion). It has a square base with one main shaft, crowned with small merlons and topped by a dome. It is similar to the minaret of the al-Qarawiyyin Mosque, which was also built at the same time, although it is slightly smaller and simpler. Both were likely related to the grander minaret which Abd ar-Rahman III had built earlier in the same decade. The construction of both minarets was carried out by the local Zenata governor, Ahmed ibn Abi Said, a vassal of the Umayyads, but it is unclear exactly what personal involvement Abd ar-Rahman III had in the project beyond providing the funds.

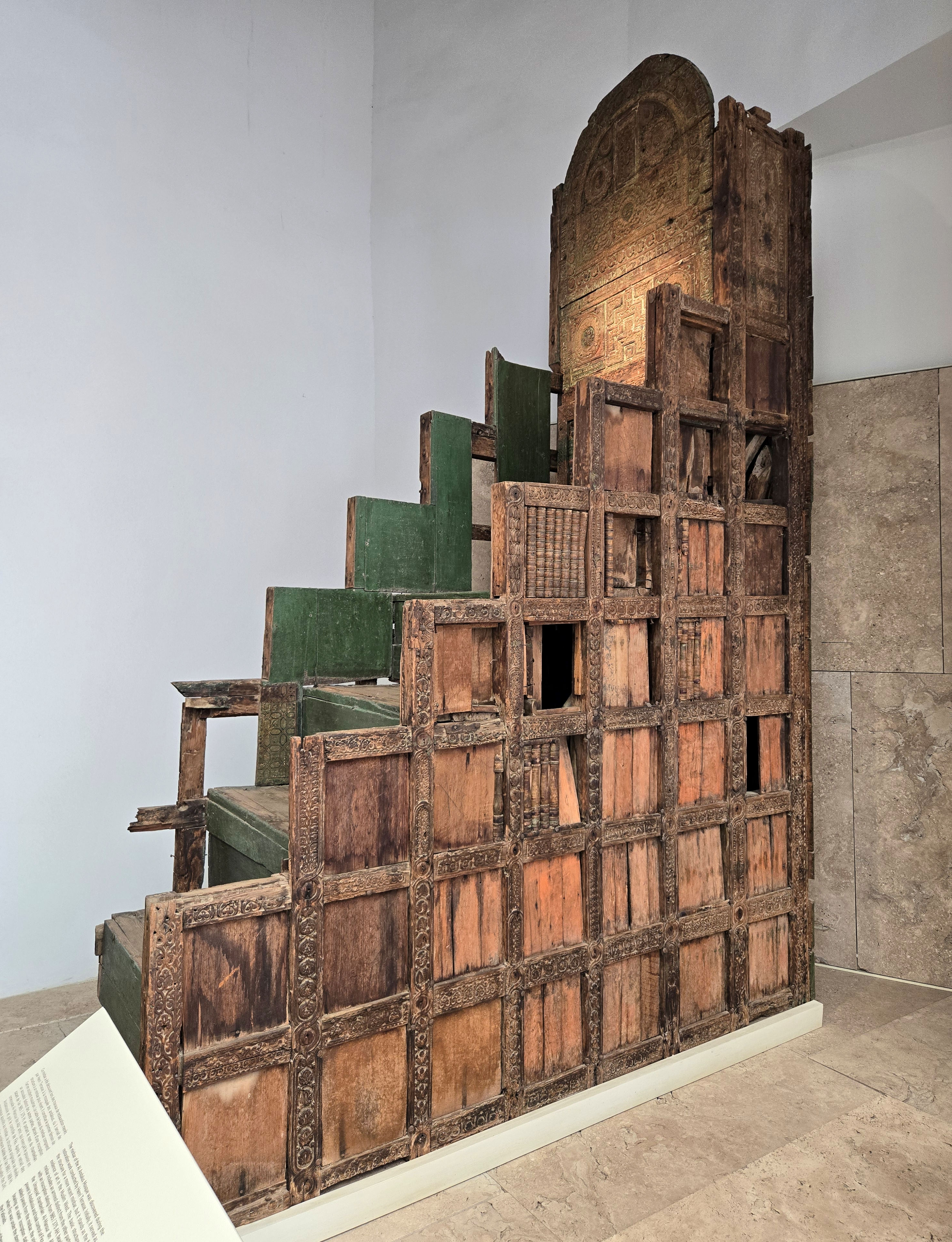
The 10th-century Fatimid and Umayyad minbar, housed today at the Dar Batha Museum

In 980 after northern Morocco had fallen under the control of Buluggin, a Zirid amir who ruled on behalf of the Fatimids (whose base had moved further east to Cairo), he commissioned a new minbar (pulpit) for the mosque, symbolizing the victory of the Shi'a Fatimids over other factions like the Sunni Umayyads of Cordoba. An inscription with this date (369 AH) has been preserved on one of the minbar's original panels, rediscovered in the 20th century by Henri Terrasse during restorations. The new episode of Fatimid domination did not last long, however. In 985, Ibn 'Abi Amir, the vizier of Caliph Hisham II and de facto ruler of Cordoba (known in Christian sources as Almanzor), sent his cousin Askalaja with an army to retake Fez and northern Morocco directly. Within a few months after successfully capturing Fez, the minbar was partly re-crafted with new parts in a very similar artistic style, including an upper section (the backrest) with an inscription recording the date of 375 AH (985 or 986 CE) and the names of Ibn 'Abi Amir and Hisham II. Presumably, the components which identified the minbar as Fatimid were deliberately removed and replaced with Umayyad components. Terrasse suggests that the earlier inscription of 369 AH (which does not include any names) was left in place at the time because the local craftsmen, who may not have been able to read Kufic well, might not have realized its significance.

=== Almohad reconstruction ===
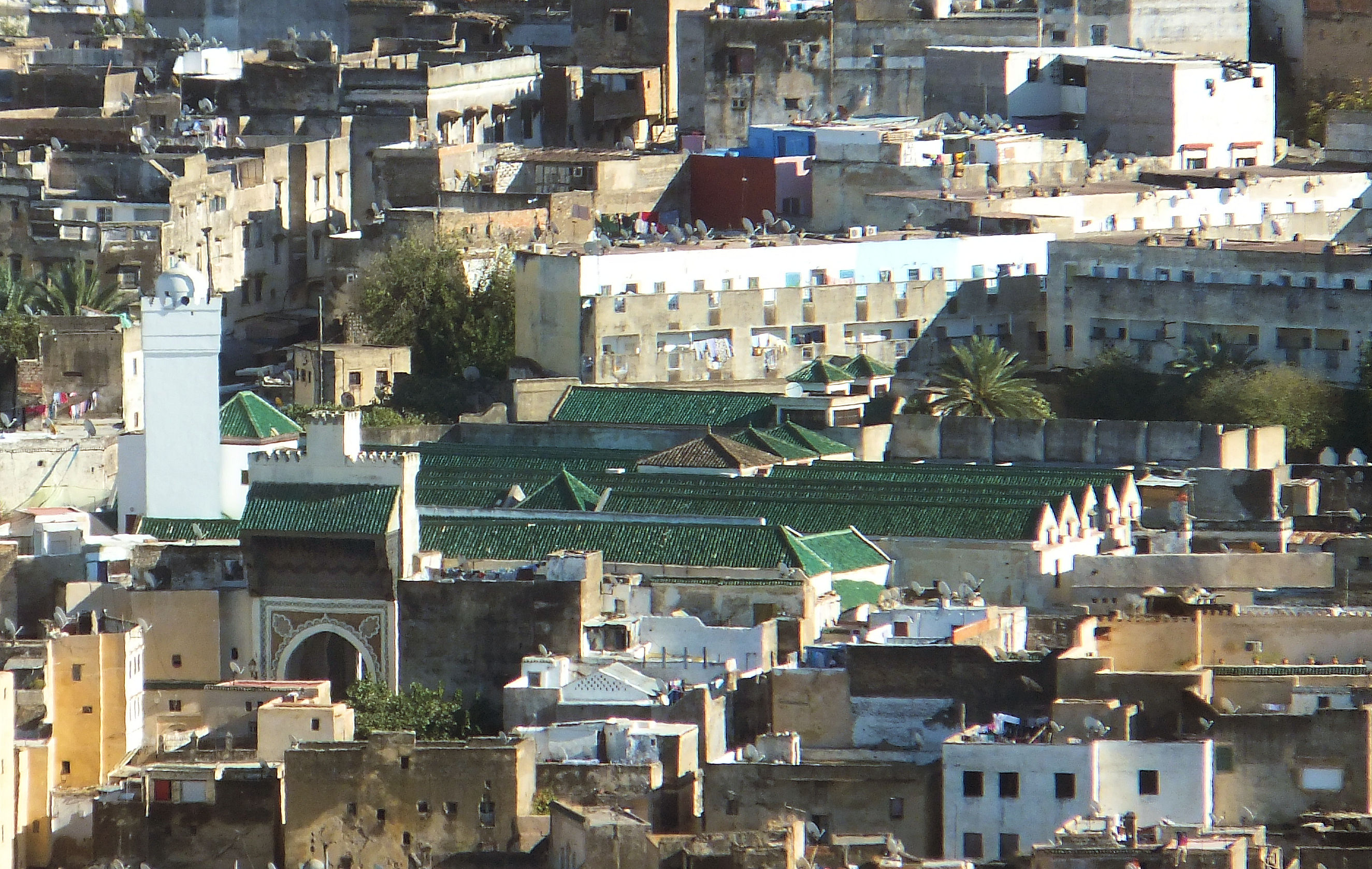
Skyline view of the mosque today; in addition to the minaret (left) the monumental gate of the mosque is visible from afar due to its height

The mosque was not modified again until the early 13th century, during the Almohad period. Muhammad al-Nasir (r. 1199–1213), the fourth Almohad caliph, took a greater interest in Fez than his predecessors, in particular by fortifying the city. According to al-Jazna'i, when the caliph was informed that the Mosque of the Andalusians needed repairs, he ordered its restoration and expansion. Construction occurred between 1203 and 1207, and the mosque's anaza was installed in 1209. Terrasse remarked that this long period, as well as the relatively homogenous fabric of the current building (which has brick pillars instead of stone columns), suggests that the mosque was almost entirely reconstructed at this time. Additionally, the mosque's current qibla alignment appears to be different from the alignment of its 10th-century minaret, suggesting that the latter is still aligned with the mosque's older orientation.

In addition to expanding the mosque's layout, the Almohad reconstruction added a monumental northern gate, a fountain, a new entrance for the women's prayer hall, and an apartment for the imam located on a floor above the women's prayer hall. An ablutions house, or dar al-wudu, was also built across the street, similar in form to another dar al-wudu built at the same time for the Qarawiyyin Mosque. In order to supply water for this ablutions facility, and perhaps because the water of the Oued Masmouda was judged too polluted (since it crossed a large part of the city before reaching the mosque), Al-Nasir also created a new water channel to bring water from outside the city directly to the mosque. The façade of the tall northern gate is decorated with zellij tiles and an elaborate canopy of carved wood, though these were likely restored at a later time and little of the Almohad decoration remains today. Scholar Georges Marçais praised the architecture as a masterpiece of Moroccan architectural style.

Lastly, Al-Nasir's also restored the mosque's old minbar. Once again, rather than replacing the minbar entirely, the Almohads opted to restore and reuse the old one. Most of the minbar, especially its sides, were covered with new wooden panels decorated in the Moorish style of this period, strongly influenced by Andalusi craftsmanship. The upper back panel, however, which featured inscriptions from the 10th-century Umayyad restoration, was preserved in place, perhaps indicating a certain respect the Almohads held for the former Caliphate of Cordoba.

=== Later restorations and embellishments ===
Terrasse remarks that the masonry used in the Almohad construction was of mediocre quality, requiring that it be repaired and restored in the late 13th century under the Marinids. The khatib of the mosque, Abu Abdallah Muhammad ibn Abd al-Qasim ibn Hassuna, made a request for repairs to the Marinid sultan Abu Ya'qub Yusuf, who agreed. Repairs were carried out in 1295–6 (695 AH). Much of the structure, including its pillars and ceilings, was restored at this time. The next sultan, Abu Thabit, who ruled briefly between 1307 and 1308, had the Almohad water canals to the mosque repaired and also installed the ornate fountain in the north wall of the mosque's courtyard. Although not mentioned in historical sources, Terrasse believed that the eastern gate of the mosque, near the minaret, was likely built or decorated in the 14th century, perhaps also under Abu Thabit. The Dar al-Muwaqqit, an apartment for the timekeeper built on the second floor, on the southeast side of the minaret, probably also dates from the Marinid period, when such structures began to be added to mosques. A large storage space at the back of the mosque, with a cursive inscription panel above its double doors, appears to have served as a library and was founded by one of the last Marinid sultans, Abu Sa'id Uthman III, in 1415 (816 AH). Terrasse also dated several other elements of carved wood in this area, in and around the imam's door and the Funerary Mosque (Jama' al-Gna'iz) at the back of the mosque, to Abu Sa'id Uthman III.

The mosque also provided seven courses for education and contained two libraries, similar to the al-Qarawiyyin Mosque, making it the second most important mosque in the medina of Fez. The Marinids also founded at least two madrasas nearby in the early 14th century: the Sahrij Madrasa and Sba'iyyin Madrasa. Like the madrasas near the Qarawiyyin Mosque, they offered courses but also served to house students from outside the city who came to study at the mosque. The mosque itself has been restored many times over the years, allowing it to preserve its form. The present appearance of the mosque's monumental gate likely dates from a restoration during the Alawi period. Moulay Isma'il (r. 1672–1727) renovated the Marinid fountain in the mosque's courtyard, where his name is still visible. The mihrab's carved stucco decoration was also remade at some recent period and is no older than the 18th century. Among more modern restorations, the French scholar Henri Terrasse, who worked on several monuments during the French Protectorate period (1912–1956) conducted a full study of the mosque and its minbar, which was published in 1942. The original 10th-century minbar from the Fatimid and Umayyad periods was uncovered during this study and is now on display at the Dar Batha Museum in Fez.

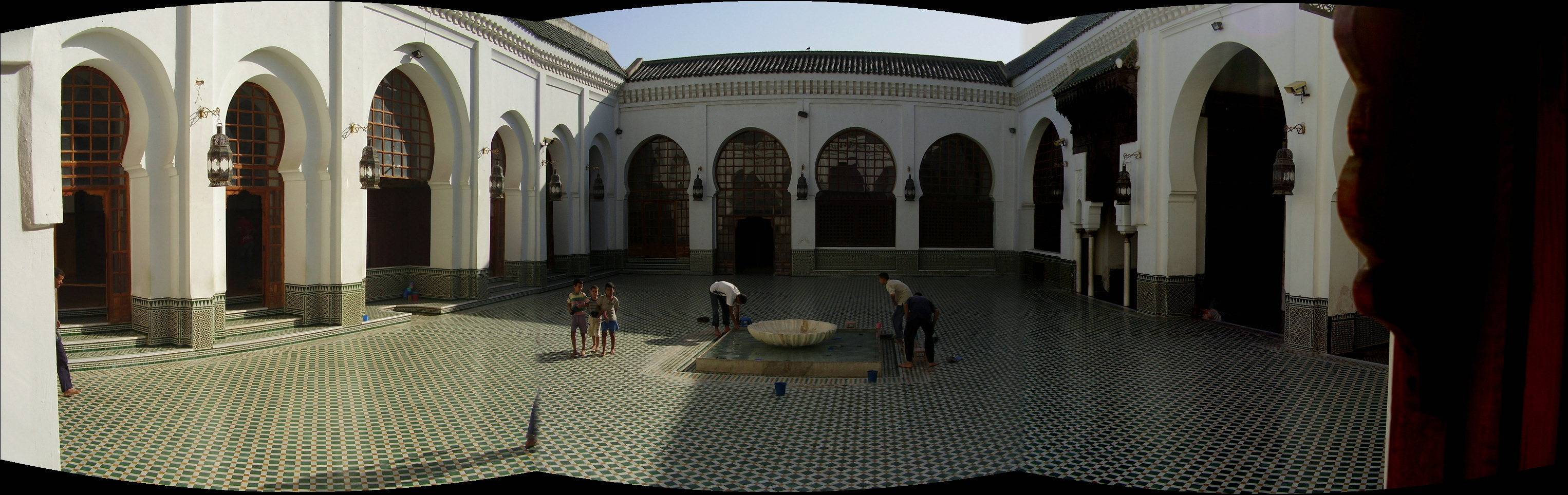
Panoramic view of the mosque courtyard; the Marinid-era fountain is visible to the right, next to the large entrance

== See also ==
- Lists of mosques
- List of mosques in Africa
- List of mosques in Morocco
