= Dar Batha =

- دار البطحاء
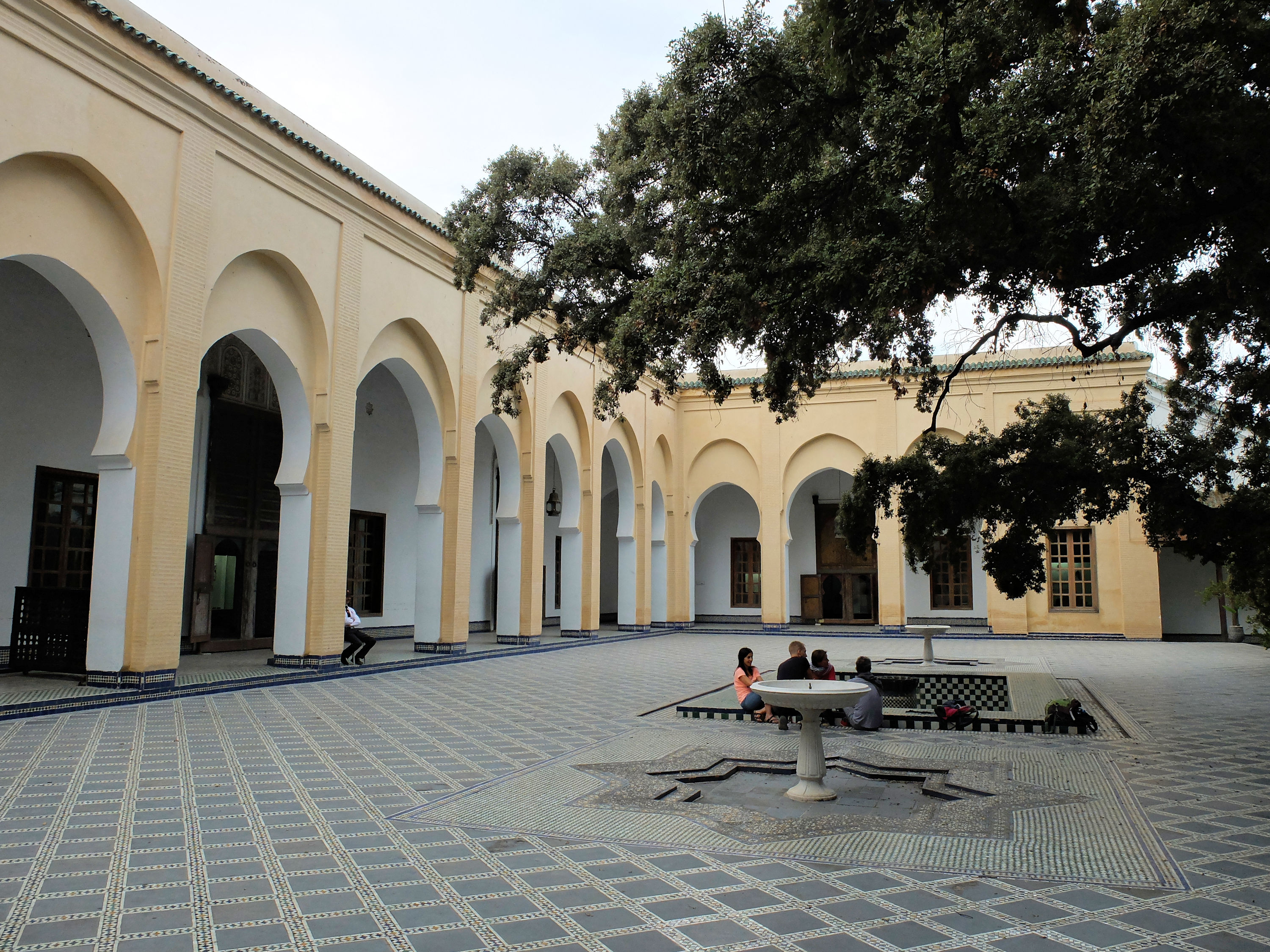
- Interactive map of the Dar Batha area

General information
- Type: palace, riad
- Architectural style: Moorish (Alawi)
- Location: Fez, Morocco
- Coordinates: 34°03′38″N 4°58′58″W
- Construction started: 1886
- Completed: 1907
- Renovated: 1990-1996

Technical details
- Material: wood, brick, tile
- Floor count: 1

Dar Batḥa (Arabic: دار البطحاء, pronounced Bat-ḥaa), or Qasr al-Batḥa (Arabic: قصر البطحاء), is a former royal palace and present-day museum in Fez, Morocco. The palace was commissioned by the Alawi sultan Hassan I in the late 19th century and finished under his successor Abdelaziz. It was converted into a museum of historical arts and crafts in 1915 with a collection that now comprises over 6,500 objects. Since a renovation completed in 2025, it is officially known as the Al Batha Museum of Islamic Arts.

The palace is located near Bab Bou Jeloud at the western edge of Fes el-Bali, the old medina quarter of the city, and close to Fes el-Jdid, the new medina quarter. It is adjacent to the Dar el-Beida palace located to its southeast, which was originally part of the same complex.

== History ==
Before the reign of Hassan I (r. 1873–1894), the land on which Dar Batha is located was occupied only by small isolated structures between Fes el-Bali and Fes el-Jdid. It was only when Moulay Hassan decided to build a corridor of walls connecting the two cities that much of this space was filled with royal gardens (such as Jnan Sbil) and palaces. The land for Dar Batha was purchased from the wealthy Ben Jelloun family of Fes.

Dar Batha and Dar el-Beida were constructed to serve as a summer palace and as a residence for distinguished visitors and guests. The palace was commissioned and begun in the late 19th century by Moulay Hassan I and then finished and embellished by Moulay Abdelaziz (r. 1894–1908). One source reports that construction took place between 1886 and 1907. The adjoining Dar el-Beida was completed by Sultan Abdelhafid (r. 1909–1912), the last independent sultan of Morocco in the early 20th century.

In 1912 both palaces were used to house the services of the Resident-general of the new French Protectorate. In 1915, Dar Batha was converted into a museum of local arts (previously housed at the Dar Adiyel), then eventually as a national ethnographical museum and cultural center. In 1924 it was classified as a national monument.

In 2016, a campaign to renovate many of Morocco's museums began. Renovation works on the Batha Museum began in April 2019, with a projected cost of 15.6 million Moroccan dirhams and with a goal to convert it into a museum of Islamic art. The museum reopened to visitors on 26 February 2025.

== Architecture ==
The main entrance of the building leads to a vast rectangular courtyard around which the building is centered. The courtyard is surrounded by galleries and by the two main wings of the building are at its eastern and western ends. The courtyard floor is decorated at its west and east ends with colorful zellij mosaic tilework across its floor and around its ornamental fountains. The galleries at the east and west ends of the courtyard consist of large horseshoe arches in brick, while the galleries to the north and south of the central garden are made of painted wood. Some of the other rooms around the palace are also decorated with zellij and painted woodwork.

The garden represents a typical riad layout and Andalusian style, a rectangular area divided into four parts along its two central axes, with a fountain at its middle. It makes up around 58% of the entire area of the palace. The garden was originally arranged by landscape architect Jean-Claude Nicolas Forestier in 1915 for the recreational use of the visitors, especially during the summer. Among the tree and plant species here are palm trees, jacarandas, and hibiscus. Today, concerts and religious festivals are held in the garden.

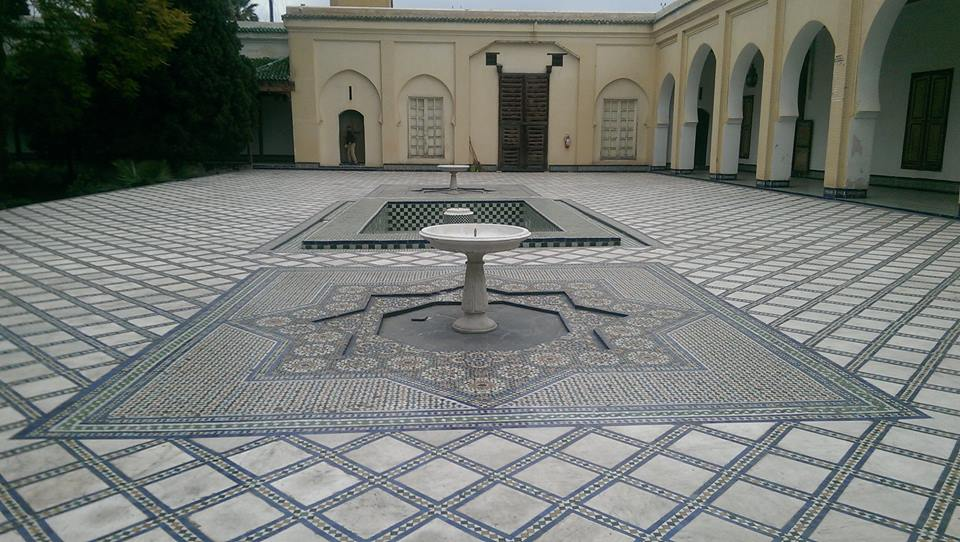
The courtyard of the palace, with zellij-covered fountains

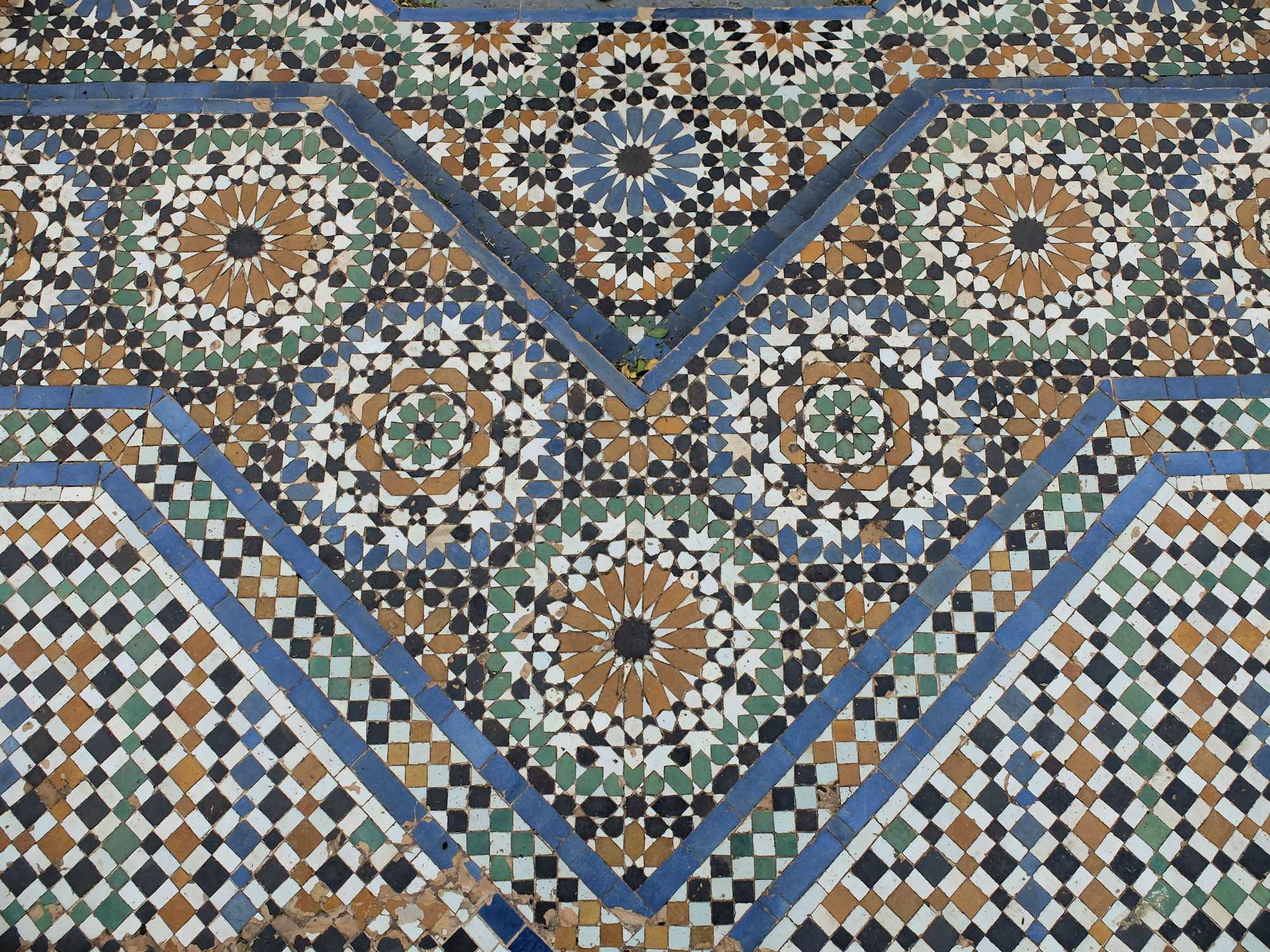
Zellij paving around the fountain

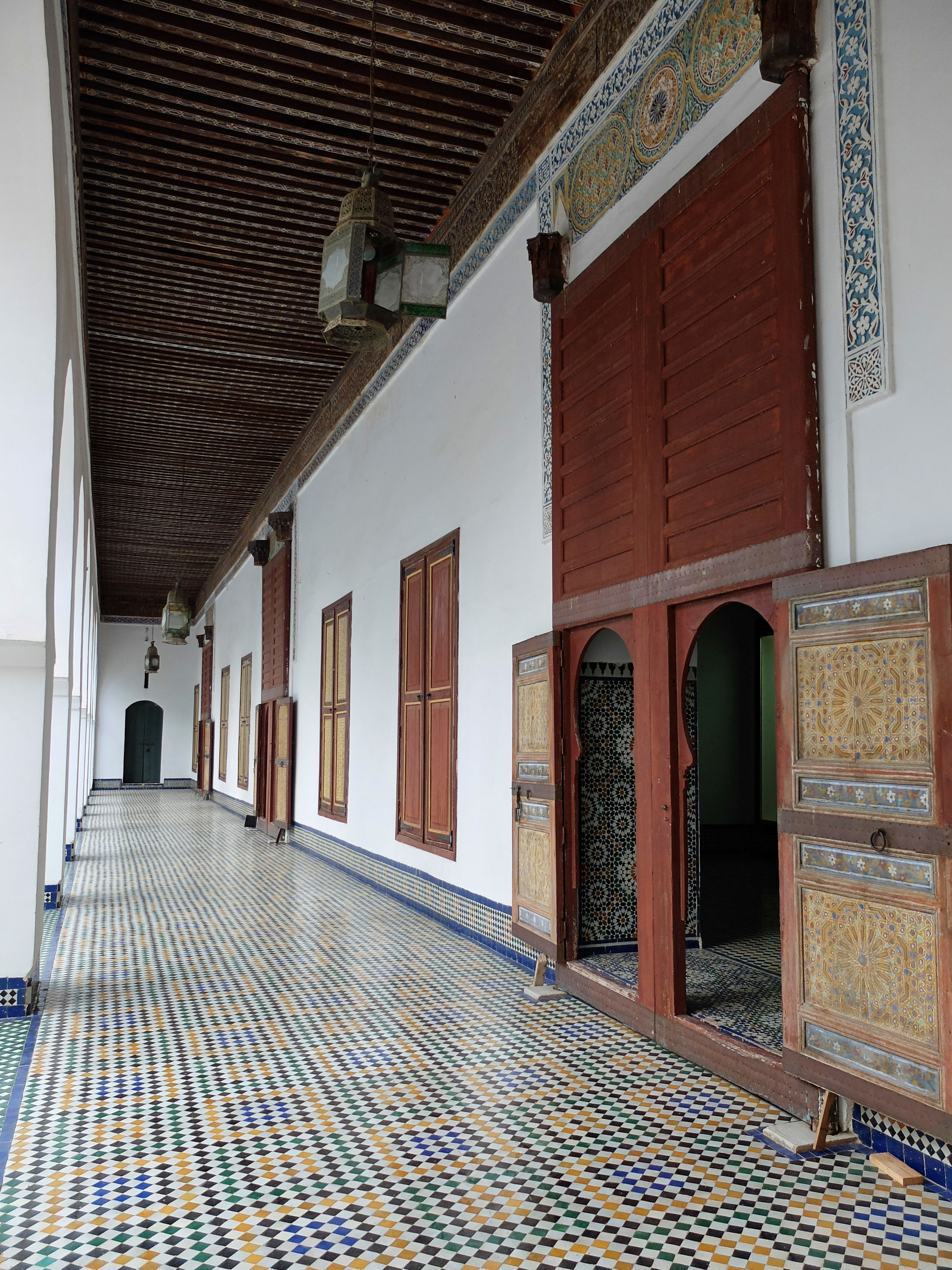
Gallery around the courtyard

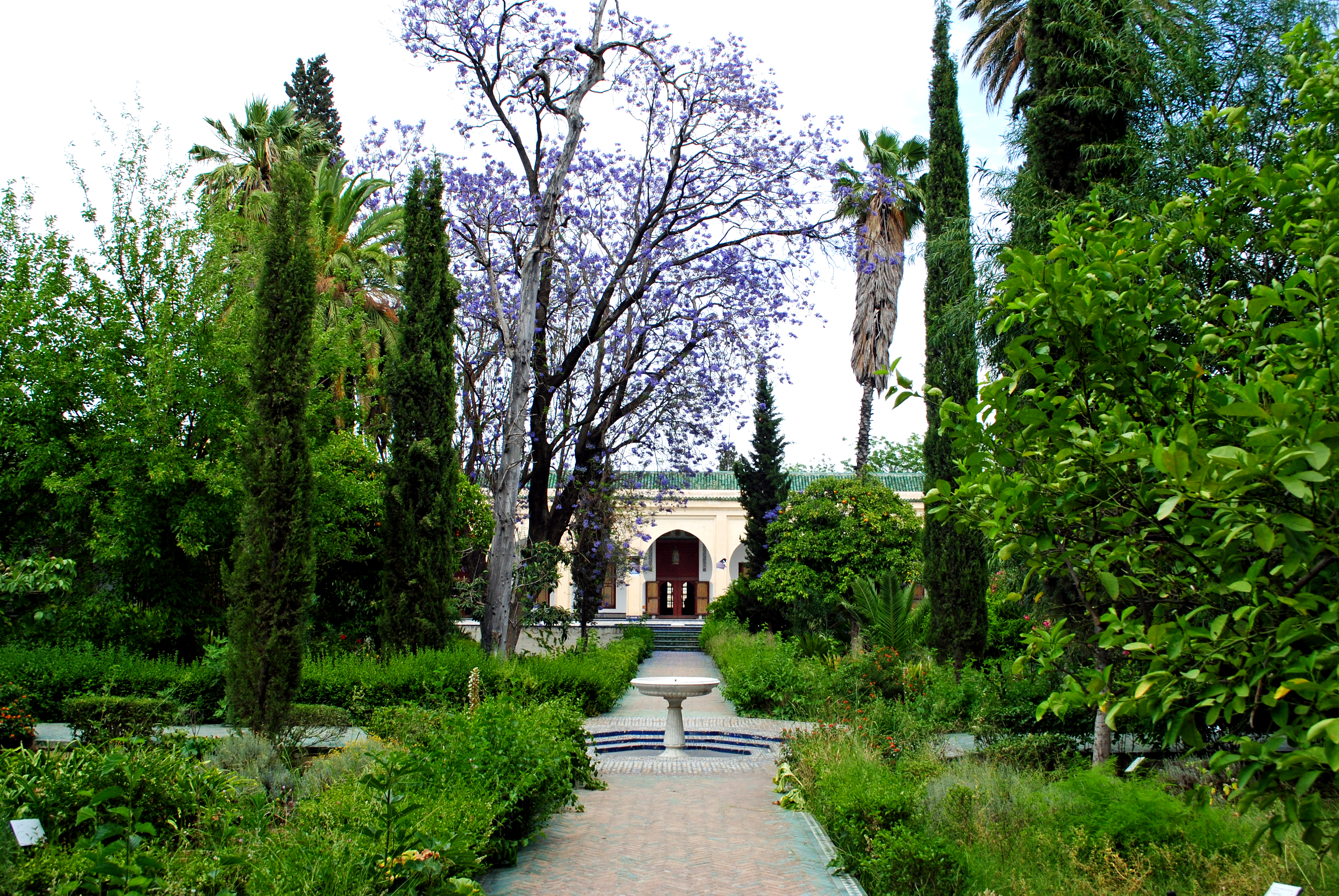
The central riad garden

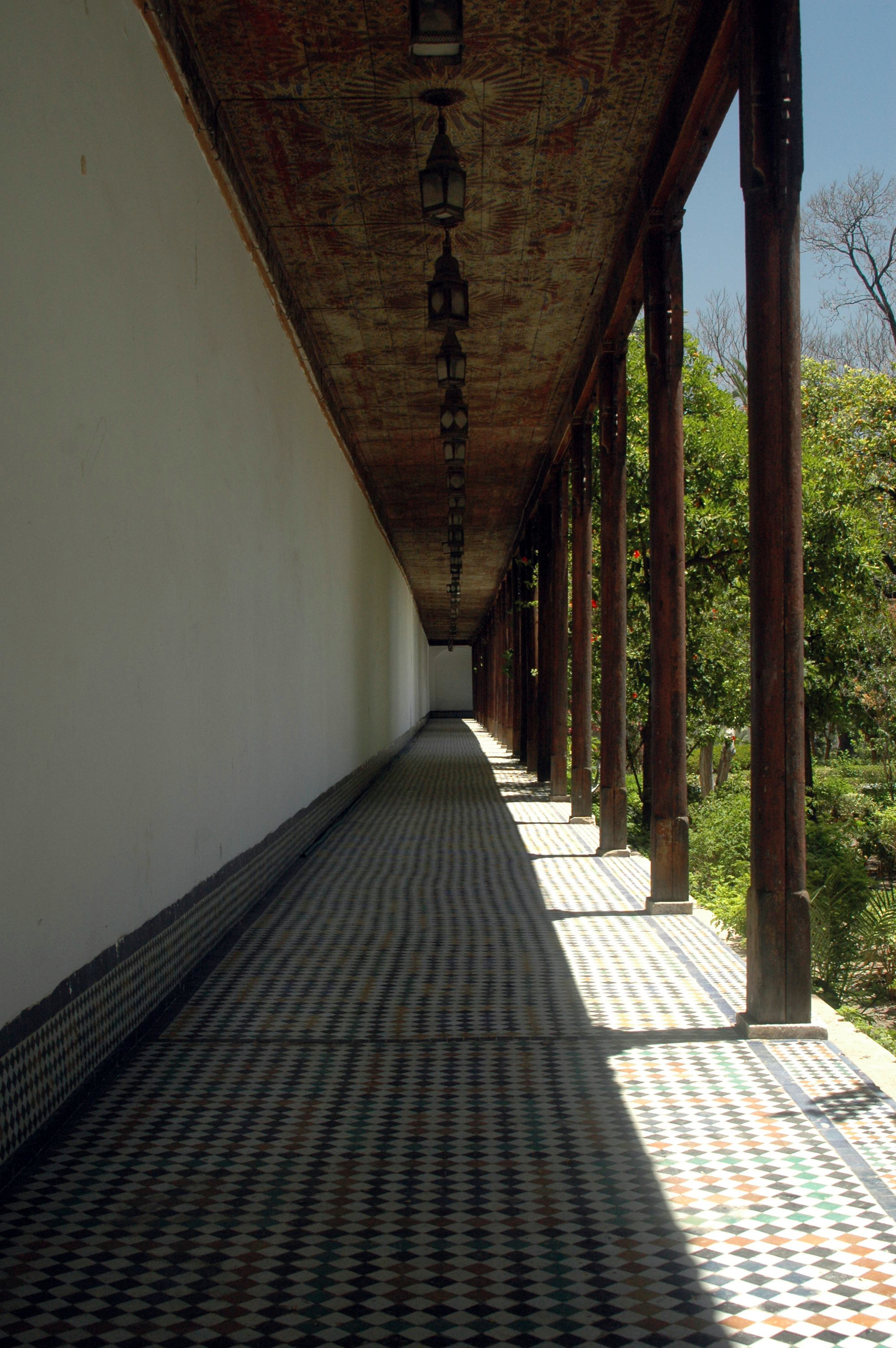
One of the wooden galleries along the northern or southern edge of the garden

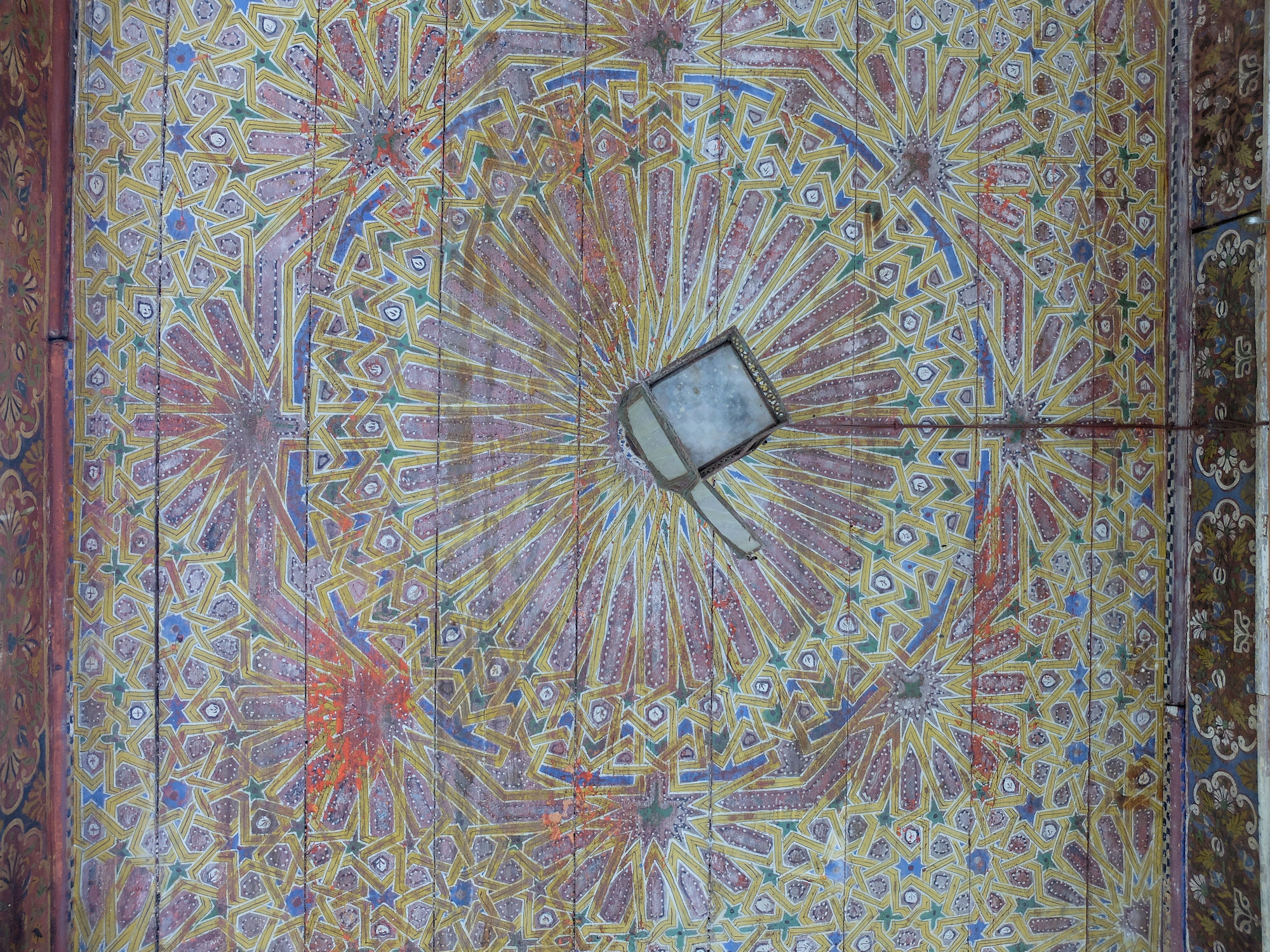
Painted decoration on the ceiling of the wooden gallery

== Museum collection ==
The museum houses a large and valuable collection of 6500 archaeological and historical art artifacts. Many of them are taken from the historic or ruined buildings in the medina of Fez (Fes el-Bali and Fes el-Jdid), including various mosques and madrasas. Some of the oldest artifacts and pieces of art in Fes are housed here, including architectural fragments from the Idrisid era and the remains of the 9th-century minbar of the Mosque of the Andalusians, crafted under both Fatimid and Córdoban Umayyad patronage. The 14th-century minbar of the Bou Inania Madrasa is also housed here. Other artifacts include historic Qur'ans, astrolabes, musical instruments, carpets, jewelry, and a large collection of local ceramics in the "blue" style of Fes. The objects are arranged thematically across the rooms of the palace.

== See also ==
- Kasbah Palace, Tangier
- List of Moroccan royal residences
