= Tarik Bengelloun =

French footballer (born 1991)

Personal information
- Date of birth: 8 February 1991 (age 35)
- Place of birth: Paris, France
- Positions: Midfielder; winger; forward

Senior career*
Years	Team	Apps	(Gls)
20xx-2008	FC Nantes	0	(0)
2008-20xx	Nottingham Forest F.C.	0	(0)
2010	Greenock Morton F.C.	0	(0)
2010-2011	Racing Club de France Football	4+	(0+)
2011-2012	Enosis Neon Paralimni FC	1	(0)
2012-2013	Le Havre AC B	15	(3)
2013-2014	Pau FC	25	(6)
2014-2015	US Colomiers Football	9	(0)
2015	Moulins Yzeure Foot	3	(0)
2016	Raja Casablanca (trial)		
2016-2017	AS Poissy	12	(0)
20xx-2018	FCM Aubervilliers		
2018	Paris FC B	4	(0)
- * Club domestic league appearances and goals

Tarik Bengelloun (Arabic: طارق بنجلون, romanized: Ṭāriq Binjallūn; Greek: Ταρίκ Μπεντζελούν, romanized: Tarík Bentzeloún; born 8 February 1991) is a French former footballer who is last known to have played for Paris B in his home country.

== Career ==
Bengelloun started his senior career with Nantes. In 2011, he signed for Enosis Neon Paralimni in the Cypriot First Division, where he made one appearance and scored zero goals. After that, he played for French clubs Le Havre AC B, Pau, US Colomiers Football, Moulins Yzeure Foot, AS Poissy, and Paris B.
