= Ahmed Benjelloun =

Moroccan politician (1942–2015)

- أحمد بنجلون
- Born: 1942; Ain Bni Mathar, Morocco
- Died: 1 February 2015 (aged 72–73); Rabat, Morocco
- Political party: National Union of Popular Forces; Socialist Democratic Vanguard Party (1983–2002); Unified Socialist Party (2002-2015)

Ahmed Benjelloun (Arabic: أحمد بنجلون, romanized: Aḥmad Binjallūn; 1942 – 1 February 2015) was a Moroccan politician and activist, mainly known as the founder and the former secretary general for the Socialist Democratic Vanguard Party.

Benjelloun was the younger brother of the assassinated political activist Omar Benjelloun. He was a member of the same party (National Union of Popular Forces) until 1983, where after major disagreements with the secretary general Abderrahim Bouabid, regarding participation in elections, he decided to leave and founded the Socialist Democratic Vanguard Party together with Abderrahman Benamrou. The new party boycotted all elections in Morocco until 2007. Later, it joined the Unified Socialist Party coalition which participated in Moroccan elections since then.
