= Henri Terrasse =

French historian and archaeologist (1895–1971)

Henri Terrasse (Vrigny-aux-Bois, 8 August 1895 – Grenoble, 11 October 1971) was a French historian, archeologist, and orientalist who specialized in the art and history of the Islamic world and of Morocco in particular.

== Biography ==
Terrasse was born in France in 1895. In 1921, he emigrated to the French protectorate of Morocco, where he taught first at the Collège Moulay Youssef. In 1923 he became professor at the important Institut des Hautes Études Marocaines in Rabat, where he collaborated with French orientalist Henri Basset for a series of studies on Almohad mosques. In 1932, he defended a thesis for the Sorbonne on "Hispano-Moorish" art up to the Almohad period. In 1935, he was appointed the director of the Service des Monuments historiques du Maroc, an agency under the French Protectorate which inspected and managed historic monuments and antiquities in the country. In this job, he dedicated himself to the conservation and restoration of Morocco's historical heritage and published several important monographs on specific monuments such as the Mosque of the Andalusians in Fez and the Great Mosque of Taza. In 1941, he was promoted from professor to director of the Institut des Hautes Études Marocaines. In 1945, he also succeeded Georges Marçais as the chair of Islamic archeology at the University of Algiers. In 1957, shortly after Moroccan independence from France, he moved to Spain to become director of the Casa de Velázquez in Madrid, before retiring in 1965. His last major publication was a detailed study of the architectural history of the Qarawiyyin Mosque in Fez. He died in 1971.

== Academic contributions ==
The Grove Encyclopedia of Islamic Art and Architecture describes Terrasse's work as the foundation of the art history of Islamic-era Morocco and the surrounding region, although it notes that his work is "sometimes characterized by misconceptions typical of the French colonial school of scholarship, such as the dichotomous interpretation of Moroccan history into Arab and Berber cultures". Along with Georges Marçais, Terrasse was instrumental in establishing the modern study of the "western Islamic world" as a cultural and artistic region spanning across both western North Africa (the Maghreb) and al-Andalus (the Islamic period of the Iberian Peninsula). Similarly, Jonathan Bloom characterized him, along with Marçais, as one of the most important foundational scholars in the study of western Islamic architecture.

== Selected publications ==
- Les Arts décoratifs au Maroc (Paris, 1923) – with J. Hainaut
- “Sanctuaires et forteresses almohades,” Hespéris, IV (1924), pp. 9–91 and 181–203; V (1925), pp. 311–76; VI (1926), pp. 102–270; VII (1927), pp. 117–71 and 287–345; also published as Sanctuaires et forteresses almohades (Paris, 1932; republished again in 2001) – with Henri Basset
- L’Art hispano–mauresque des origines au XIIIe siècle (Paris, 1932)
- La Mosquée des Andalous à Fès (Paris, 1942)
- La Grande Mosquée de Taza (Paris, 1943)
- L’Histoire du Maroc depuis les origines jusqu’au protectorat français (Casablanca, 1949–50)
- Recherches archéologiques à Marrakech (Paris, 1952) – with Jacques Meunié
- Nouvelles Recherches archéologiques à Marrakech (Paris, 1957) – with Jacques Meunié
- La Mosquée al-Qaraouiyin à Fès (Paris, 1968)
