= Minbar =

Pulpit in a mosque

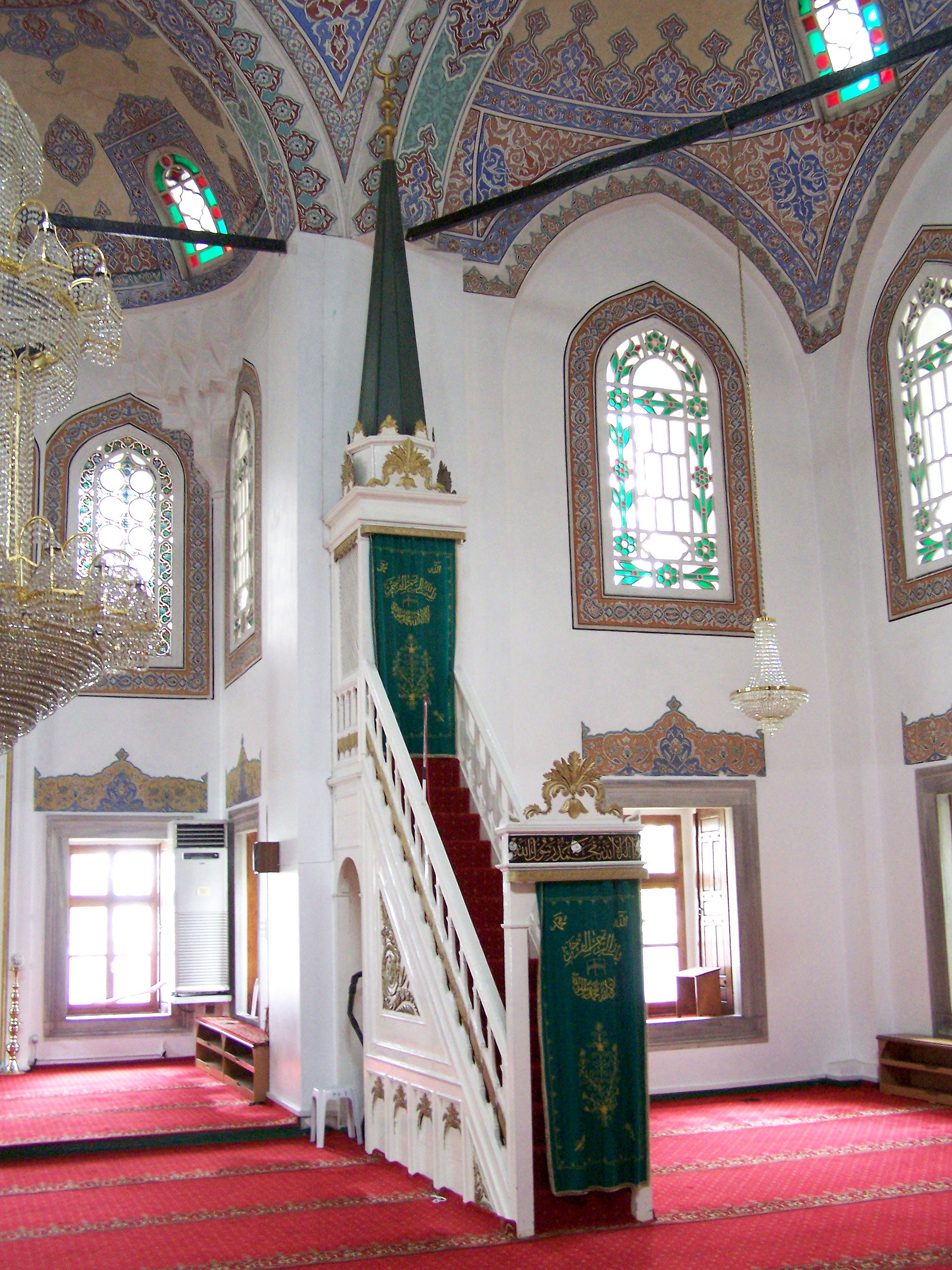
Ottoman-era minbar of the Molla Çelebi Mosque in Istanbul.

A minbar (Arabic: منبر; sometimes romanized as mimber) is a pulpit in a mosque where the imam (leader of prayers) stands to deliver sermons (خطبة, khutbah). It is also used in other similar contexts, such as in a Husayniyya, where the speaker sits and lectures the congregation.

== Etymology ==
The word is a derivative of the Arabic root ن‌ب‌ر n-b-r ("to raise, elevate"); the Arabic plural is manābir (مَنابِر).

== Function and form ==
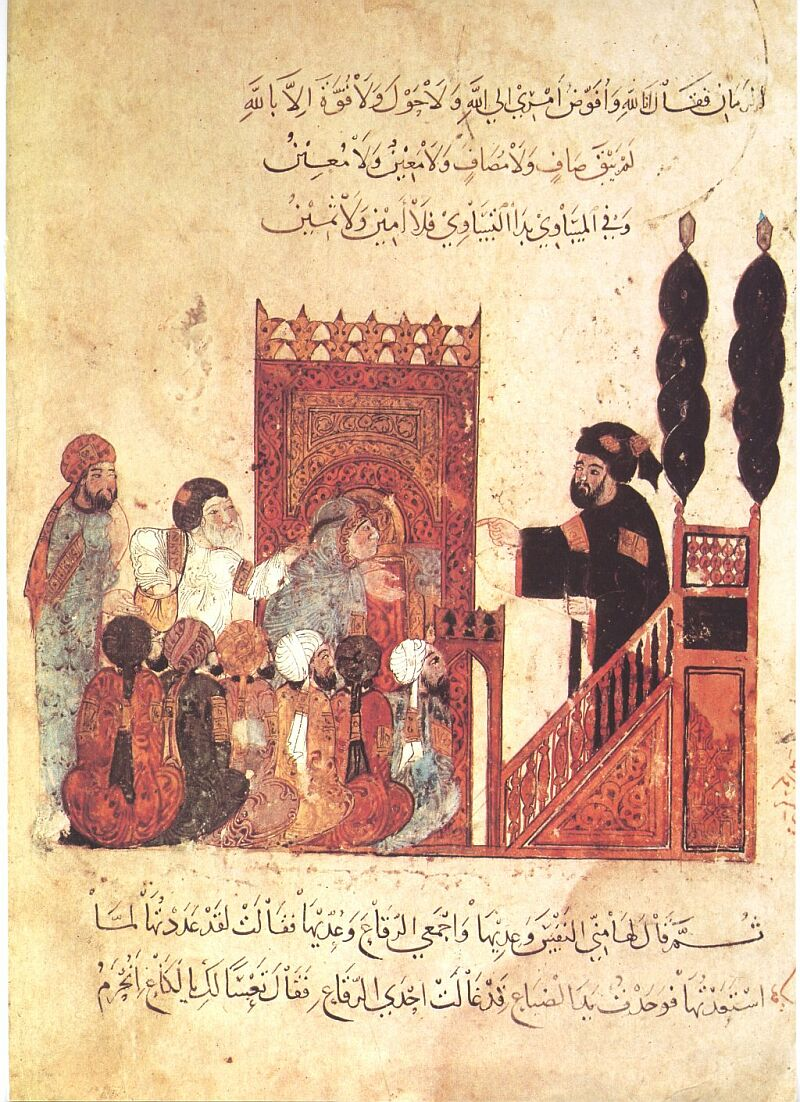
Abbasid Qadi delivers Khutbah in Mosque on the Minbar.

The minbar is symbolically the seat of the imam who leads prayers in the mosque and delivers sermons. In the early years of Islam, this seat was reserved for the Islamic prophet Muhammad and later for the caliphs who followed him, each of whom was officially the imam of the whole Muslim community. It eventually became standard for all Friday mosques and was used by the local imam, but it retained its significance as a symbol of authority.

While minbars are roughly similar to church pulpits, they have a function and position more similar to that of a church lectern, being used instead by the imam for a wide range of readings and prayers. The minbar is located to the right of the mihrab, a niche in the far wall of the mosque that symbolizes the direction of prayer (i.e. towards Mecca). It is usually shaped like a small tower with a seat or kiosk-like structure at its top and a staircase leading up to it. The bottom of the staircase often has a doorway or portal. In contrast to many Christian pulpits, the steps up to the minbar are usually in a straight line on the same axis as the seat.

In some mosques, there is an elevated platform – dikka in Arabic or müezzin mahfil in Turkish – opposite the minbar where the assistant of the imam, the muezzin, stands during prayer. The muezzin recites the answers to the prayers of the imam where applicable.

== Origins ==
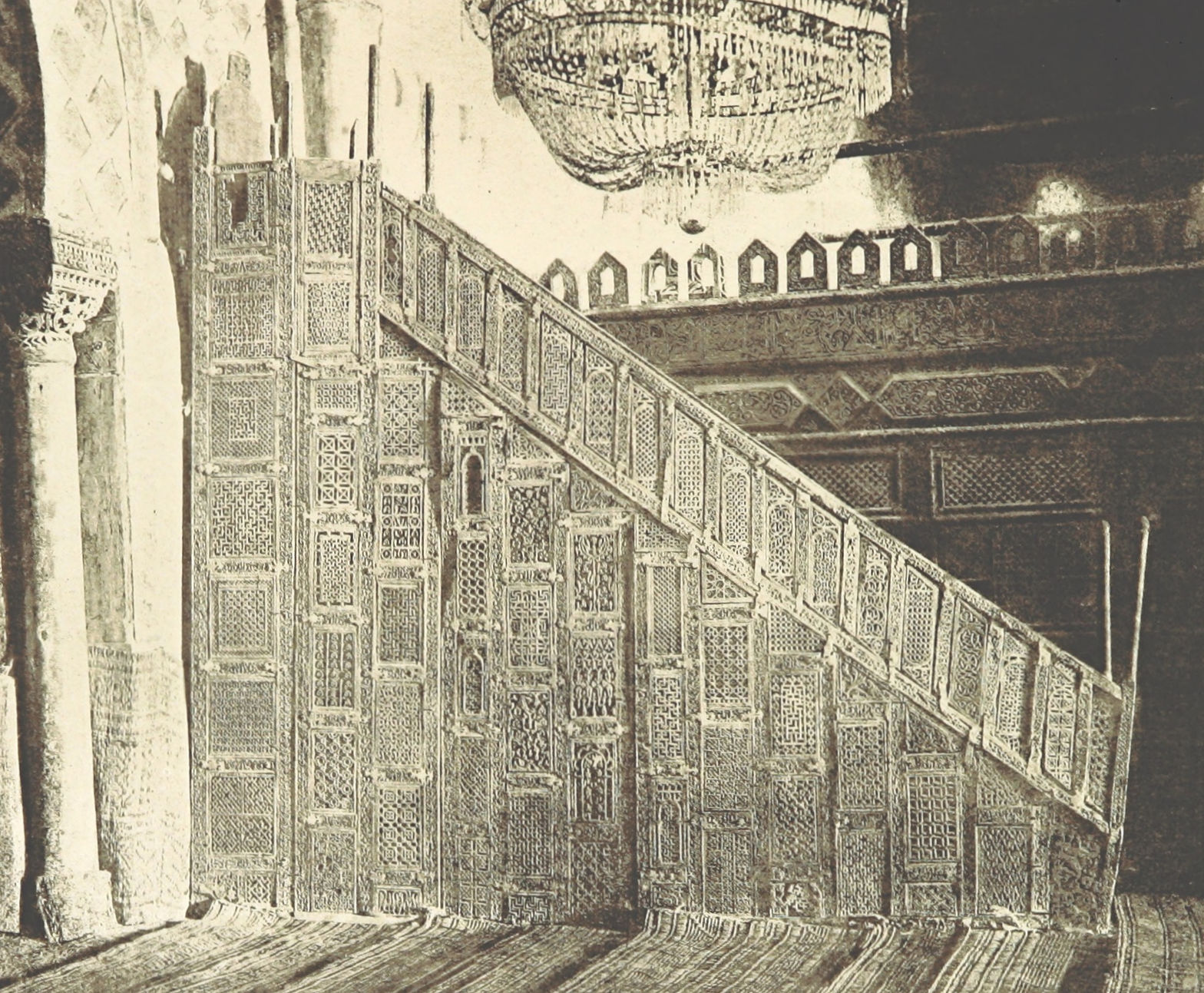
The minbar of the Great Mosque of Kairouan in Kairouan, Tunisia, the oldest minbar in existence, still in its original location in the prayer hall of the mosque. (Photograph from the 19th century, before a modern protective glass barrier was installed)

The first recorded minbar in the Islamic world was Muhammad's minbar in Medina, created in 629 CE (or between 628 and 631 CE). It consisted simply of two steps and a seat, resembling a throne. After Muhammad's death, this minbar continued to be used as a symbol of authority by the caliphs who followed him. The Umayyad caliph Mu'awiya I (r. 661–680) heightened Muhammad's original minbar by increasing the number of steps from three to six, thus increasing its prominence. During the Umayyad period, the minbar was used by the caliphs or their representative governors to make important public announcements and to deliver the Friday sermon (khutba). In the last years of the Umayyad Caliphate, before its fall in 750, the Umayyads ordered minbars to be constructed for all the Friday mosques of Egypt and soon afterward this practice was extended to other Muslim territories. By the early Abbasid period (after 750), it had become standard in Friday mosques across all Muslim communities.

Minbars thus quickly developed into a symbol of political and religious legitimacy for Muslim authorities. It was one of the only major formal furnishings of a mosque and was therefore an important architectural feature in itself. More importantly, it was the setting for the weekly Friday sermon which, notably, usually mentioned the name of the current Muslim ruler over the community and included other public announcements of a religious or political nature. As a result, later Muslim rulers sometimes invested considerable expense in commissioning richly decorated minbars for the main mosques of their major cities.

The oldest Islamic pulpit in the world to be preserved up to the present day is the minbar of the Great Mosque of Kairouan in Kairouan, Tunisia. It dates from around 860 or 862 CE, under the tenure of the Aghlabid governor Abu Ibrahim Ahmad, and was imported in whole or in part from Baghdad. It is an eleven-step staircase made of over 300 sculpted pieces of teak wood (a material imported from India). Thanks to its age and the richness of its decoration, it is considered an important piece of historic Islamic art.

== Wood minbars ==
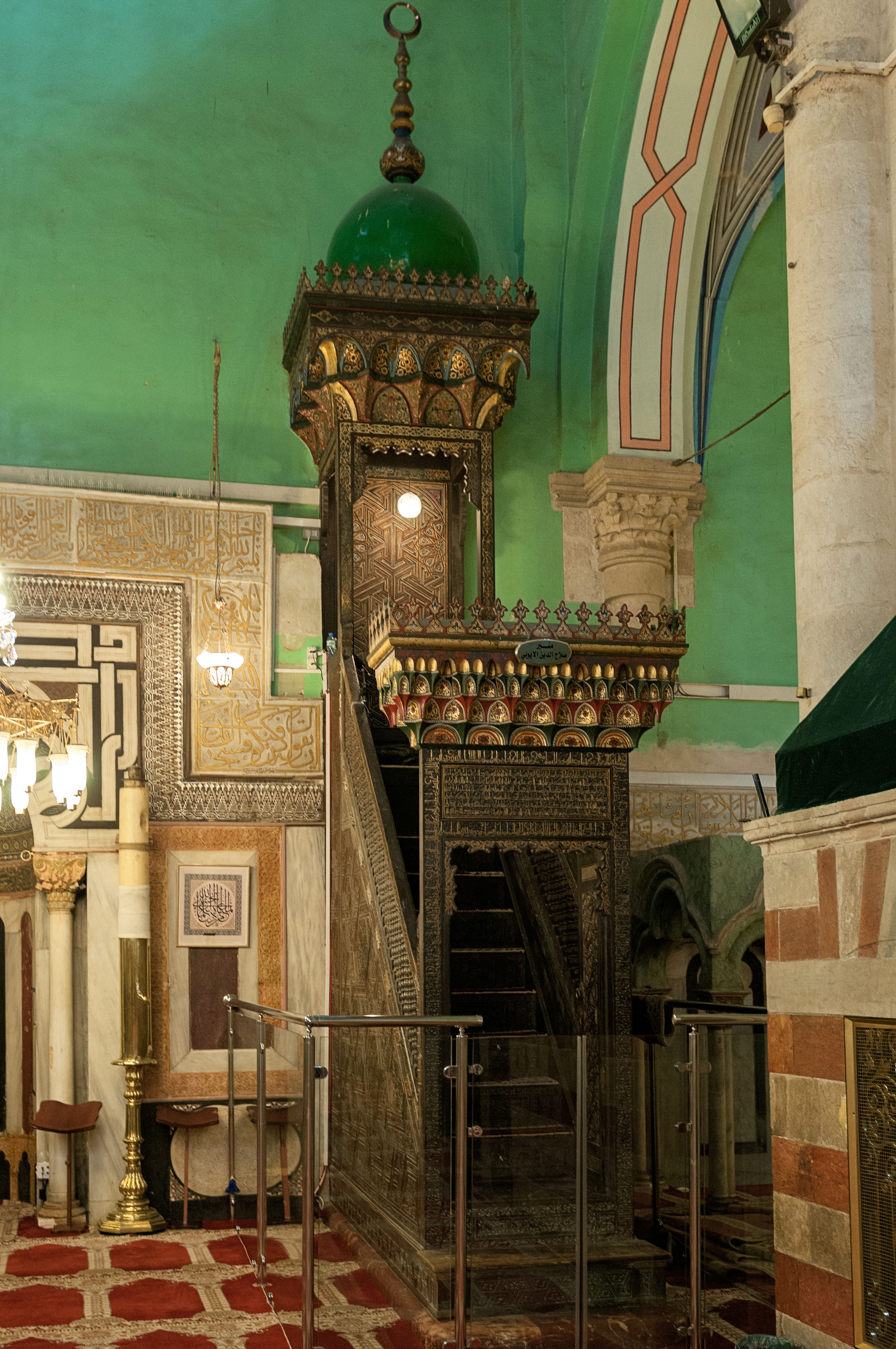
The Fatimid minbar in the Ibrahimi Mosque in Hebron, commissioned in 1091

Woodwork was the primary medium for the construction of minbars in much of the Middle East and North Africa up until the Ottoman period. These wooden minbars were in many cases very intricately decorated with geometric patterns and carved arabesques (vegetal and floral motifs), as well as with Arabic calligraphic inscriptions (often recording the minbar's creation or including Qur'anic verses). In some cases they also featured delicate inlay work with ivory or mother-of-pearl. Many workshops created minbars that were assembled from hundreds of pieces held together using an interlocking technique and wooden pegs, but without glue or metal nails.

=== Levant and Egypt ===
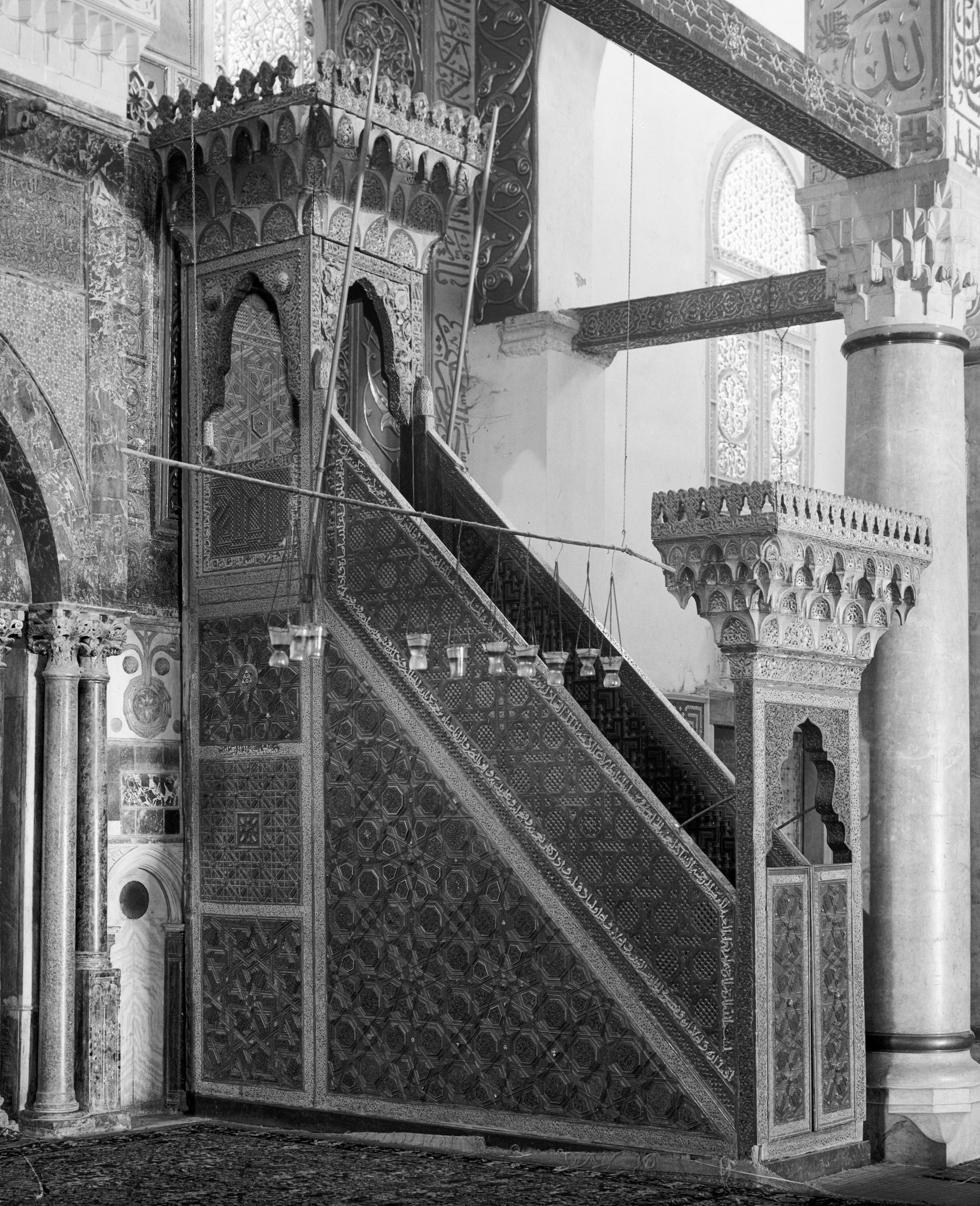
The Minbar of Saladin in the al-Aqsa mosque, Jerusalem (photograph from 1930s). The minbar was built in wood and commissioned by Nur al-Din in 1168–69, then installed in the mosque by Saladin in 1187.

Some of the best-documented minbars are those produced in the Levant and Egypt from the 11th to 15th centuries. The oldest surviving example is the Minbar of the Ibrahimi Mosque in Hebron, commissioned in 1091 under the Fatimids, originally for a shrine in Ascalon. It features decoration in geometric strapwork motifs and Arabic inscriptions. Among the most famous minbars was the Minbar of the al-Aqsa Mosque (also known as the Minbar of Saladin) in Jerusalem, commissioned in 1168–1169 by Nur ad-Din and signed by four different craftsmen. Prior to its destruction by arson in 1969, it was the most accomplished surviving example of Syrian craftsmanship in this woodworking tradition. Its sides were decorated with a tracery-like geometric pattern whose pieces were filled with carved arabesques. Its balustrades were made of turned wood assembled into a grille with more geometric designs, framed by Arabic inscriptions. Both the portal at the bottom and the kiosk-canopy at the top were crowned with muqarnas.

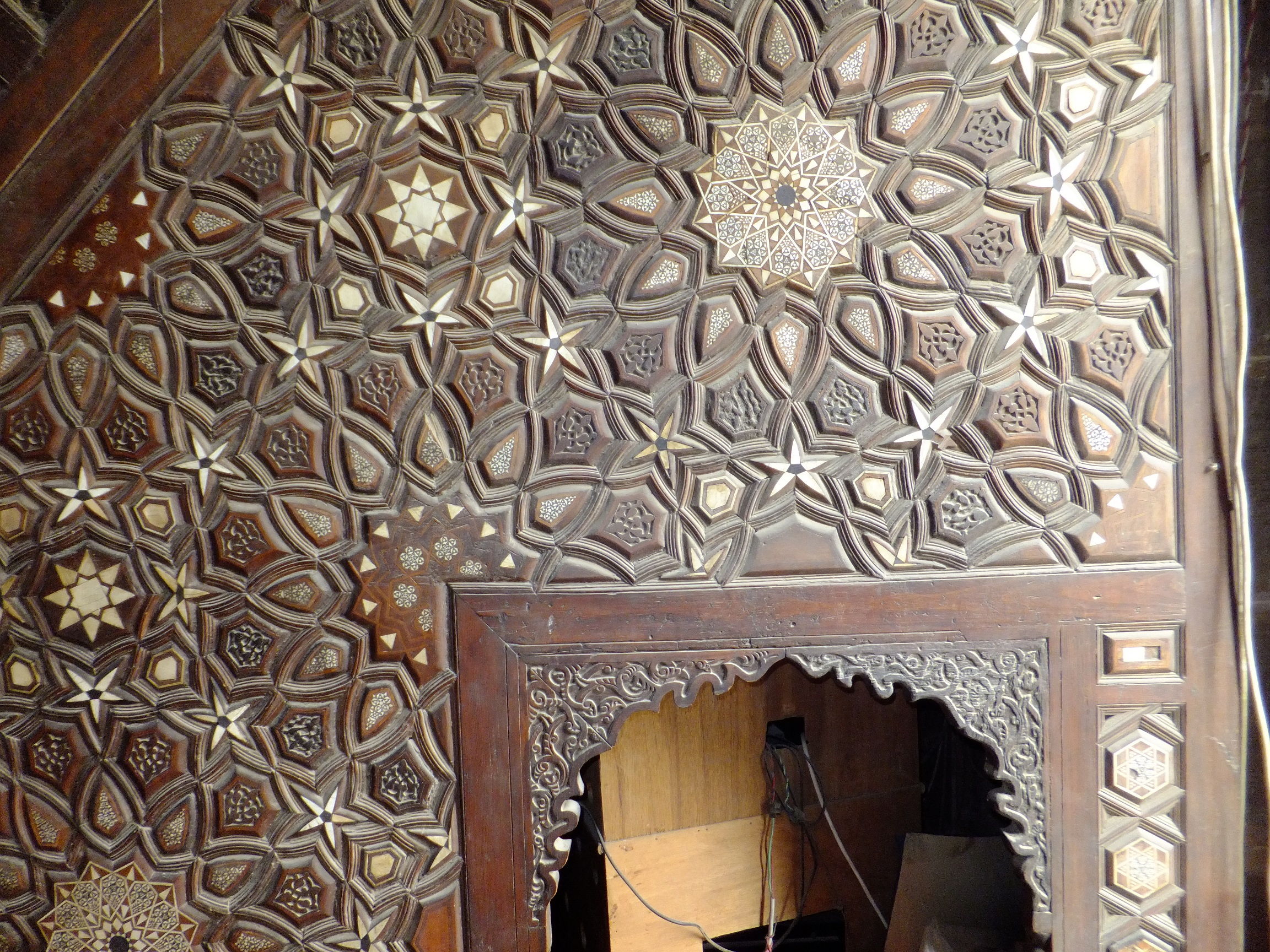
Details of geometric motifs and inlay work on the Mamluk-era Minbar of al-Ghamri (c. 1451) at the Khanqah of Sultan Barsbay, Cairo

In Mamluk Egypt (13th–16th centuries), minbars were crafted following the earlier Syrian tradition. Their decoration is distinguished by the use of bone, ivory, ebony, or mother-of-pearl inlaid into the wood. The geometric patterning of the decoration is further elaborated, using multi-pointed stars whose lines are extended into a wider complex pattern, with arabesques carved inside the various polygons. The canopy at the summit of the minbar was usually topped by a bulbous finial similar to those at the top of minarets. Among the most notable examples is the minbar of the Mosque of Salih Tala'i, dated to 1300, which is also one of the earliest surviving minbars of this period. Another significant example is the minbar in the Mosque of Sultan al-Muayyad, from between 1415 and 1420. One of the finest minbars of the period is the Minbar of al-Ghamri (circa 1451), currently housed in the Khanqah of Sultan Barsbay. This minbar takes the design of decorative geometric patterns slightly further by using curved lines instead of the usual straight lines to form its polygons.

=== Maghreb ===
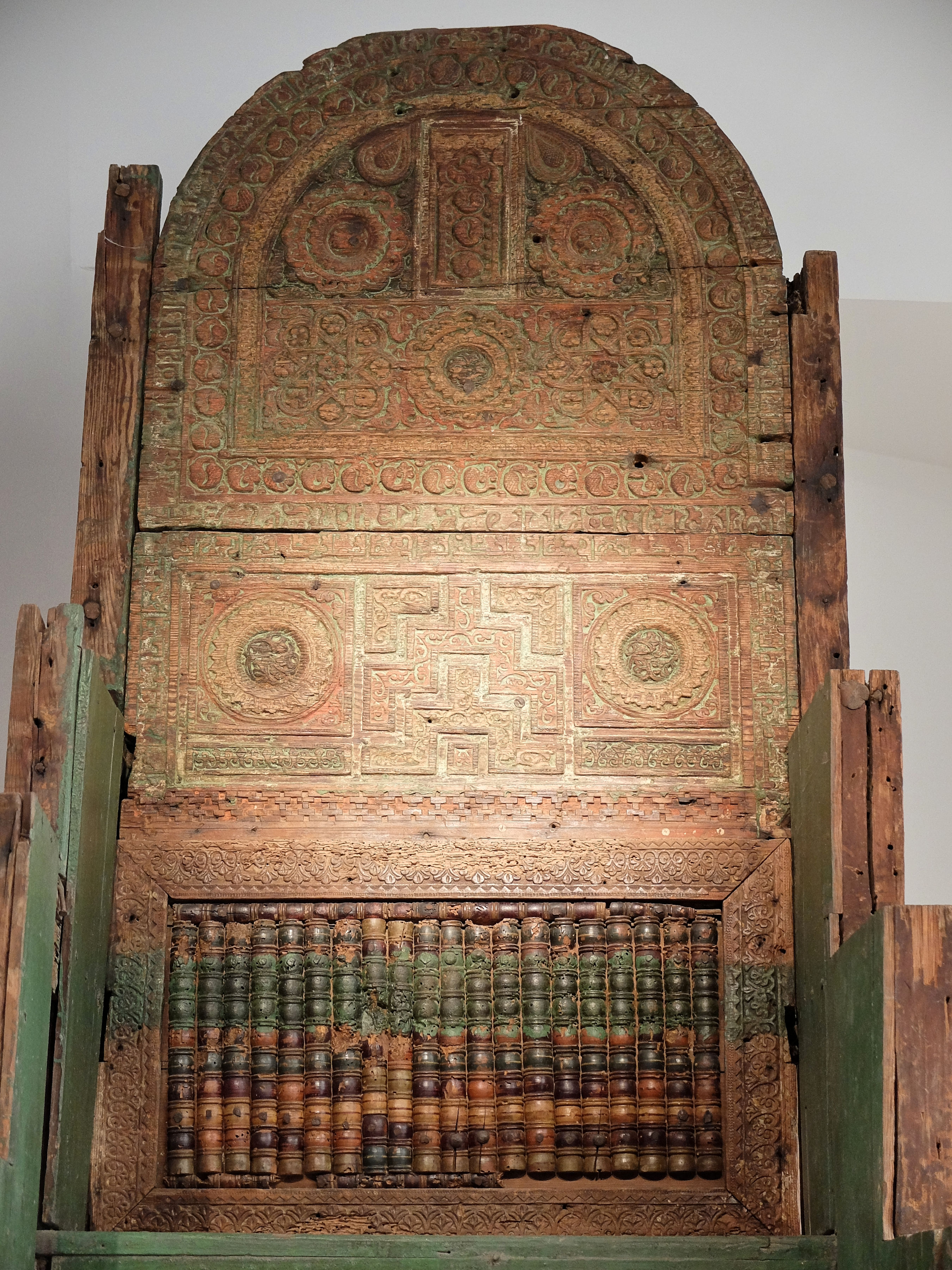
Backrest of the minbar of the Mosque of the Andalusians in Fez, crafted in 980 and 985, with decoration in carved reliefs and turned wood

In the Maghreb, a number of wooden minbars have been preserved from the 10th to 15th centuries. The Great Mosque of Cordoba (in present-day Spain) hosted a famous minbar fabricated circa 975 on the orders of al-Hakam II. It has not survived to the present day, but it was probably emulated by the later minbars in the Maghreb that have been preserved.

Among the oldest surviving examples in the Maghreb, after the minbar of Kairouan, is the minbar of the Mosque of the Andalusians in Fez, which was originally constructed in 980 and is partly preserved today. Its original woodwork is carved with geometric motifs that appear inspired by those of the minbar in Kairouan. When the minbar was modified in 985, some panels were replaced with panels of turned wood using a bow-drill technique. This is one of the earliest examples of this woodworking technique, which later became common in the fabrication of mashrabiyyas (wooden screens and balconies).

The next oldest Maghrebi minbar to survive is that of the Great Mosque of Nedroma, dated to around 1086, but only some fragments of its original structure remain. The minbar of the Great Mosque of Algiers, dated to around 1097, is more substantially preserved and resembles the presumed form of the Cordoba minbar. Its sides are decorated with square panels of vegetal and sometimes geometric motifs.

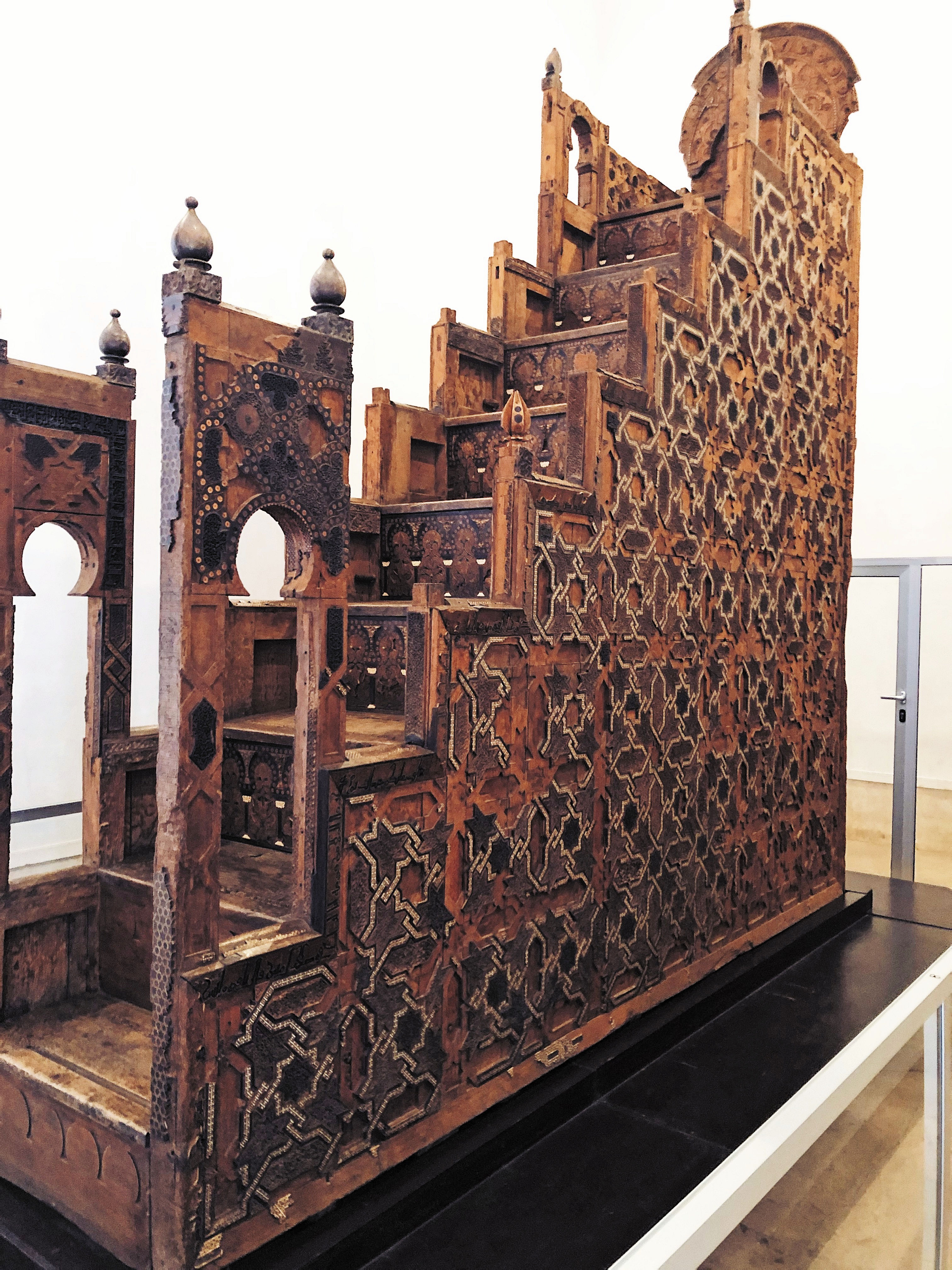
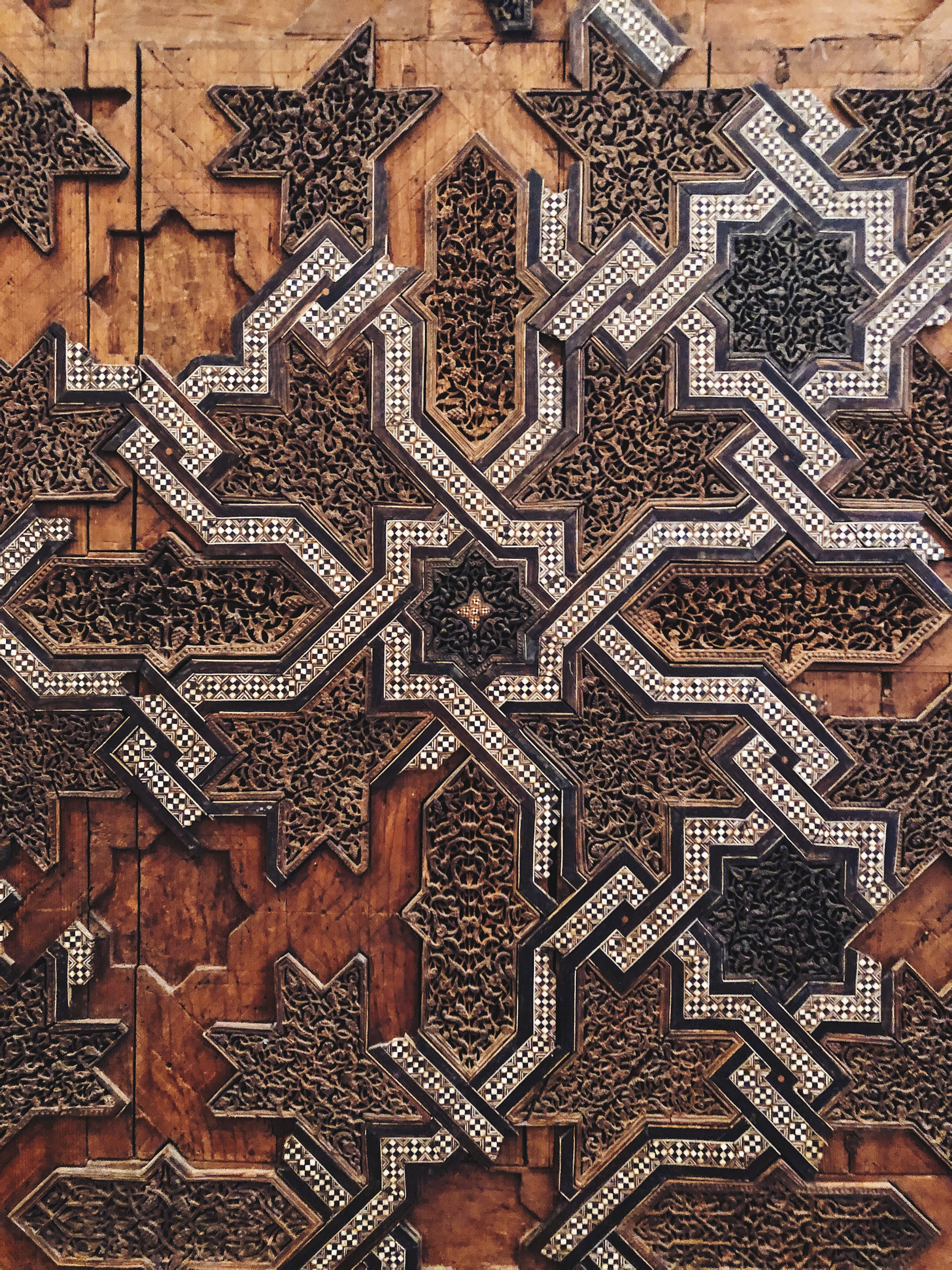
Almoravid Minbar in Marrakesh, commissioned in 1137, now at the Badi Palace Museum. Its surfaces are decorated with a mix of geometric and arabesque motifs in marquetry, inlay, and carving.

The most important surviving minbar of this artistic tradition is the Almoravid minbar in Marrakesh, commissioned in 1137 by Ali ibn Yusuf and completed around 1145. During the Almohad period later that century, it was moved to the Kutubiyya Mosque in the same city. It is housed today in the Badi Palace Museum. The richly crafted minbar was fabricated in Cordoba and may thus provide some hint of the former style and craftsmanship of the Cordoba minbar, in addition to its other structural similarities. The decoration of this minbar, however, is more extravagant and sophisticated than any other surviving examples. It combines geometric and arabesque motifs executed in a mix of marquetry, inlay, and wood carving.

The only other minbar approaching, but not quite matching, the quality of the Almoravid minbar in Marrakesh is the minbar of the Qarawiyyin Mosque, also commissioned by Ali ibn Yusuf and completed in 1144. The other notable minbars produced after this, mostly found in present-day Morocco, generally imitate the style of the earlier Almoravid minbar. These later minbars include the minbar of the Kasbah Mosque in Marrakesh (circa 1189–1195), the minbar of the Mosque of the Andalusians following its Almohad renovation (circa 1203–1209), the minbar of the Great Mosque of Fes el-Jdid (circa 1276), the minbar of the Great Mosque of Taza (circa 1290–1300), and the minbar of the Bou Inania Madrasa in Fez (between 1350 and 1355). Even the much later minbar of the Mouassine Mosque in Marrakesh (between 1562 and 1573) continues to show imitations of the same tradition.

=== Iran ===
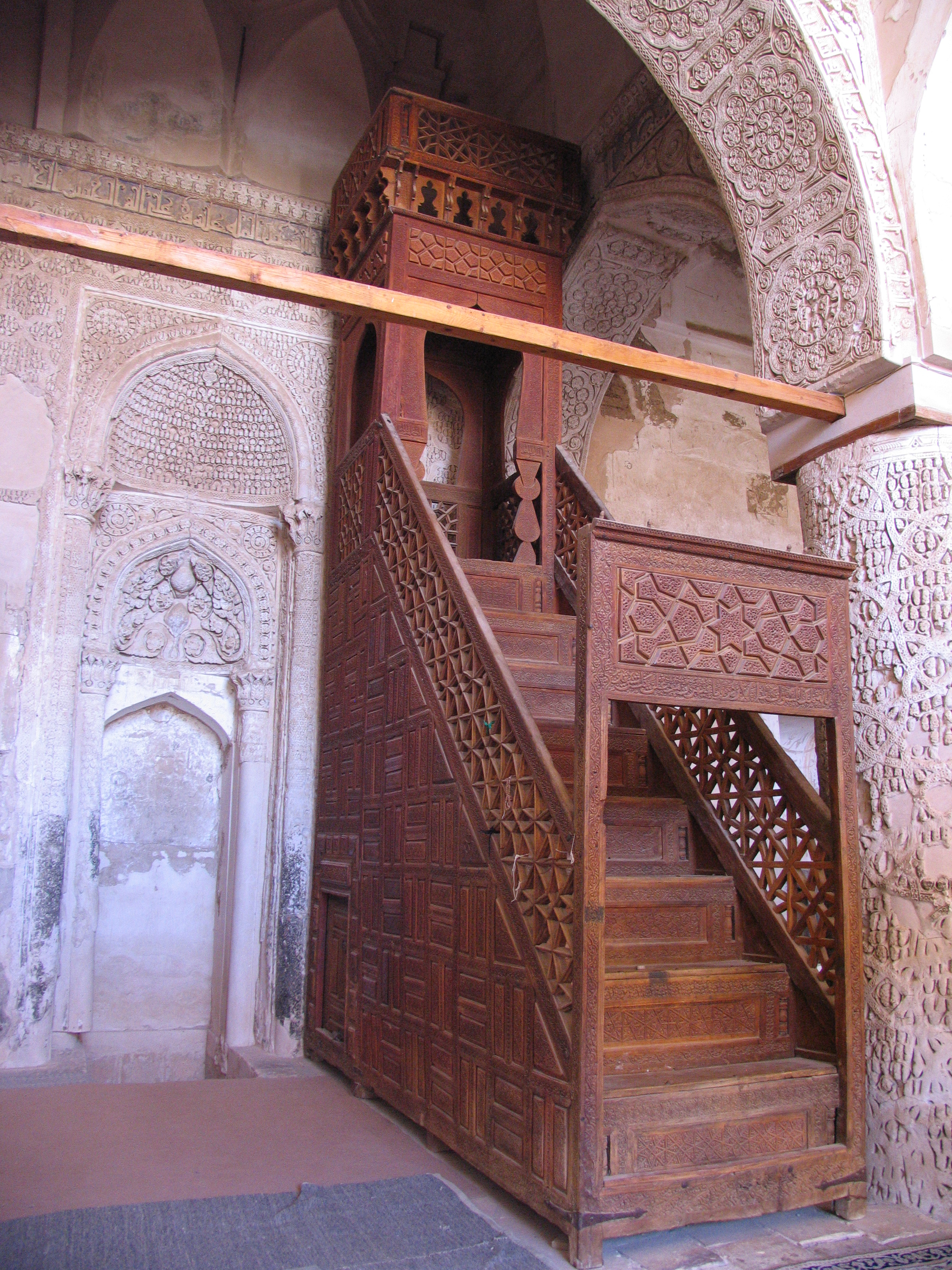
Ilkhanid-era minbar in the Great Mosque of Na'in in Iran (1311)

Iranian minbars typically have no canopy or dome at the top, distinguishing them from minbars in other regions. In Iran, Mesopotomia, and Anatolia, some wooden minbars preserved from the 11th and 12th centuries are carved with vegetal beveled-style motifs. Most other early minbars in Iran and Afghanistan were destroyed during the Mongol invasions of the 13th century.

The most significant minbars preserved from the Ilkhanid period (13th–14th centuries) include those in the Great Mosque of Na'in (1311) and in the prayer hall added by Uljaytu to the Great Mosque of Isfahan. Both are wooden structures, with the former's flanks decorated by rectangular panels with beveled motifs and the latter's flanks decorated by octagonal geometric motifs. The minbar in Na'in is also one of the few Iranian minbars topped by a canopy.

From the subsequent Timurid period, the most important example is the minbar of the Mosque of Gowhar Shad in Mashhad, fabricated between 1336 and 1446. It shares the overall form of the minbar in Na'in and, like the latter, it also stands apart from other Iranian minbars in having a canopy. Its decoration is distinguished by a carpet-like geometric pattern filled with carvings of tendrils.

== Stone minbars ==
In the central Islamic lands, stone or marble minbars were occasionally produced at an early period, as with some examples in Mamluk Cairo, but they are generally characteristic of the later Ottoman period. Compared to the earlier traditions of wooden minbars, stone minbars were often simpler in their decoration.

=== Mamluk period ===
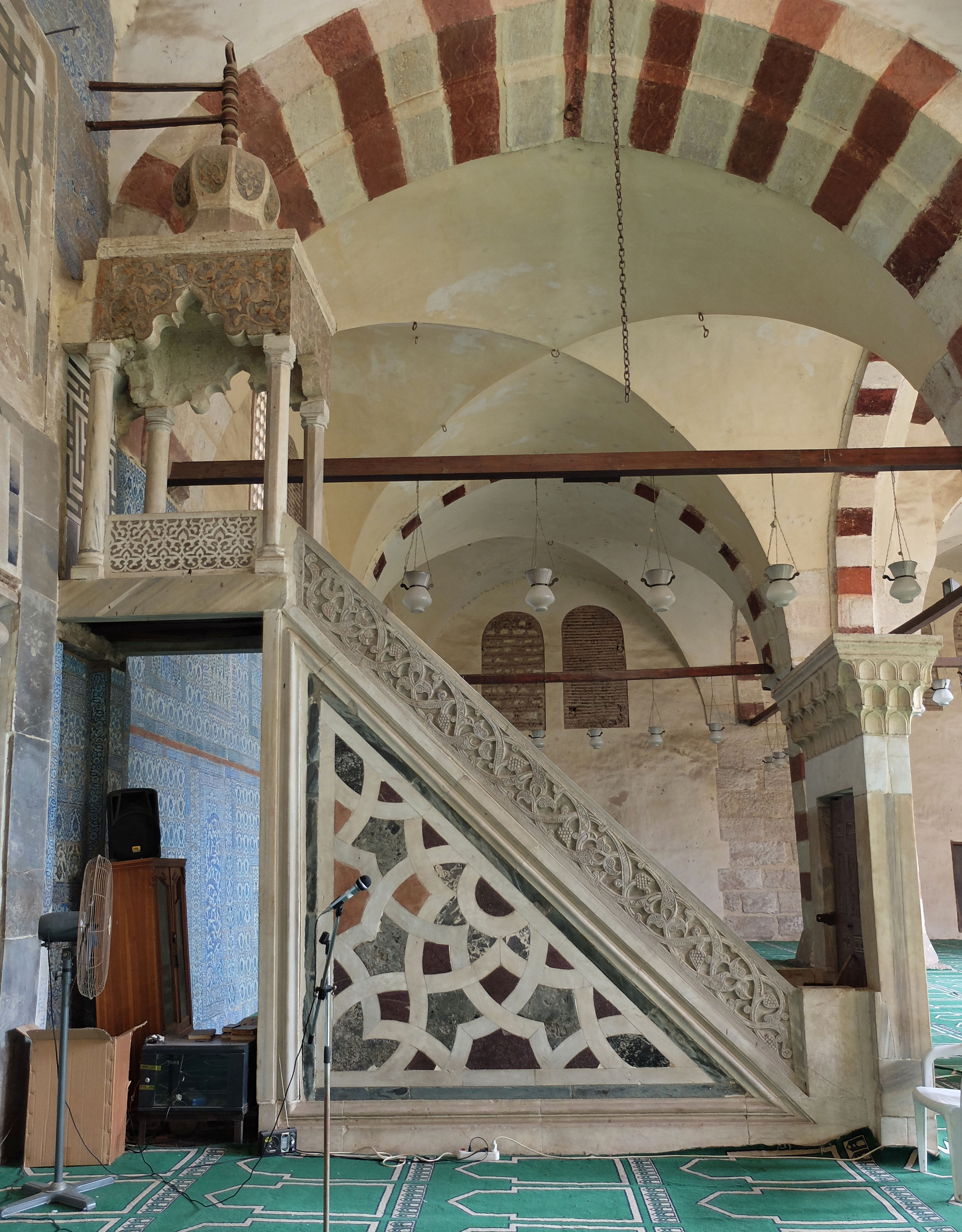
Marble minbar of the Mamluk-era Aqsunqur Mosque in Cairo (circa 1347)

One of the few early marble minbars of Mamluk Cairo is found in the Aqsunqur Mosque in Cairo (circa 1347). Its marble surfaces are decorated with other stone materials of different colors inside an interlacing pattern formed by bands of marble. A marble minbar was also constructed for the earlier Mosque of Ulmas al-Hajib (1329–1330). Only fragments of it have been preserved (kept at the Museum of Islamic Art in Cairo), but they attest to some of the highest-quality stonework from the Mamluk period. The stone minbar of the Mosque of Sultan Hasan in Cairo (circa 1360) is relatively plain, though it has unusually ornate bronze doors. In the next century, Sultan Qaytbay gifted a stone minbar to the Khanqah of Faraj ibn Barquq in 1483. This one is covered with geometric motifs carved to resemble the traditional style of wooden minbars.

=== Ottoman period ===
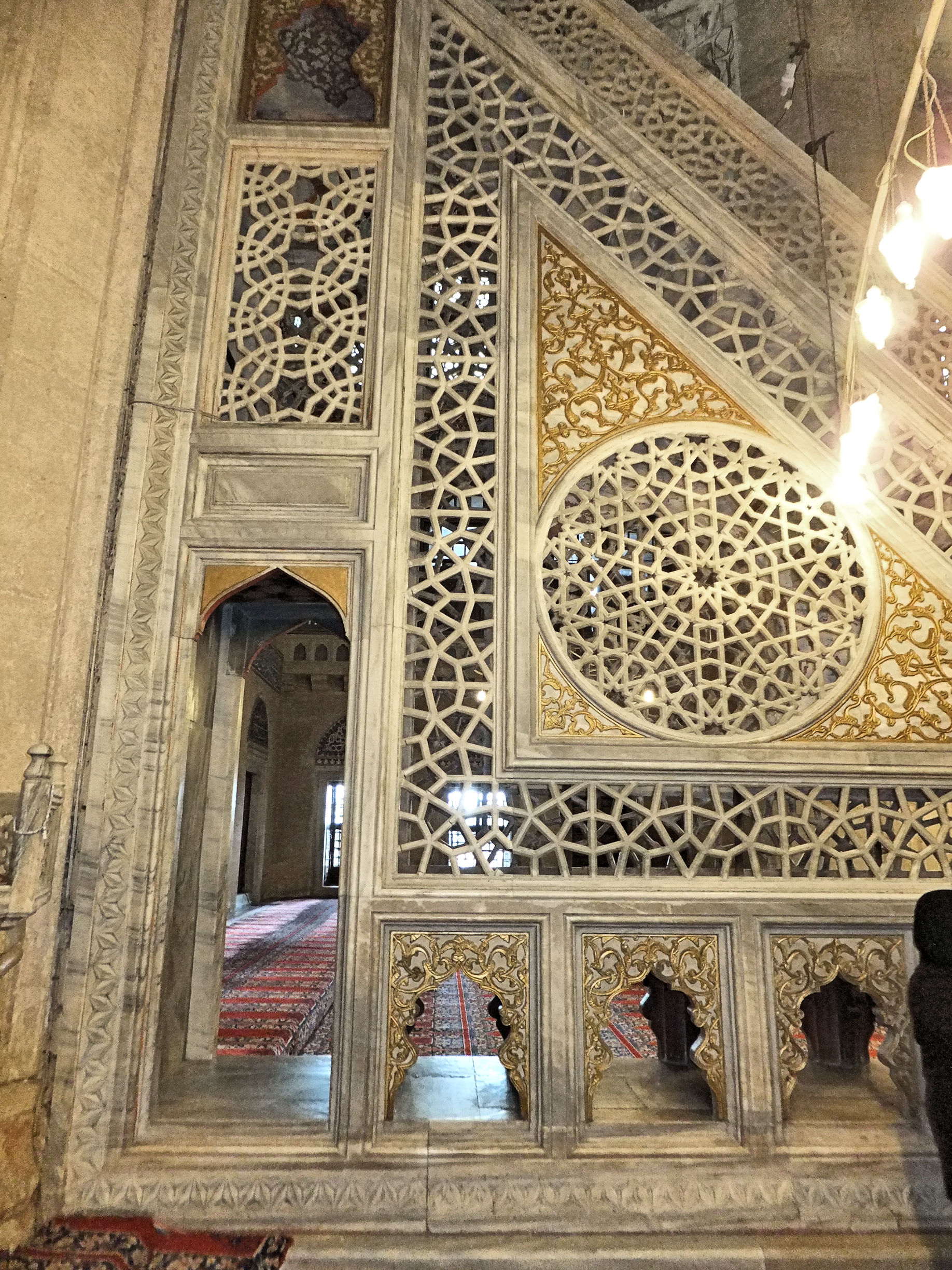
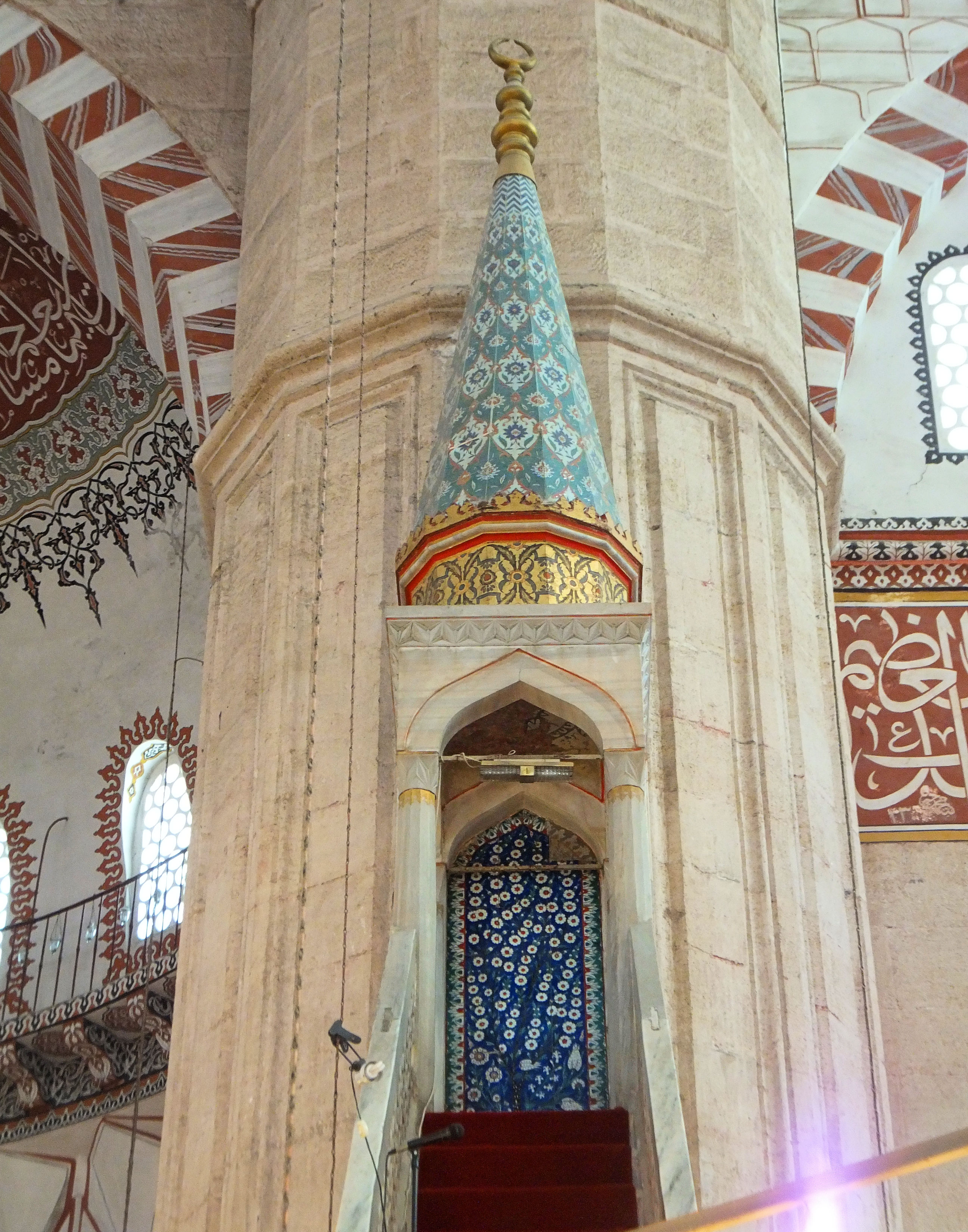
Ottoman-era minbar of the Selimiye Mosque in Edirne (circa 1574). This marble minbar is pierced with geometric openwork and has a typical Ottoman conical cap.

Ottoman minbars are distinguished in part by the shape of their canopy, where the traditional small dome is replaced with a tall, polygonal cone similar to the caps of Ottoman minarets. An exceptional early minbar is that of the Ahmed Pasha Mosque in Amasya, which has extensive finely carved floral decoration. In the finest Ottoman minbars, the main flanks are pierced with geometric openwork and arcades. The apogee of this style is exemplified by the minbar of the Selimiye Mosque in Edirne (circa 1574). The conical cap of this minbar is also covered with decorative tiles, a feature shared with the slightly earlier minbar of the Sokollu Mehmed Pasha Mosque. In later centuries, following the introduction of the Ottoman Baroque style, minbars were carved with eclectic motifs inspired by the European Baroque.

=== Indian subcontinent ===
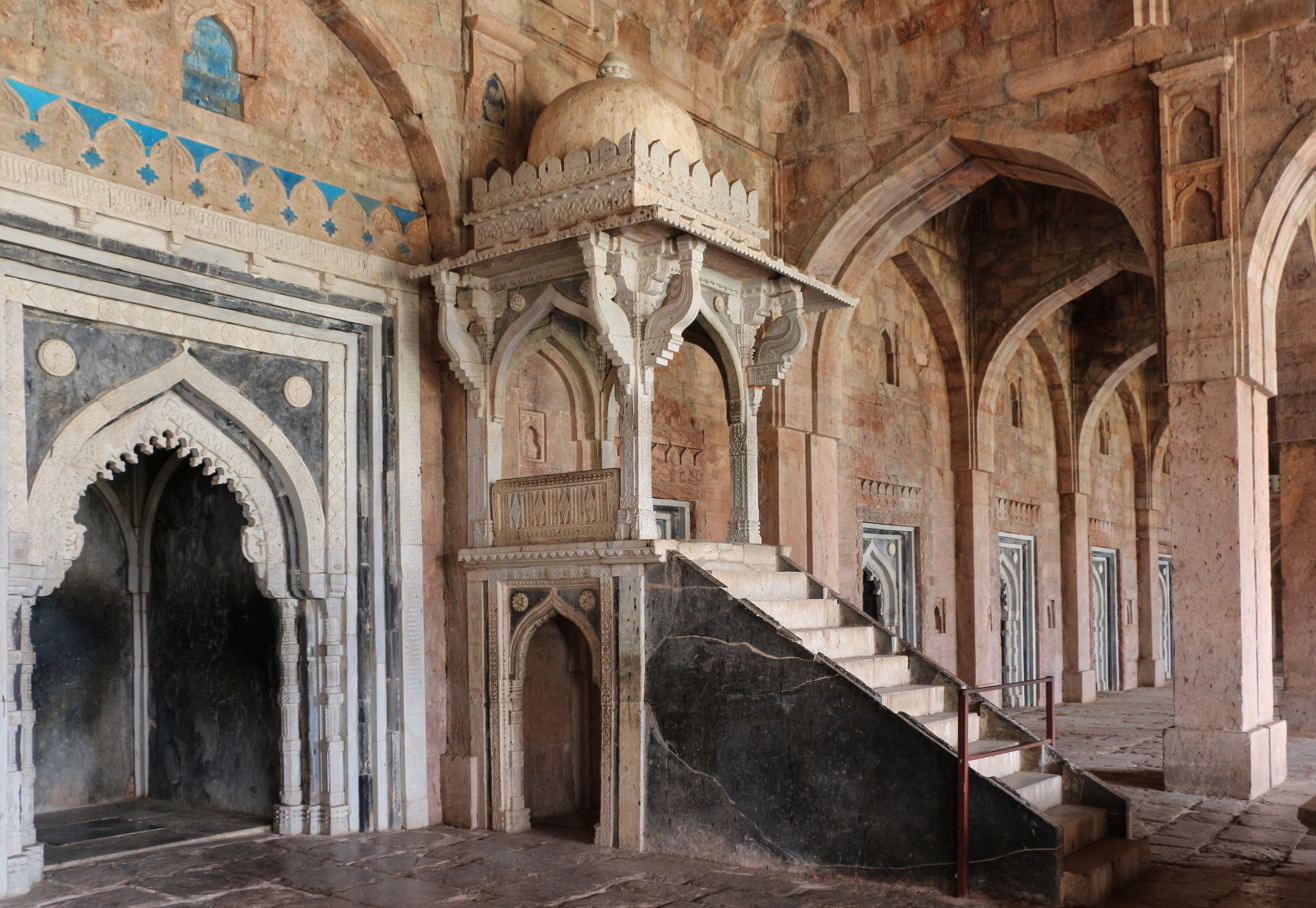
Minbar of the Friday Mosque in Mandu, India (circa 1454)

Minbars were highly variable in style and size on the Indian subcontinent, but stone was the favoured material throughout the region. Wooden minbars may have been employed in earlier periods, but few or none have been preserved. Some of the minbars are merely a series of simple steps while others are very elaborate.

Among other variations, the minbars of the Bengal Sultanate and the Gujarat Sultanate typically have canopies, while those of the Jaunpur Sultanate and Mughal Empire usually do not. One of the most elegant examples of the canopied type is the minbar in the Friday Mosque of Mandu in the Malwa region, dated to 1454, which has a dome in the local style upheld by curving brackets. In both the Gujarat and Malwa regions, the first step of the minbar is often preceded by a small square platform whose original purpose is unclear.

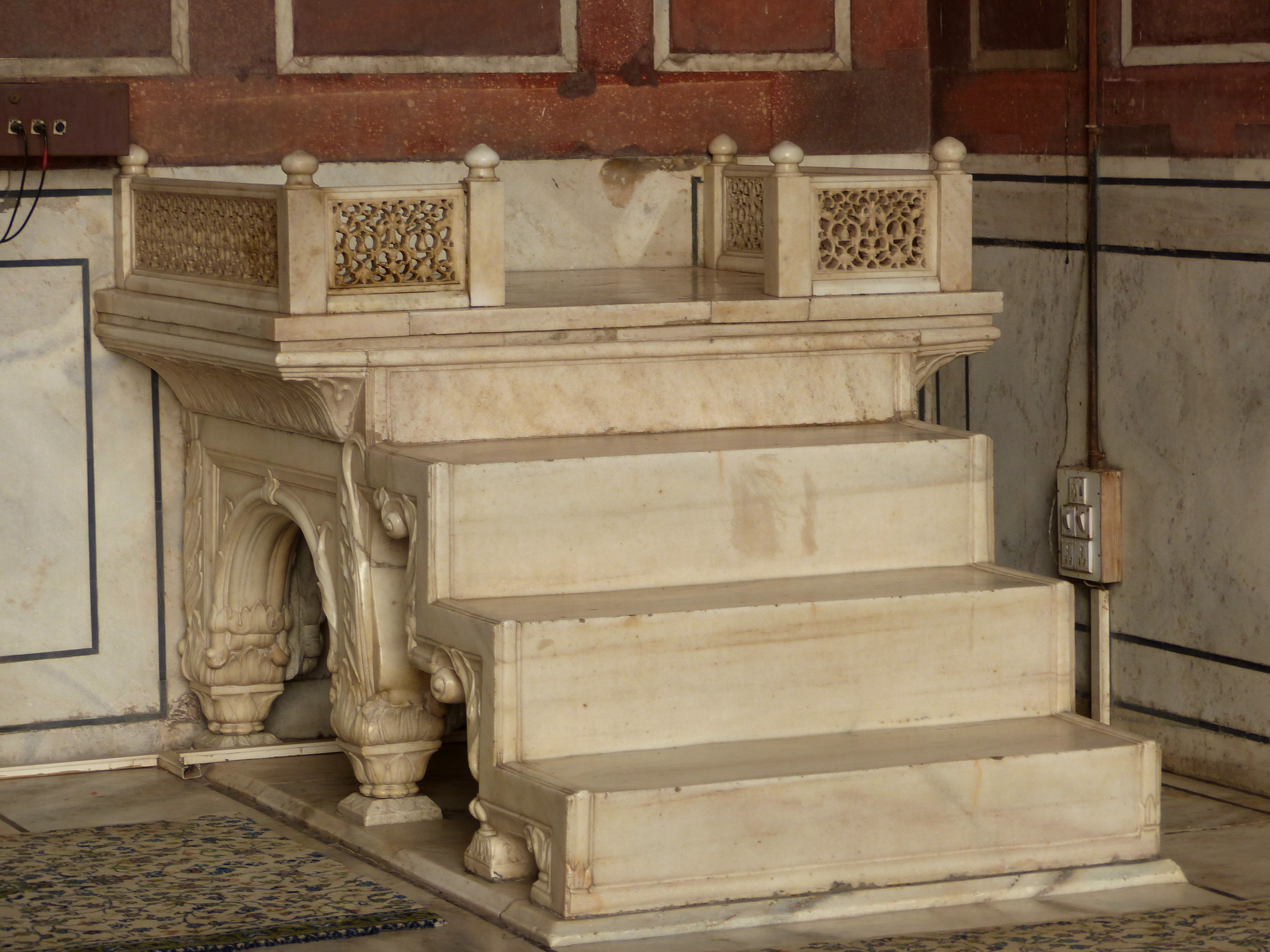
The Mughal-era minbar of the Friday Mosque in Delhi (17th century) is an example of a minbar without a canopy.

In the Deccan, the minbar is usually a plain staircase of three steps. In the Mughal Empire, some minbars also had a simple design form with three steps, but they sometimes had flourishes such as a highly polished or inlaid marble finish (especially under Shah Jahan) or a pierced stone balustrade.

== See also ==
- Bema
