= Aqsunqur Mosque =

Mosque in Cairo, Egypt

- مسجد آق سنقر / مسجد إبراهيم أغا مستحفظان
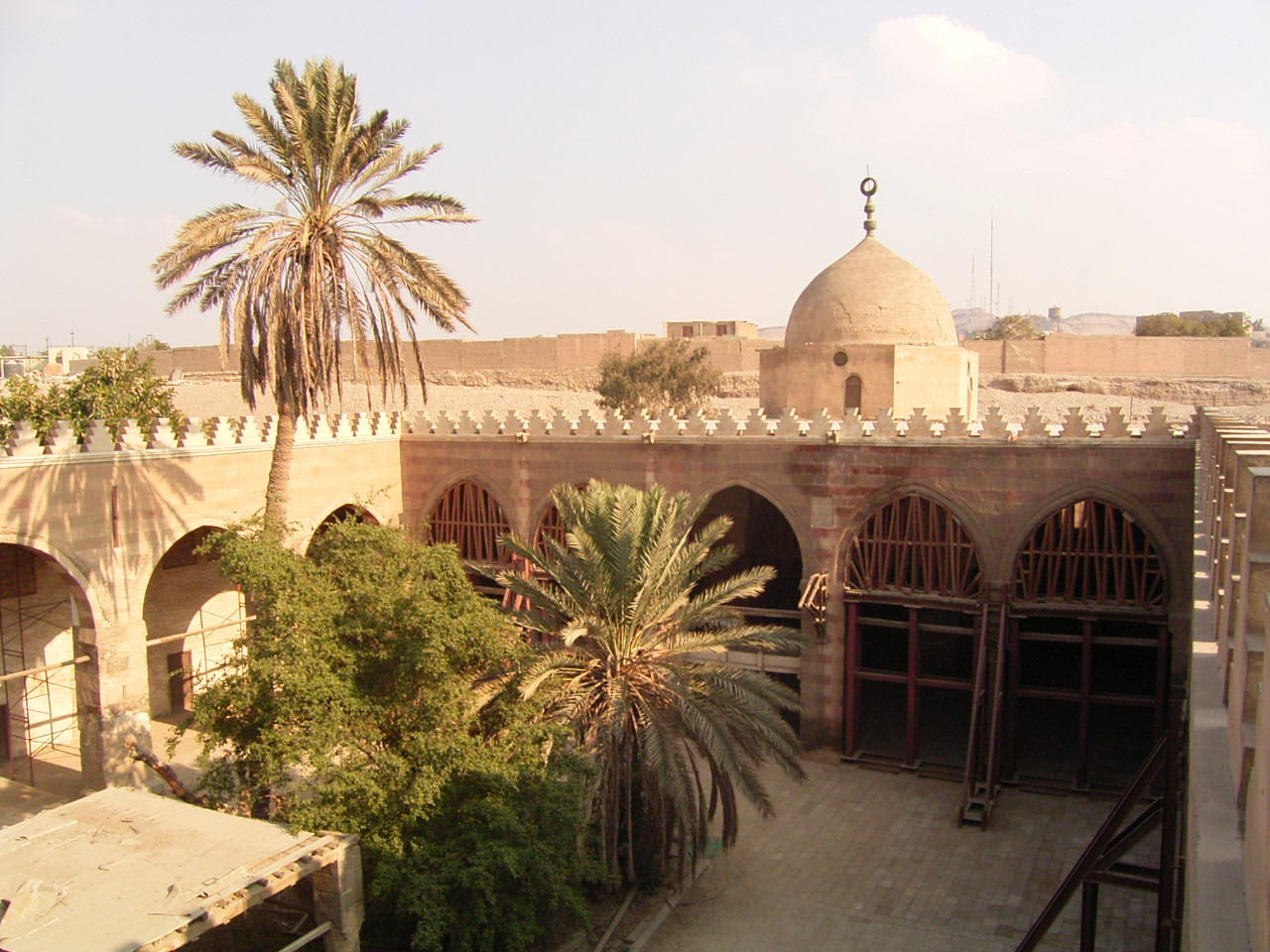
- The sahn

Religion
- Affiliation: Islam
- Ecclesiastical or organisational status: Mosque and mausoleum
- Status: Active

Location
- Location: Bab el-Wazir Street, Darb al-Ahmar, Islamic Cairo
- Country: Egypt
- Interactive map of Aqsunqur Mosque
- Coordinates: 30°02′10″N 31°15′36″E

Architecture
- Type: Mosque
- Style: Mamluk; Ottoman
- Founder: Shams ad-Din Aqsunqur
- Completed: 1347 (original); 1652 (current)

Specifications
- Dome: 5
- Minaret: 1
- Materials: Stalactite, brick, wood, marble

The Aqsunqur Mosque (Arabic: مسجد آق سنقر), also known as the Blue Mosque (Arabic: الجامع الأزرق), or the Mosque of Ibrahim Agha (Arabic: مسجد إبراهيم أغا مستحفظان), is a mosque located in Islamic Cairo, Egypt. The mosque is situated in the Tabbana Quarter of Darb al-Ahmar district, between Bab Zuweila and the Citadel of Cairo.

The Aqsunqur Mosque also serves as a funerary complex, containing the mausoleums of its founder Shams ad-Din Aqsunqur, his sons, a number of children of the Bahri Mamluk sultan an-Nasir Muhammad and that of its principal restorer, Ibrahim Agha al-Mustahfizan.

== History ==
=== Construction under Mamluks ===
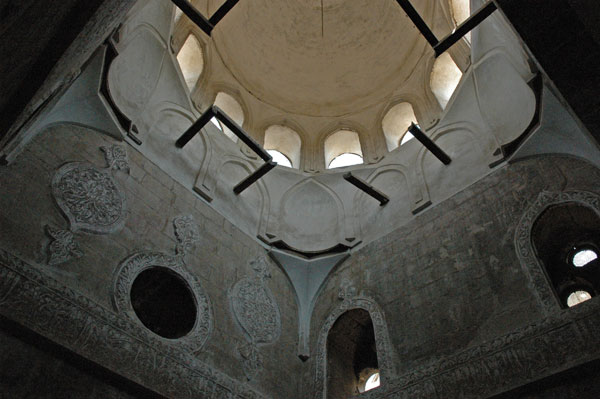
Dome of Kujuk's mausoleum

The mosque was completed in 1347 on the orders of the emir Shams ad-Din Aqsunqur during the reign of the Mamluk sultan, al-Muzaffar Hajji. Aqsunqur was the son-in-law of former sultan an-Nasir Muhammad and one of the more prominent emirs of the latter's court. Aqsunqur's influence in the affairs of the sultanate grew during the reign of an-Nasir's successors following his death in 1340.

Medieval Muslim historian al-Maqrizi noted Aqsunqur supervised the entire project and also participated in its actual construction. Being the former governor of Tripoli, he had the mosque built in a Syrian architectural style. It was built around the late sultan al-Ashraf Kujuk's mausoleum which had been constructed previously in 1341. The mausoleum's incorporation within the mosque accounts for the irregularity of the building's structure. Aqsunqur's grave is also located in the mosque complex along with those of his sons.

By the 15th century the Aqsunqur Mosque was reportedly in poor shape due to the loss of waqf ("religious endowments") funds from Syria. In 1412 a şadirvan ("ablution fountain") was built in the center of the courtyard by the Mamluk emir Tughan. Because funding was low, the Aqsunqur Mosque was used only for Friday prayers and religious holidays.

=== Restoration by Ottomans ===
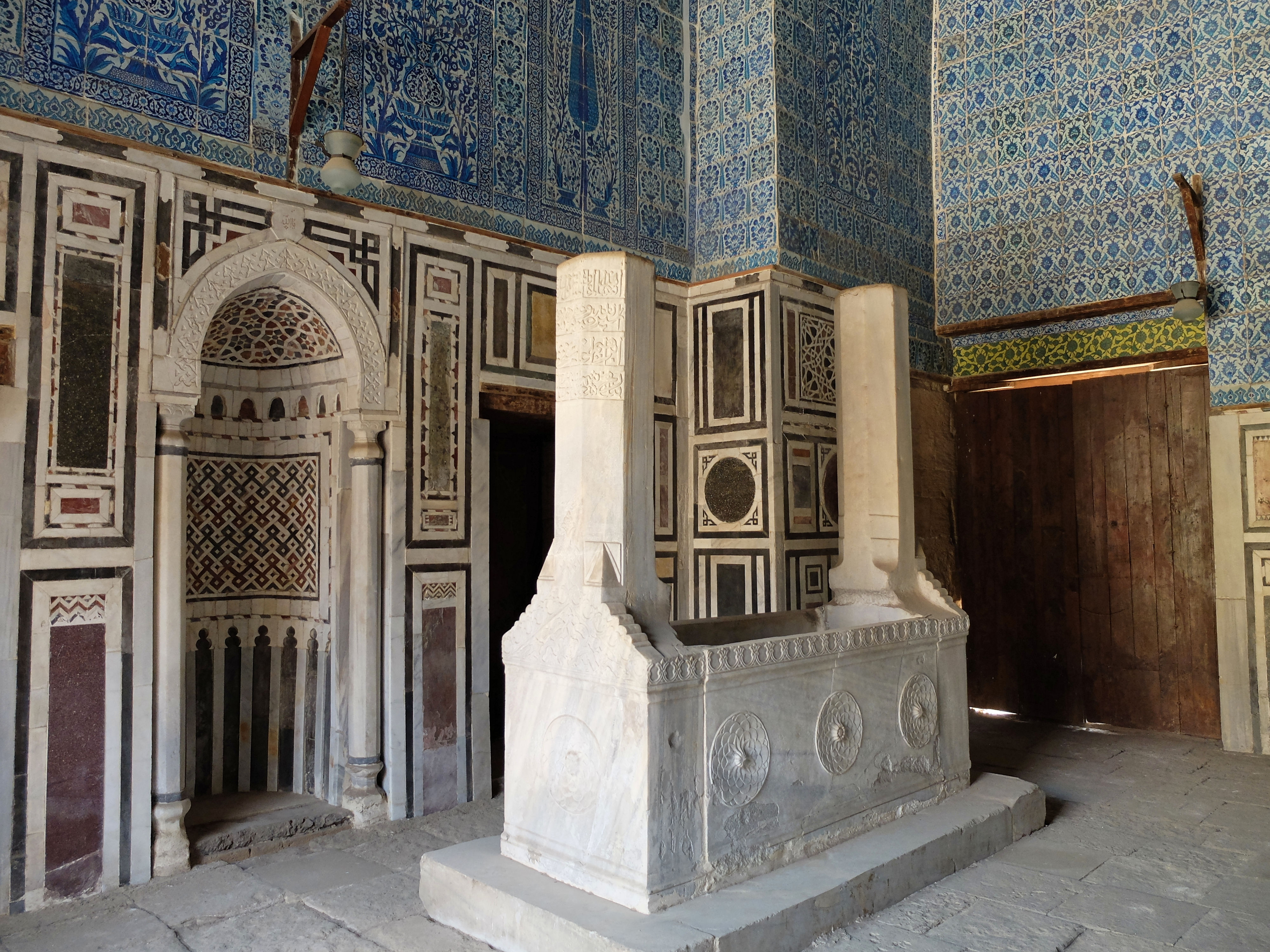
Tomb of Ibrahim Agha al-Mustahfizan (17th century)

Between 1652 and 1654, during Ottoman rule, the emir Ibrahim Agha al-Mustahfizan, who was a general of the Janissaries, began a major renovation project for the Aqsunqur Mosque, restoring its roof and arcades, and adding columns to support the mosque's southern prayer hall. Significantly, he decorated the building with blue and green tiles, hence the mosque's unofficial name as the "Blue Mosque". The tiles, which were imported from Constantinople and Damascus, were crafted in the Iznik style with floral motifs such as cypress trees and vases holding tulips.

Ibrahim Agha built his mausoleum, which was also decorated with marble tiles, in the southern hall. It was constructed using the typical Mamluk architectural style and included a mihrab ("prayer niche") resembling the mausoleums of Mamluk emirs also located in the mosque complex. In line with Ottoman tradition at the time, the Aqsunqur Mosque was officially renamed after its restorer as the "Ibrahim Agha Mosque." The latter name was not used frequently.

=== Modern era ===
In 1908 the Aqsunqur Mosque was restored by the Comité de Conservation des Monuments de l'Art Arabe. The 1992 Cairo earthquake damaged the arches of the mosque's porticoes, but they were reinforced by the Egyptian government in the mid-1990s to prevent additional deterioration.

The Aga Khan Trust for Culture (AKTC) in conjunction with the World Monuments Fund began a restoration project of the mosque in 2009. The Mosque opened to the public in May 2015 after the completion of a six-year renovation project. The mosque was inaugurated in the presence of Antiquities Minister Mamdouh el-Damaty, the Aga Khan, the Chairman of the Aga Khan Development Network, and Cairo governor Galal Saeed.

Renovation work focused on structural stability, conservation of the interior and roof repair. Today, the Aqsunqur Mosque is a major destination for tourists visiting Egypt.

== Architecture ==
=== Exterior ===
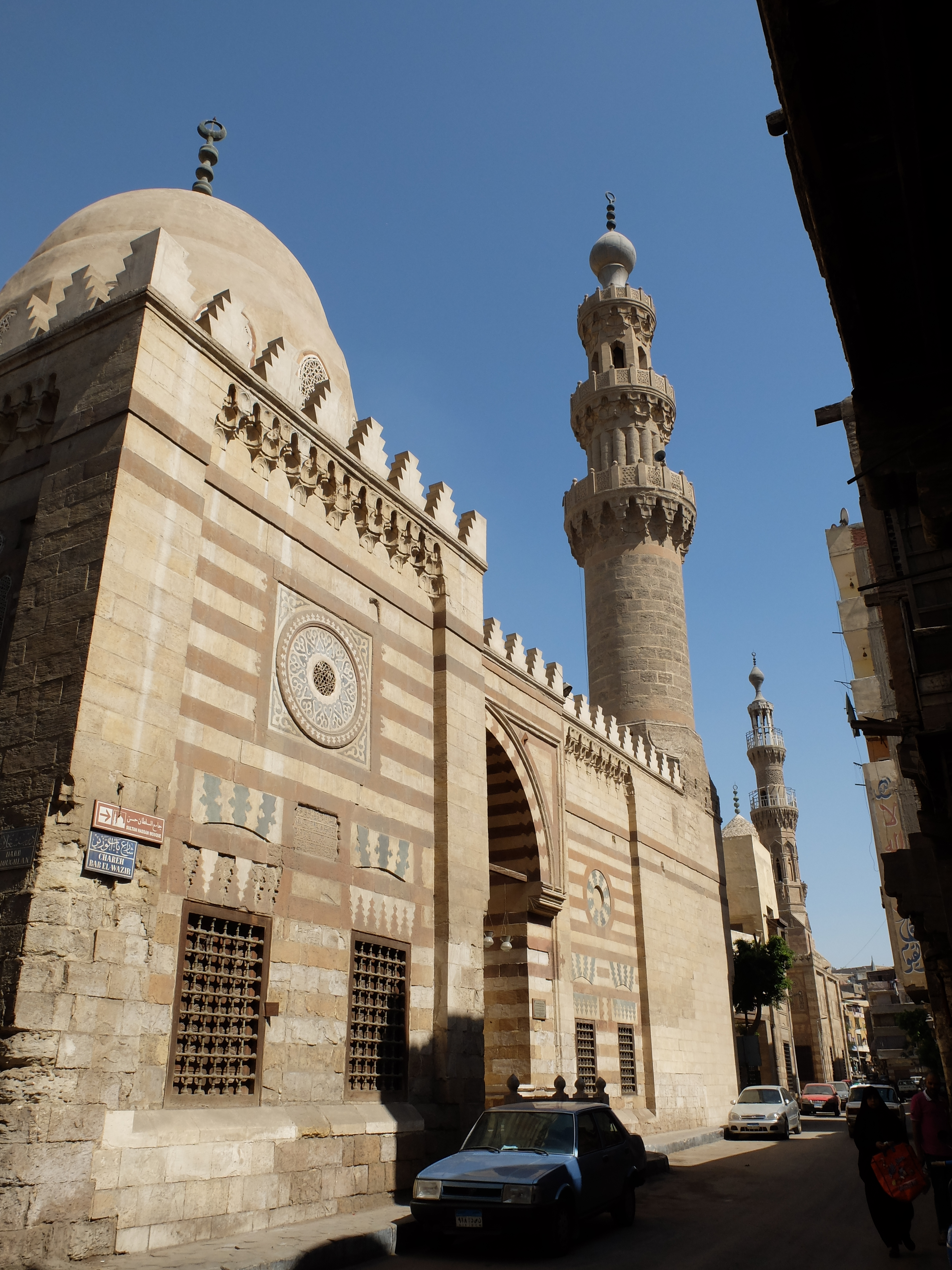
Exterior, with the domed mausoleum of Kujuk on the left and the minaret on the right

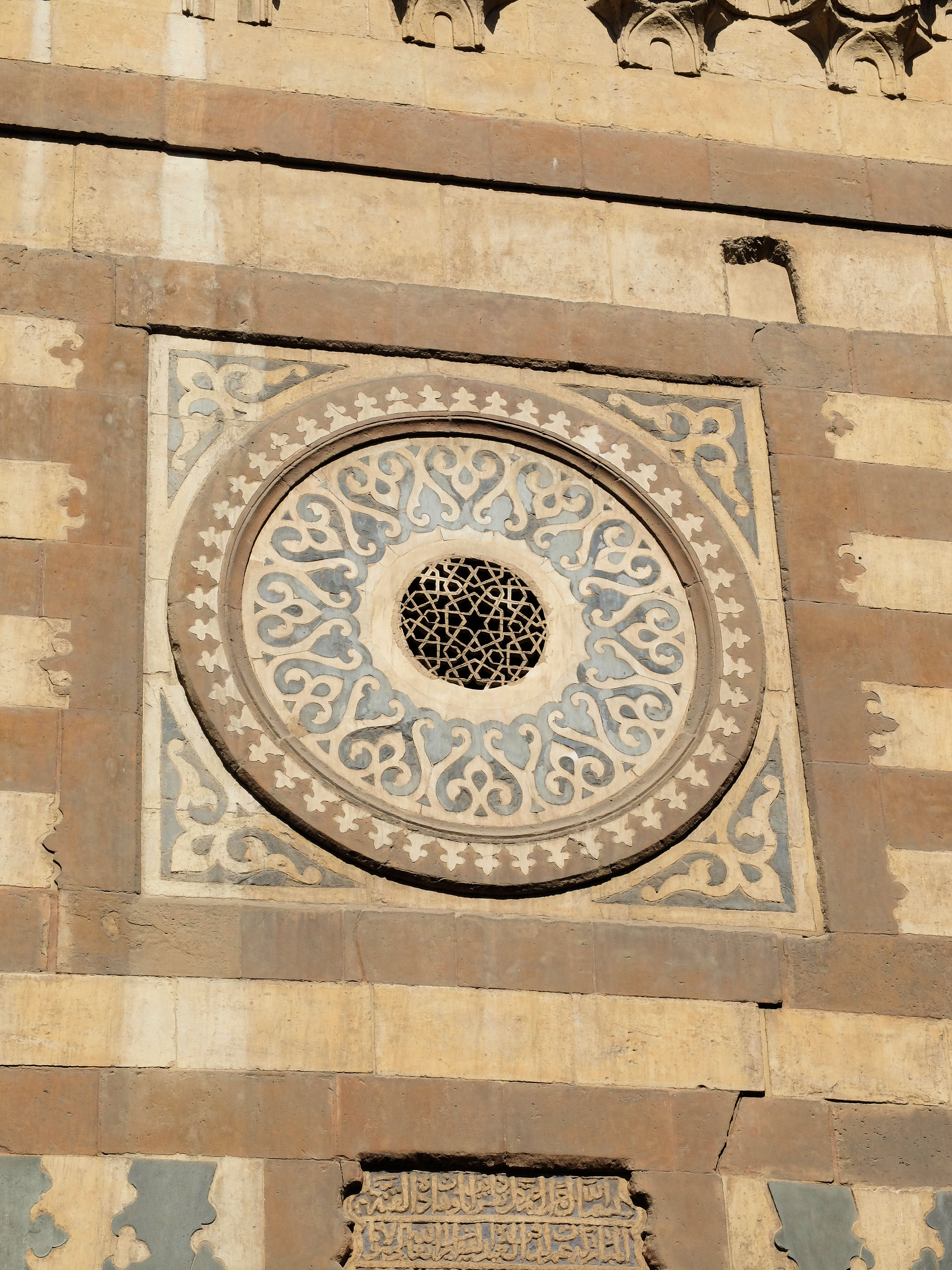
Polychrome stonework on the exterior of the mausoleum

The general layout of the mosque consists of a large open sahn enclosed by four riwaqs. There are three main entrances with the main portal opening into the western arcade. The latter consists of a large pointed arch with corbels on the front edges of its roof. Facing the courtyard is the dikka from which the Qur'an is recited. The structure uses Western European-style capitals that Islamic architecture expert Doris Behrens-Abouseif believes were taken from Crusader-era structures in the Levant.

Kujuk's mausoleum is situated at the portal's northern side and has two facades facing the street. Of the two alternative entrances, one opens into the southern arcade while the other opens between the northern and western arcades. Unlike other tombs in Cairo, Kujuk's mausoleum, which predates the mosque, is not aligned according to the qibla ("orientation with Mecca") and instead is aligned with the street. This structure is the principal feature unique to other major mosques in Egypt.

Above the prayer hall sits a brick one-bay dome carried on four brick squinches. A large brick dome supported by brick squinches is also situated atop the mausoleum of Kujuk. However, the latter has a pendentive below each squinch. When the mosque was originally built this technique of using plain squinches was considered archaic.

=== Interior ===
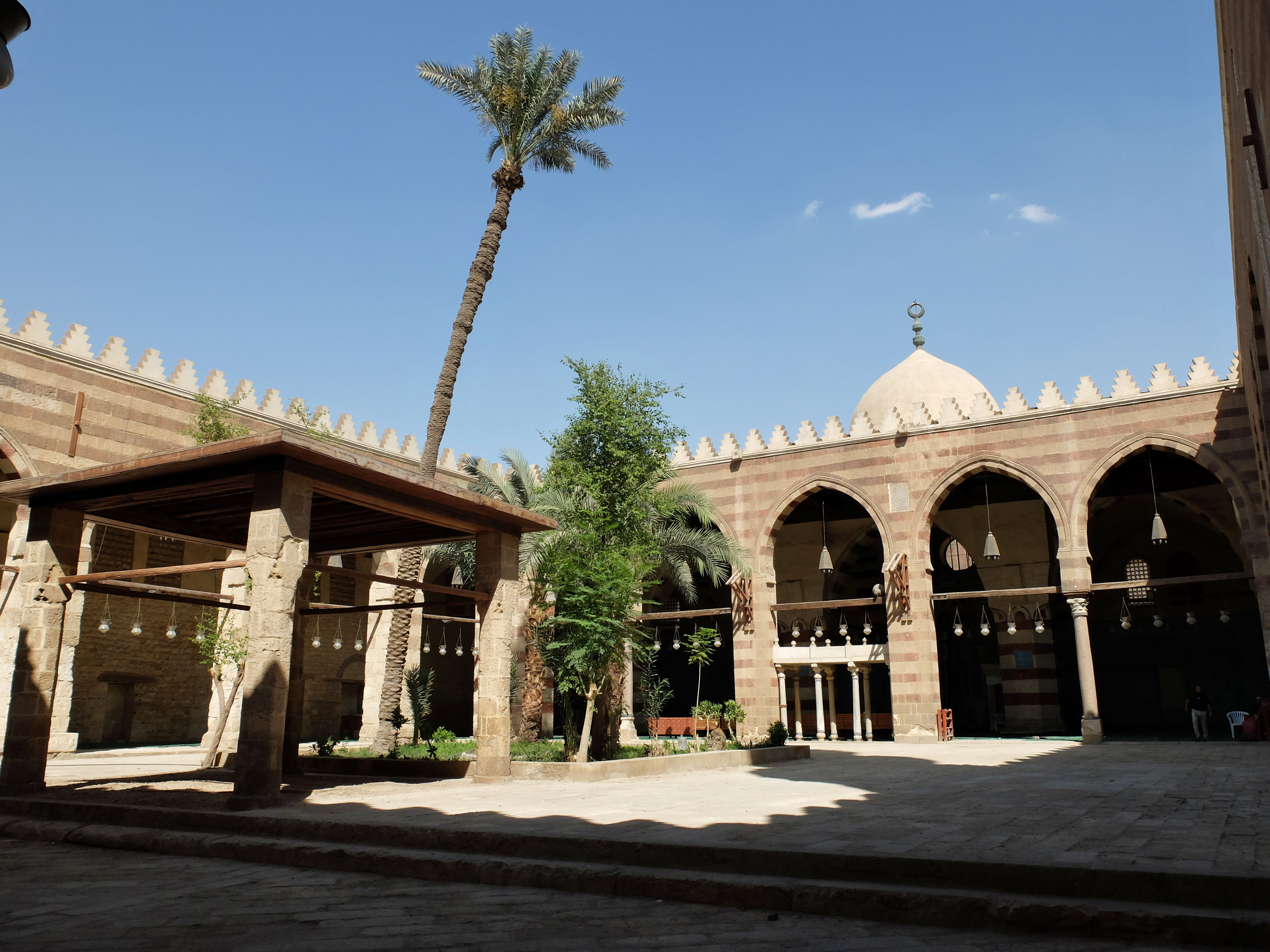
Courtyard of the mosque (looking east, with prayer hall on the right)

The mosque's interior also has an irregular layout mostly due to Ibrahim Agha's renovations which replaced most of the original cross-vaulting of the arcades with columns supporting a flat wooden ceiling. The only part of the mosque that continues to employ Aqsunqur's interior design is the qibla wall which uses cross-vaults that rest on octagonal-shaped piers. The technique of cross-vaults is a reflection of Islamic Syrian architectural influence. Along with the Mosque of Amir al-Maridani, the Aqsunqur Mosque has a hypostyle plan which is rare in Cairo and typically associated with Syrian style mosques.

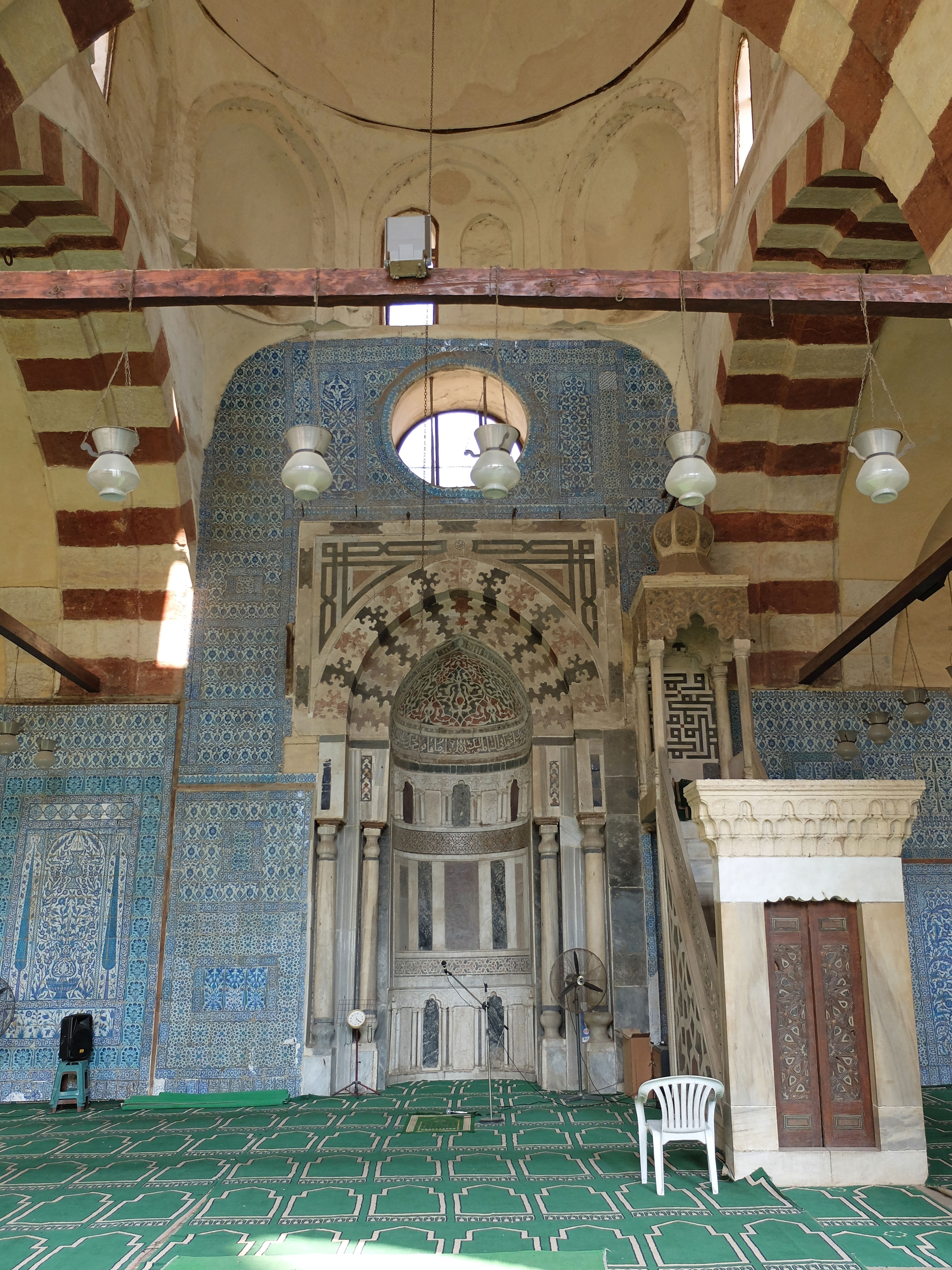
Mihrab (center) and minbar (right) of the mosque, surrounded by Iznik tiles from the 17th-century Ottoman renovation

The mihrab was built in a geometric interlace style typically found in Mamluk architecture. The design is used in the mihrab's spandrels. Other features of the mihrab include the hood's relief painted carvings, fluctuating lintel panels, marble panels, carved marble registers and mosaic inlay. To the right of the mihrab is the marble minbar. Decorated with light grey, salmon, green and plum-colored stone inserts, it is the oldest and one of the handful remaining marble minbars used in a Cairo mosque. The handrail is also built of marble and has a pattern of rolling leaf and grape clusters carved from the stone.

=== Minaret ===
The minaret is situated at the southern corner of the facade looking into Bab al-Wazir Street, affording a dominant view of the entire southern part of the street. It consists of three stories, the first being circular and plain and the second circular and ribbed while the top story is a bulb resting on a pavilion supported by eight slender stone columns. Its circular shaft is rare among Mamluk minarets. Prior to its 20th-century restoration, the minaret had four stories. The third story was octagonal and removed during the restoration, depriving the Aqsunqur Mosque a unique feature it shared with another mosque in Cairo, the Sultan al-Ghuri Complex which has four stories. The Aqsunqur Mosque minaret was featured in several 19th-century illustrations.

== See also ==
- Islam in Egypt
- List of mausoleums in Egypt
- List of mosques in Cairo
- Timeline of Islamic history
- Late medieval domes

== Bibliography ==
- Behrens-Abouseif, Doris (1989), Architecture of the Bahri Mamluks (PDF document), BRILL
- Williams, Caroline (2008), Islamic monuments in Cairo, American University of Cairo Press, ISBN 978-9774162053
