= Jama Masjid, Mandu =

Mosque in Mandu, Madhya Pradesh, India

Jama Masjid
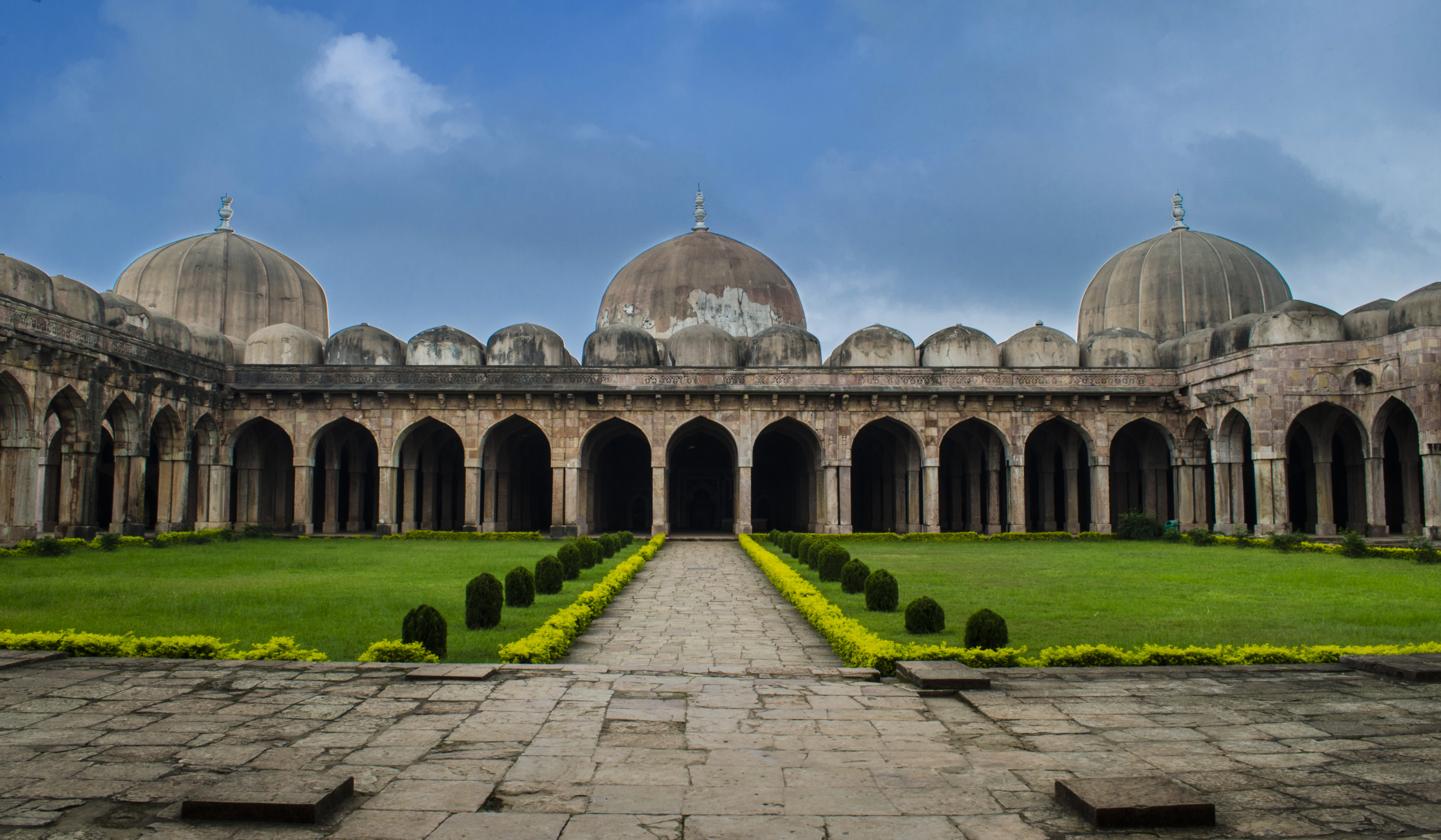
- Courtyard of Jama Masjid, in 2012

- Location of the mosque in Madhya Pradesh

Religion
- Affiliation: Sunni Islam
- Ecclesiastical or organisational status: Mosque
- Status: Active

Location
- Location: Mandu, Dhar, Madhya Pradesh
- Country: India
- Administration: Archaeological Survey of India; Nagore Dargah Committee
- Coordinates: 22°20′54″N 75°23′51″E

Architecture
- Type: Mosque architecture
- Style: Indo-Islamic; Mughal
- Completed: 1454 CE

Specifications
- Interior area: 7,744 m^{2} (83,360 sq ft)
- Dome: 57; including 3 large
- Materials: Stone; marble

Monument of National Importance
- Official name: Jama Masjid, Mandu

The Jama Masjid, also called Jami Masjid, is an historic Friday mosque in Mandu in the Dhar district of the state of Madhya Pradesh, India. Built in Mughal style, the mosque has been believed to have been built during the reign of Hoshang Shah and completed during the reign of Mahmud Khilji in 1454 CE.

The Masjid has three large domes, a courtyard, 54 smaller domes and colonnade of pillared halls. It has a prayer hall and decorated pillars in the masjid. The entire area of the mosque is 7,725 square metres (83,150 sq ft), built on an elevated platform 4.6 m (15 ft). The inscriptions on the eastern doorway to the porch indicates that the mosque was modeled on the basis of Mosque of Damascus. In modern times, the Group of Monuments at Mandu is maintained and administered by the Bhopal circle of the Archaeological Survey of India.

Mandu is one of the prime tourist destinations of the state of Madhya Pradesh. Along with the other monuments, the average number of visitors a day to the monument stands at 4,000 to 5,000 as of 2020. There are annual shows organized in the monument by the Tourism Department of Madhya Pradesh.

== History ==
When Timur captured Delhi in 1401, the Afghan Dilawar Khan, governor of Malwa, set up his own little kingdom and the Ghuri dynasty was established, His son, Hoshang Shah, shifted the capital from Dhar to Mandu and raised it to its greatest splendour. Mohammed Khalji established the Khalji dynasty of Malwa (1436-1531) and went on to rule for the next 33 years. However, it was under his reign that the Malwa Sultanate reached its greatest height. The mosque is built in Moghul style of architecture and been believed to have been built during the reign of Hoshang Shah and completed during the reign of Mahmud Khilji in 1454. Mahmud Khilji killed his father at the age of 55 and became the king of Mandu. It is believed that he had a harem of 15,000 women and he had a great penchant for art. The western wall contains lovely design and carving measuring 43 centimetres (17 in). In modern times, the Group of Monuments at Mandu is maintained and administered by the Bhopal circle of the Archaeological Survey of India.

== Architecture ==
The fort is one of the finest examples of Afghan architecture in India.

The main entrance of the mosque is through the eastern entrance. The entire area of the mosque is 7,744 square metres (83,360 sq ft), built on an elevated platform 4.6 m (15 ft). The inscriptions on the eastern doorway to the porch indicates that the mosque was modeled on the basis of Mosque of Damascus. The doorway also has marble jambs and lintels which are atypical of Hindu structures. The entry via eastern entrance leads to a large courtyard interspersed with colonnaded verandas on the three sides. The pillared verandas leads to the prayer halls which is covered with pillars with 58 small domes and three large domes. The prayer hall is full of arches. The central mihrab is decorated with verses from Quran. The raised Qibla at the centre has a miniature pulpit made of marble. There are two entrances in the northern wall, one leading to the courtyard and other to the prayer hall.

== In popular culture ==
Mandu is one of the prime tourist destinations of the state of Madhya Pradesh. Along with the other monuments, the average number of visitors a day to the monument stands at 4,000 to 5,000 as of 2020. As per the report from the authorities, the footfall during 2019-20 was 3.79 lakhs and suffered a 50% drop in 2020 due to the COVID-19 global pandemic. During January 2020, a six-day Mandu Festival was held to showcase the various monuments of the city, including the mosque as the major highlight. The Jami Masjid is considered as the most majestic building and prime tourist destinations in the town.

== Gallery ==
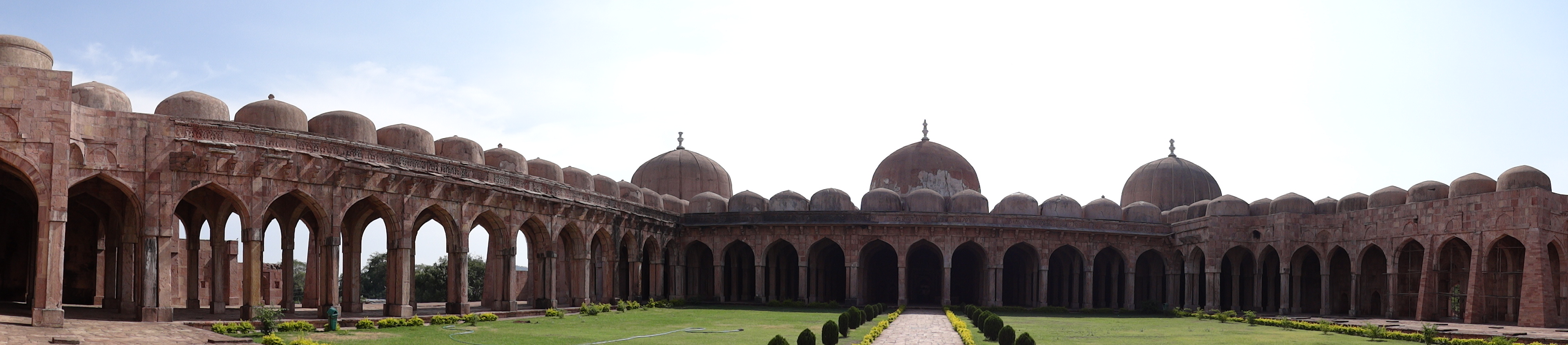
Panorama of the Masjid

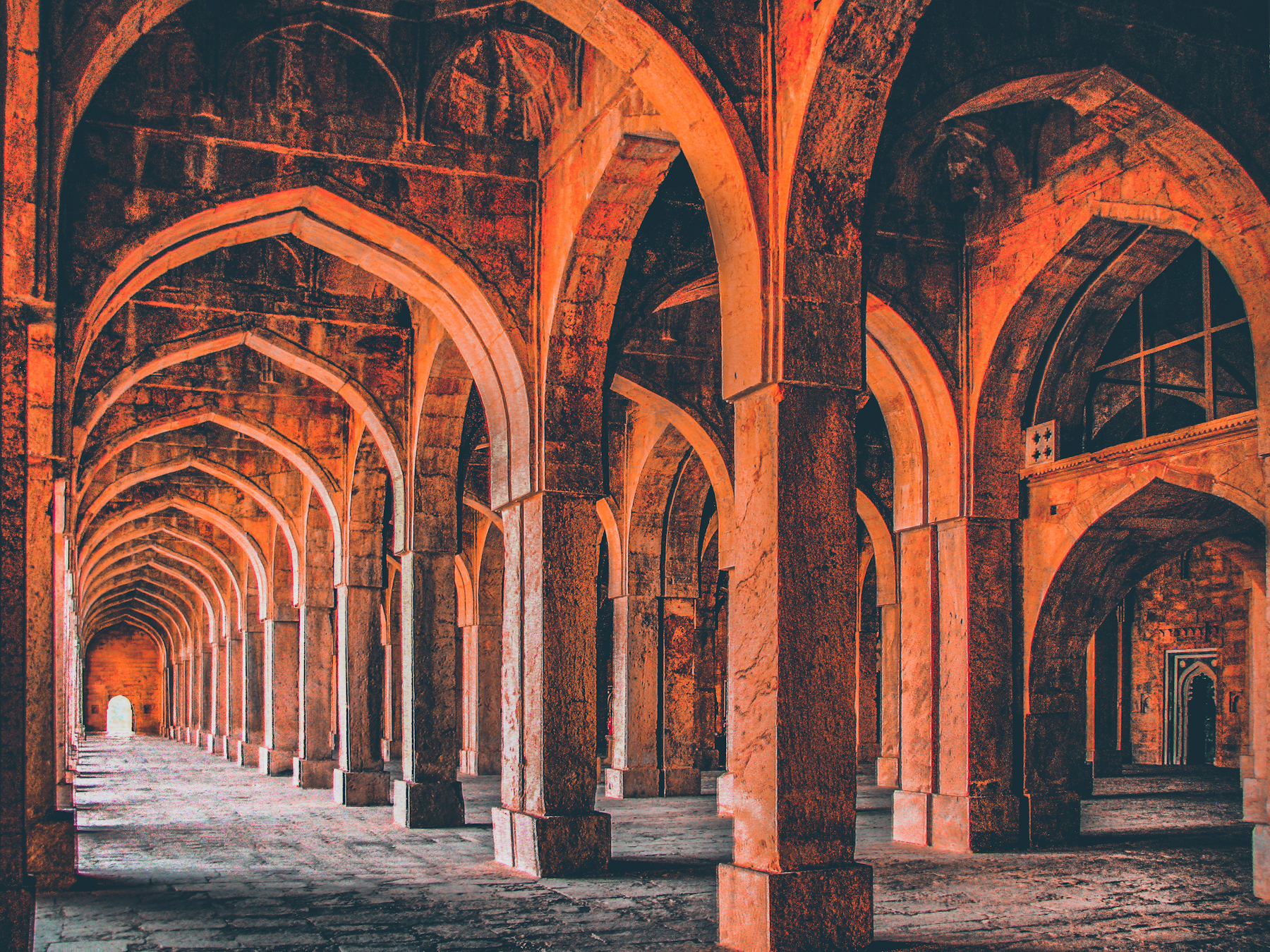
Pillared prayer hall

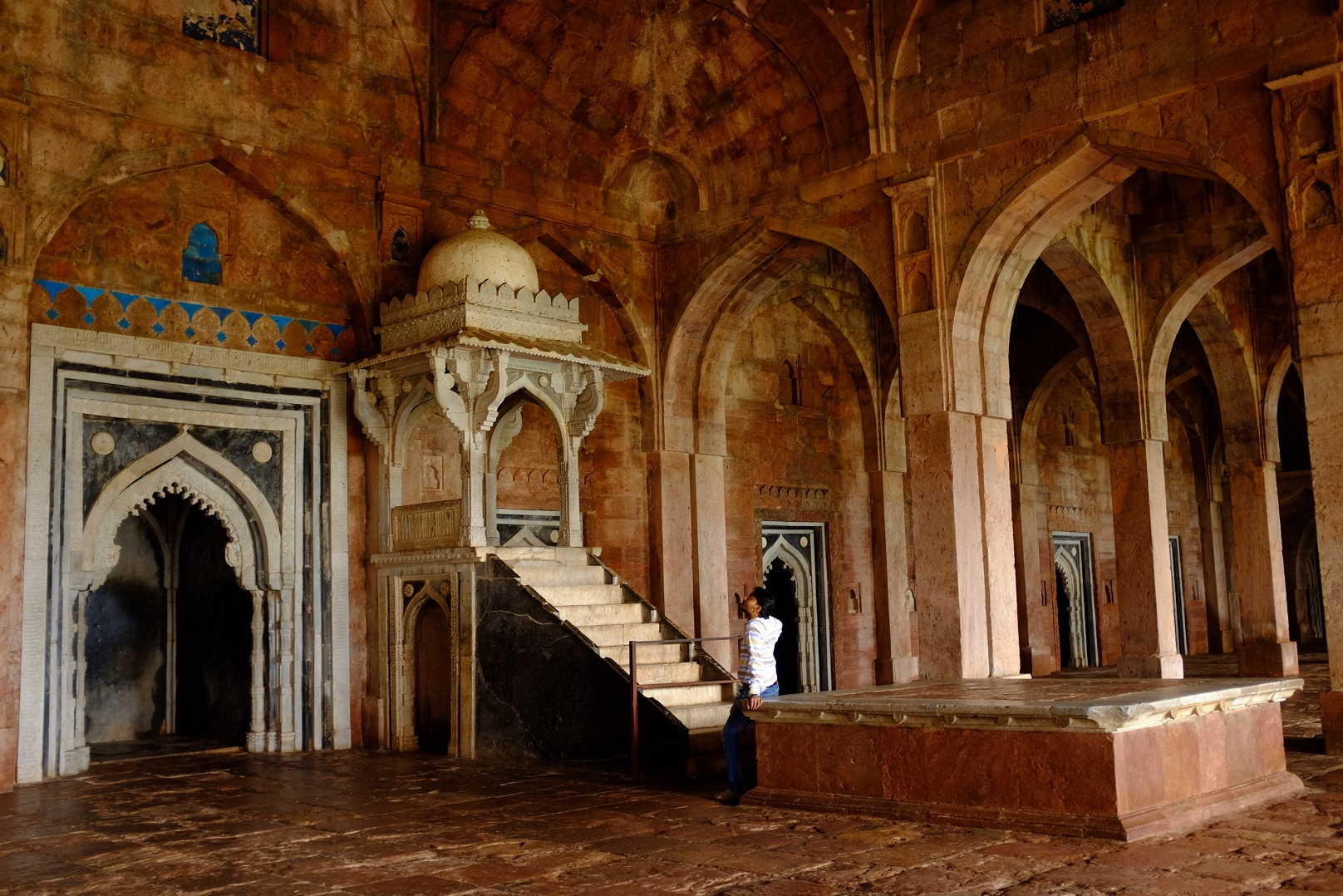
Qibla

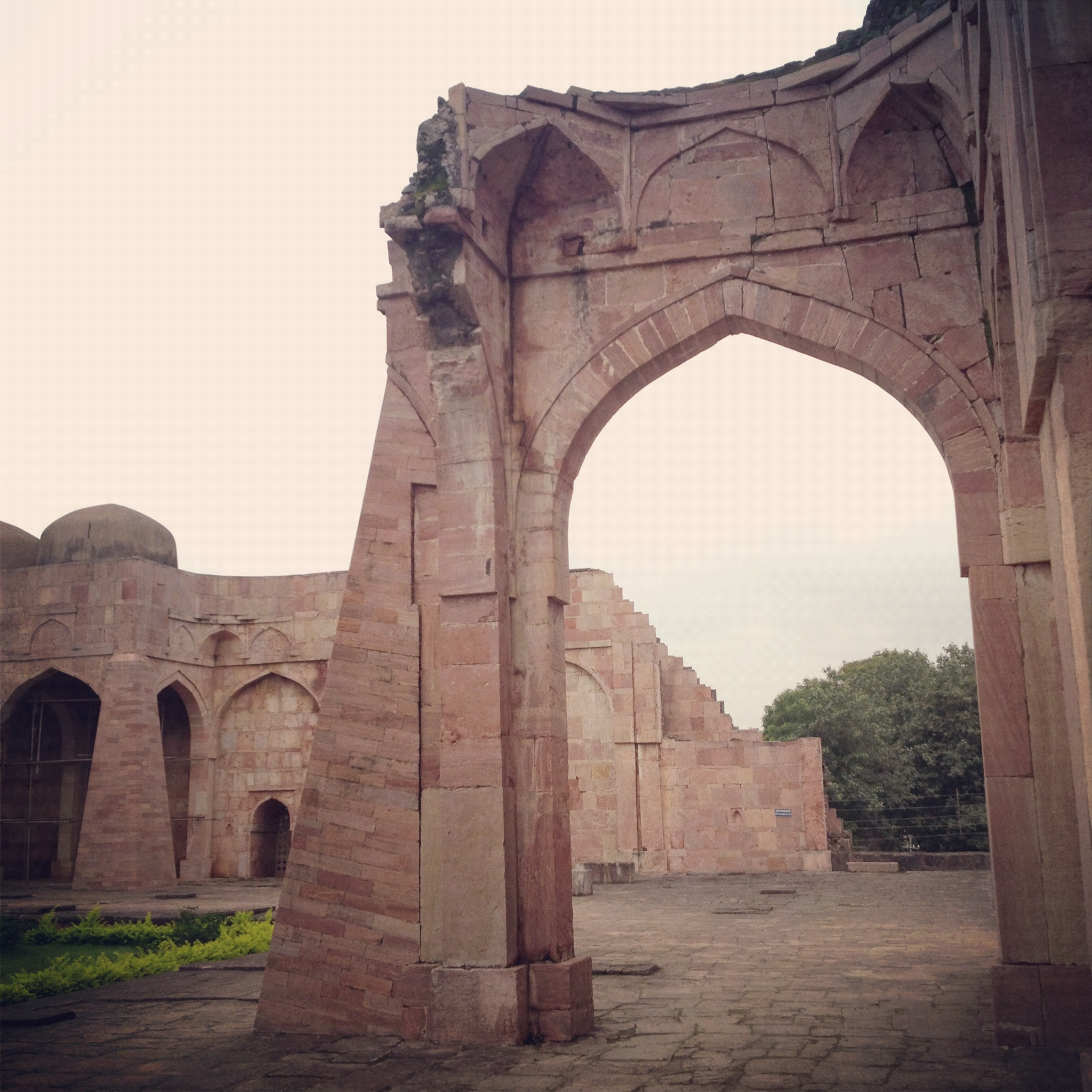
The north east corner, in need of restoration

== See also ==
- Islam in India
- List of mosques in India
- List of Monuments of National Importance in Madhya Pradesh
