= Diogenes of Cyzicus =

Greek metropolitan bishop

Diogenes of Cyzicus (Ancient Greek: Διογένης ἐπίσκοπος Κυζίκου, romanized: Diogenes episkopos Kyzikou) was the metropolitan bishop of the Metropolis of Cyzicus from before 449 to after 451. He participated in the Second Council of Ephesus (449) and the Council of Chalcedon (451), where he opposed the Monophysite doctrine of Eutyches.

He is not to be confused with the 3rd century grammarian Diogenianus or Diogenes of Cyzicus, who wrote the Patria of Cyzicus and is described in the Suda.

== Ephesus II ==
As the bishop of Cyzicus, Diogenes was present at the Second Council of Ephesus in 449. At the council, Eutyches attempted to prove his orthodoxy by reciting the original Nicene Creed of 325, and claiming that Canon 7 of the Council of Ephesus forbids any addition or subtraction from that version of the creed. When records from Ephesus II were reviewed at the Council of Chalcedon, Diogenes objected to this claim, noting that additions were already made to the creed at the First Council of Constantinople to counter the heresy of Apollinarianism. He further accused Eutyches of Apollinarianism for not reciting the 381 version of the Creed, specifically the part that says "of the Holy Spirit and the Virgin Mary". A group of Egyptian bishops protested, apparently unfamiliar with the 381 version and considering it a violation of Canon 7 of Ephesus. The ensuing argument over additions to the Creed is relevant to the later Filioque controversy. It also demonstrates how little-known the 381 version of the Creed was at this time, as Diogenes was "the only bishop at Chalcedon to have shown detailed knowledge of the creed".

In the same complaint, Eutyches anathematized "those who say that the flesh of our Lord and God Jesus Christ came down from heaven". When Eutyches' complaint was reread at the Chalcedon, Eusebius of Dorylaeum pointed out that, while Eutychus correctly denied that Christ's flesh came down from heaven, he did not state from where it came. Diogenes, corroborated by Basil of Seleucia, claimed that they pressed Eutyches at Ephesus, saying "Lord Eutyches, where then did it come from? Tell us" but he didn't comply. (Note: Richard Price and Michael Gaddis question this event, doubting that any of the bishops at Ephesus had the courage or opportunity to publicly challenge Eutyches.) The orthodox answer is that Christ took flesh from the Virgin Mary, but this would contradict Eutyches' belief that Christ is not consubstantial with humanity.

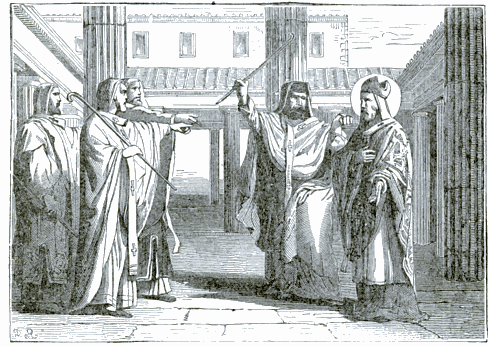
The scene described by Diogenes: Barsauma directing his monks to beat Flavian. Dioscorus is also shown holding a stick

Diogenes also witnessed the violent beating of Flavian at the hands of a certain archimandrite called Barsauma, which led to his death. He later testified that Barsauma's monks beat Flavian as Barsauma stood by and cried "Strike him dead!". The Acts of the Council of Chalcedon record that, when the bishops heard this, they exclaimed "Barsumas is a murderer, cast him out, out with him to the arena, let him be anathema".

Like the other bishops there, Diogenes assented to and signed the proceedings of the Second Council of Ephesus, namely the restoration of Eutyches to his position as archimandrite and the deposition of Flavian and Eusebius. However, some of these bishops later withrew their assents, accusing Dioscorus of threatening them with a mob, forcing them to sign a blank paper, and having his notaries forge statements from them.

== Chalcedon ==
Two years later, Diogenes also participated in the Council of Chalcedon. The council began with a reading of the acts of the 448 Home Synod in Constantinople and the Second Council of Ephesus, which Diogenes and the other bishops made several comments on.

Like the other bishops at Chalcedon, he assented to the deposition of Dioscorus and signed the Tome of Leo. When a group of 13 Egyptian bishops wrote a statement of faith to the council, affirming their belief in the ecumenical councils and rejection of heresy without explicitly mentioning Eutyches, Diogenes demanded they anathematize Eutyches and sign Leo's Tome, noting that the council was about Eutyches. They requested to hear Dioscorus' opinion first, arguing that Canon 6 of Nicaea (Note: "Let the ancient customs prevail, those in Egypt, Libya and Pentapolis, with the effect that the bishop in Alexandria has authority over all these [places]." The 13 Egyptian bishops interpreted this canon to mean "that the whole Egyptian diocese should follow the archbishop of the great city of Alexandria and that nothing should be done without him by any of the bishops under him." These bishops were Hieracis of Aphnaeum, Sabinus of Coptitae (either Adulis or Buto), Apollonius of Tanis, Pasmius of Paralus, Januarius of Leontopolis, Eulogius of Athribis, John of Psinchaus, Isaac of Taua, Hero of Thennesus, Stephen of Gerae, Theophilus of Erythrum, Theophilus of Cleopatris, and Isidore of Sethroites (Heracleopolis Parva).) forbids them from making a decision without him, to which Diogenes mocked them saying "How can someone who has no idea what he believes elect a bishop?"

This was not Diogenes' only use of derisive snark. In discussing the wrongdoings of rival provincial Bishops Bassianus and Stephen of Ephesus, Eusebius of Dorylaeum noted that their consecrations were contrary to the canons. In response, Diogenes joked that in the provinces "they consecrate pickle-sellers" (Note: Meaning that they ordain absolutely anyone) and remarked that the bishops should have been appointed by Constantinople instead. Bishop Leontius of Magnesia and several other bishops understandably expressed offence, pointing to Canon 4 of Nicaea. (Note: "A bishop should be appointed by all the bishops in the province") When it was suggested that both Bassianus and Stephen be retired with a pension and a new bishop appointed for Ephesus, Diogenes replied to the general positive chant of "This is a pious proposal. This is according to the canons" with the less enthusiastic "It is better than the others."

Throughout the council, Diogenes played the part of "a zealous upholder of the privileges of New Rome". He resisted what he saw as attempts by the See of Alexandria to usurp the position of Constantinople and Rome. In Ephesus, Flavian (the Patriarch of Constantinople) was listed after the other four patriarchs, but at Chalcedon Anatolius (the Patriarch who succeeded Flavian) was listed first. When Paschasinus of Lilybaeum proudly observed this, Diogenes dryly commented "Because you know the canons", referring to Canon III of Constantinople. (Note: "The Bishop of Constantinople should have the prerogative of honor after the Bishop of Rome because Constantinople is New Rome")

Like the other bishops at the council, Diogenes approved and signed in every session he attended. He signed the last session on behalf of both himself and Cyzicus' suffragan bishops: Timothy of Germe, Alexander of Oce, Philostorgius of Scepsis, Gemellus of Miletopolis, Eutychianus of Baris, and Acacius of Proconnesus.
