= Basil of Seleucia =

5th century Roman bishop and ecclesiastical writer

Basil of Seleucia was a Roman Bishop and ecclesiastical writer. He was archbishop of Seleucia ad Calycadnum by 448. He condemned Eutyches in the year 448, "acquiesced" while "rehabilitating" at the Latrocinium in 449, "but recanted and signed" the Tome of Leo in 450.

== Biography ==
His date of birth is uncertain but probably around the turn of the 5th century; he was consecrated bishop by 448, a position he held for at least a decade. Basil was a notable figure during the period when the Eastern Church was convulsed by the Eutychian controversy, and was necessarily obliged to take sides in all the attendant disputes. Those of his writings which have come down to us, though perhaps too rhetorical and involved, suggest that he was a man of great literary ability.

He was appointed Bishop of Seleucia in Isauria, between the years 432 and 447, and was one of those who took part in the Synod of Constantinople, which was summoned in 448 by Patriarch Flavian of Constantinople to assess the faith of the archimandrite Eutyches. Although in Constantinople he accepted Eutyches' condemnation, he attended the Second Council of Ephesus the next year (449), where he voted for the rehabilitation of Eutyches and for the deposition of the Patriarch of Constantinople. Later, at Chalcedon, he claimed that he had felt obliged to submit to the authority of the other bishops at Ephesus, particularly Dioscurus of Alexandria.

Like many who had submitted to Dioscurus at Ephesus, he went on to accept the condemnation of both Eutyches and Dioscurus at Chalcedon. Throughout the turmoil, however, his personal confession remained consistent: the one Christ is fully human and fully divine, and either 'one nature' or 'two nature' language is orthodox if rightly understood. He is particularly notable for originating the qualified Dyophysite formula promulgated in the Chalcedonian definition: 'made known in two natures'. After Chalcedon, he seems to have continued a zealous opponent of the Miaphysite party, and in the year 458 he joined with his fellow-bishops of Isauria, in an appeal to the Emperor Leo I, requesting him to use his influence in forwarding the Decrees of Chalcedon, and in securing the deposition of Timotheus Aelurus, who had intruded himself in 457 into the Patriarchate of Alexandria. This is the last reference we find to Basil and it is commonly supposed that he died shortly afterwards, probably between 458 and 460, although Oxford cites his death at after 468.

== Theology ==
Basil was a staunch anti-Nestorian, stressing the real union of the two natures of the incarnate Logos whereby "God the Word was incarnate of the Virgin."

=== Mariology ===
In the well-known homily On the Annunciation now generally recognised as authentic (for discussion of which, see 'Writings' below), Basil bears witness to a highly developed Marian theology. Written in the highly-charged theological climate after the Council of Ephesus, the homiletic hymn is of a devotional nature, bearing witness to the blossoming of Mariologial thought. True to form with his Christological convictions, he affirms the divine maternity and title of Theotokos, intertwined with the mystery of the incarnation. O'Carroll notes that "he cannot praise the Theotokos fittingly", declaring that she is the temple truly worthy of God, and "shines above all the martyrs as the sun outshines the stars", language consistent with earlier contemporaries like Proclus and Cyril. Likewise, Basil makes use of salutatory invocations beginning with Χαῖρε ("Hail") which would become a mainstay of Marian devotion in subsequent centuries.

O'Carroll additionally observes that Basil "marks an advance" over previous theologians in his teachings on Marian intercession, wherein the bishop sets forth a clear understanding of the Virgin's mediatorial capacity, and strongly links it with her divine motherhood. In so doing, he applies Christo-centric theological language to the Virgin in a secondary manner. Basil acclaims her "set as Mediatress of God and men that the dividing element of hatred might be taken away and heavenly and earthly [things] be made one." This helped standardise language and concepts for the medieval Marian doctrine of intercession grounded in her role as Mother of God. Her mediatorial role in Basil's theology, Reynolds says, is intrinsically linked to the incarnation and is not explicitly said to involve ongoing mediation. At the same time, his direct invocation of the Theotokos with royal appellations and a plethora of praises of her exalted status suggests a developing understanding of such a capacity on the Virgin's part. Reynolds identifies him as the first person known to have used the term Mediatrix, a short while before Antipater of Bostra. For Basil, Mary is the one "through whom the angels are rightly glorified," the one "[through whom] the rule of death is destroyed", among many other appellations. Limberis observes that Basil's hymnic oration "reflect[s] the growth of the cult of the Theotokos, sanctioned by the bishops, incorporated into the liturgical cycle of the year."

== Writings ==
Forty-one sermons (logoi) on different portions of the Old Testament have come down to us under his name, and are found in Migne, where is also his history of the protomartyr Thecla and of the miracles wrought at her grave. Most of these sermons may be regarded as genuine, though some of them are now generally assigned to Nestorius.

Perhaps the most significant of the works ascribed to Basil is Homily XXXIX On the Annunciation of the most holy Mother of God. B Marx argued against its authenticity, instead assigning it to Proclus of Constantinople. Cunningham agrees that it is spurious but rejects this association in favour of anonymity, dating it to the early 6th century. Nevertheless, in his extensive assessment of the arguments, R Caro accepts the work as authentic and O'Carroll assigns its precise provenance to Constantinople in 449. Likewise, Tevel affirms its authenticity. Peltomaa is unconvinced of any attribution but agrees with a date preceding the Council of Chalcedon, and uses the text in her argument for a 5th century dating of the Akathist hymn; she cites the work of de Matons who argued that the hymn was dependent both on Romanos the Melodist and his sources, including Basil. Cunningham concedes that the majority of scholars are in agreement on a mid-5th century date.

According to Photius, Basil also dealt in verse with the life and miracles of Saint Thecla. This, however, was a poem and is not the same as the prose Life and Miracles of Saint Thecla. on the basis of the lack of theological content to indicate a late date,
