= Ibas of Edessa =

Syrian bishop (fl. c. 435 – 457)

Ibas
- Title: Bishop

Personal life
- Born: Syria
- Died: 28 October 457 Parthia

Religious life
- Religion: Christianity

Senior posting
- Predecessor: Rabbula
- Successor: Nonnus of Edessa

Ibas of Edessa (Classical Syriac: ܗܝܒܐ ܐܘܪܗܝܐ, Ihiba or Hiba; d. 28 October 457) was bishop of Edessa (c. 435 – 457) and was born in Syria. His name is the Syriac equivalent of "Donatus". He is frequently associated with the growth of Nestorianism, although this assertion is contentious and has been opposed.

== Biography ==
=== Presbyter at Edessa ===
He appears first as a presbyter of the church of Edessa during the episcopate of Rabbula, warmly espousing the theological views which his bishop uncompromisingly opposed. He admired the writings of Theodore of Mopsuestia, which he translated into Syriac and diligently disseminated through the East.

The famous theological school of Edessa, of which, according to some accounts, Ibas was head, and to which the Christian youth from Persia and adjacent lands came for education, offered many opportunities for propagating Theodore's beliefs. The growing popularity of doctrines which appeared clearly heretical alarmed Rabbula, and he endeavored to get Theodore's works anathematized and burnt. However, the church of Edessa was generally favorable to Theodore's teaching and supported Ibas against their bishop.

Ibas attended the Council of Ephesus in 431 as a presbyter, was cognizant of the autocratic conduct of Cyril of Alexandria, and wrote in 433 the letter to a man that became known as "Maris, bishop of Hardaschir (or Adashir) in Persia", a letter which later became one of the Three Chapters. He was probably Mari who was metropolitan of Rev Ardashir around 450. The name might well be a misunderstood appellation formula for the bishop of Seleucia-Ctesiphon, a city known as Adashir during the Sassanid period, which at that point was a certain Catholicos Dadisho (421–456), head of the Church of the East in the Sassanid Empire. "Maris" had been at Edessa previous to the Nestorian controversy, and Ibas wrote to tell him what had occurred since his visit. Though evidently written under great exasperation, it shows Ibas as a man of independent judgment, and free from partisanship. In the letter, Nestorius is severely censured for refusing the title Theotokos to the Virgin Mary, and Ibas accuses Cyril of Apollinarism, and denounces the heresy of his 12 chapters, charging him with maintaining the perfect identity of the manhood and Godhead in Christ, and denying the Catholic doctrine of the union of two Natures in One Person.

=== Election as bishop and accusations ===
When Rabbula died in 435 or 436, Ibas was elected his successor. This was distasteful to those who held the strong anti-Nestorian views of their late bishop, and they speedily planned to secure his deposition, by spreading charges against him of openly preaching heretical doctrines. The accusations soon reached the ears of Emperor Theodosius II and Archbishop Proclus of Constantinople. To Proclus the matter appeared so serious that towards the close of 437, he wrote to John I of Antioch as the leading prelate of the East, begging him to persuade Ibas, if innocent, to remove the scandal by condemning publicly certain propositions chiefly drawn from Theodore's writings against the errors of Nestorius. The same demand was made by Proclus of all the Eastern bishops; but Ibas and the other bishops generally refused to condemn Theodore's propositions.

Although blocked so far, the malcontents at Edessa continued to work against their bishop. Their leaders were four presbyters, Samuel, Cyrus, Eulogius and Maras, who acted at the instigation of one of Ibas's own suffragans, Uranius, bishop of Himeria, a pronounced Eutychian. While Patriarch Domnus II of Antioch, who had in 442 succeeded his uncle John I of Antioch as Patriarch of Antioch, visited Hierapolis Bambyce for the enthronisation of the new bishop Stephen, Ibas's opponents chose that moment for action. Cyrus and Eulogius formally laid before Domnus the accusation against Ibas, signed by about 17 clergy of Edessa, and supported by 30. Ibas, starting his journey for Hierapolis Bambyce to pay his respects to Domnus, learned of the accusation, at once summoned his clergy, pronounced excommunication on Cyrus and Eulogius as calumniators, and threatened the same treatment to all who participated in their proceedings.

=== Trials at Antioch and Beirut ===
In 445, Ibas was summoned by Domnus to the synod held at Antioch in the matter of Athanasius of Perrha, but he excused himself by letter. Domnus supported Ibas, and he showed no readiness to entertain the charges brought against him. At last, in Lent 448, the four chief accusers presented their indictment before Domnus and the council of the East in a manner too formal to be neglected. Domnus consequently summoned Ibas to appear before him after Easter to answer the charges. The council was held at Antioch, and was attended by only nine bishops. Ibas in person answered the 18 charges, mostly of a frivolous character and destitute of proof, e.g. that he had appropriated a jewelled chalice to his own use; that the wine at the Eucharist was inferior in quality and quantity; the malversation of sums given for the ransom of captives; simoniacal ordinations and the admission of unfit persons to the ministry and episcopate, especially his nephew Daniel, whom he had made bishop of Harran. The most serious charges were that he had anathematised Cyril and charged him with heresy; that he was a Nestorian; and especially that at Easter 445, in the presence of his clergy, he had spoken the blasphemous words, "I do not envy Christ His becoming God, for I can become God no less than He" and "This is the day that Jesus Christ became God". The first charge he acknowledged, the others he indignantly repudiated as base slanders. Only two of the accusers appeared. Samuel and Cyrus had gone to Constantinople, in defiance of the terms on which the excommunication had been lifted, to lay their complaint before the emperor and the Patriarch of Constantinople, deciding that a hearing by Domnus would obviously be biased towards Ibas. Domnus and the council declined to proceed in the absence of the chief witnesses, and the case seemed to be postponed indefinitely.

Eulogius and Maras then hastened to join their companions in Constantinople, where they found a powerful party strongly hostile to the Eastern bishops, Theodoret in particular. Their faction was soon strengthened by the arrival of Uranius of Himeria, and half a dozen more Edessene clergy. The emperor and Archbishop Flavian of Constantinople, who had succeeded Proclus as archbishop, listened to their complaints but declined to hear them officially. The case was remitted to the East, and by an imperial commission, dated 26 October 448, Uranius of Himeria, Eustathius of Beirut and Photius of Tyre, who was elected 9 September 448, on the deposition of Irenaeus of Tyre, were deputed to hear it, and Damascius, the tribune and secretary of state, was dispatched as imperial commissioner. The whole proceeding was contrary to the canons that bishops should be subjected to the judgment of other bishops, two belonging to another province, on the strength of an imperial decree. No one, however, protested imperial power was regarded as absolute. The tribunal also was grossly unfair. One of the three judges, Uranius of Himeria, was ringleader of the movement against Ibas, while the other two had obtained their sees with his help.

Tyre was named as the place of trial but the hearing was moved to the episcopal residence in Beirut to avoid disturbances. In response to the indictment, Ibas laid before his judges a memorial signed by many of his clergy, denying that he had ever uttered the alleged blasphemies. Only three witnesses supported the accusation and brought forward a copy of the controversial letter to "Maris". It was later alleged by Ibas's enemies during the Second Council of Ephesus and the Council of Chalcedon that Ibas admitted to writing the Letter to Maris and that the minutes of the Council of Beirut were not forged. Justinian I's assertion that Ibas had disowned the letter to Maris at Beirut, as having been forged in his name, is disputed by Facundus of Hermiane. Allegations of forgeries of the Council of Beirut's minutes lay bare that Ibas either did admit he wrote the letter and then reneged by having partisans falsify the aforementioned minutes or that he denied writing the letter, forcing his accusers to falsify the said minutes in the same section.

In any event, the commissioners, avoiding any judicial decision, brought about a friendly arrangement. His enemies agreed to withdraw their accusations on Ibas's promising that he would forget the past, regard his accusers as his children, and remit any fresh difficulty for settlement to Domnus; and that, to avoid suspicion of malversation, the church revenues of Edessa should be administered, like those of Antioch, by oeconomi. Ibas gave equal satisfaction on theological points. He engaged to publicly anathematise Nestorius and all who thought with him on his return, and declared the identity of his doctrine with that agreed upon by John and Cyril, and that he accepted the decrees of Ephesus equally with those of Nicaea as due to the inspiration of the Holy Spirit. The concordat was signed, Uranius alone dissenting, 25 February 449.

=== Deposition at Ephesus ===
The truce was broken within a very few weeks. The Eutychian party was aided by the intrigues of Chrysaphius, Dioscorus of Alexandria and their partisans to obtain an edict summoning a further General Second Council of Ephesus for 1 August 449. Although the council was intended to rehabilitate the reputation of Eutyches, it served as a weapon against Ibas as well. Reports diligently spread in Edessa during his absence of Ibas's heterodoxy made his reception so hostile that he was obliged to leave the town and request the Magister militum for a guard to protect him. He soon discovered that all appeal to the civil power was in vain. Chaereas was governor of Osrhoene but had secret instructions from Chrysaphius and Eutyches to arrest and imprison him and reopen the suit. When Chaereas entered Edessa on 12 April 449, to commence the trial, he was met by a mob of abbots and monks and their partisans, clamoring for the immediate expulsion and condemnation of Ibas and his followers. Two days later the inquiry began with Ibas absent and a mob agitating for his condemnation. All Edessa knew that Chaereas had come merely to announce a sentence of condemnation already passed.

Chaereas, however, was moving too slowly for their hatred, and on Sunday, 17 April, the excitement in church was so violent that the count was compelled to promise that the verdict of the synod of Beirut should be reviewed and a new investigation commenced. This began on the next day; all the old charges were reproduced by the same accusers, amid wild yells of "Ibas to the gallows, to the mines, to the circus, to exile" drowning every attempt at explanation or defence. Crucial in the workings of the crowd were monks from monasteries in the city and its vicinity. Chaereas, as had been predetermined, addressed a report to the imperial government, declaring the charges proved; and on 27 June the emperor, acknowledging the receipt of the document, ordered that a bishop who would command the confidence of the faithful should be substituted for Ibas. Only a legally constituted synod could depose him, but meanwhile his enemies' malice could be gratified by his maltreatment. He was forbidden to enter Edessa, apprehended and treated as the vilest of criminals, dragged about from province to province, changing his quarters 40 times and being in 20 different prisons.

The Second Council of Ephesus opened on 3 August 449. One of its objects was to finally get rid of Ibas, which was the work of the second session, held on 22 August. The three bishops who had conducted the investigation at Tyre and Beirut were asked for an account of their proceedings; they avoided reporting Ibas's acquittal, stating that the investigation that was later made at Edessa would be more useful. The monks of Edessa and the other parties to the indictment were admitted and asked for their report, which condemned Ibas as expected. The motion of deposition carried without objection, Eustathius of Beirut and Photius of Tyre, who had previously acquitted him on the same evidence, voting with the majority. Ibas was not called to appear, being then in prison at Antioch. It is not clear what befell Ibas on his deposition.

=== Reinstatement at Chalcedon ===
At the beginning of 451 the bishops who were deposed and banished as a consequence of the Second Council of Ephesus were allowed to return from exile, but the question of their restoration was left for the Council of Chalcedon. At the 9th session, 26 October, the case of Ibas came before the assembled bishops. On his demand to be restored in accordance with the verdict of Photius of Tyre and Eustathius of Beirut, the Acts of that synod (as well as a previous synod in Tyre) were read, and the next day the papal legates gave their opinion that Ibas, was unlawfully deposed, and should be at once restored. After much discussion this was carried unanimously. The legates led the way, declaring "his letter" to be orthodox, and commanded his restitution. All the prelates agreed in this verdict, on the condition that he should anathematize Nestorius and Eutyches and accept the tome of Leo. Ibas consented without hesitation. "He had anathematised Nestorius already in his writings, and would do so again ten thousand times, together with Eutyches and all who teach the One Nature, and would accept all that the council holds as truth". On this he was unanimously absolved, restored as bishop of Edessa at the subsequent sessions. Nonnus of Edessa, who had been chosen bishop on Ibas's deposition, having been legitimately ordained, was allowed to retain his episcopal rank, and on Ibas's death, 28 October 457, quietly succeeded him as metropolitan. The acceptance of "his letter", the Council not being specific which letter was being referred to, would lead to later controversy and allegations that the Council of Chalcedon had approved of the contents of the Letter to Maris.

=== Church builder ===
According to the Chronicle of Edessa, Ibas erected the new church of the Apostles at Edessa, to which a senator gave a silver table of 720 lb. weight, and consul Anatolius, Magister militum, a silver coffer to receive the relics of Thomas the Apostle, who was said, after preaching in Parthia, to have been buried there.

== Later controversy ==
A controversy concerning Ibas' letter to "Maris" arose in the next century, in the notorious dispute about the "Three Chapters", when the letter was branded as heretical (together with the works of Theodore of Mopsuestia and Theodoret's writings in favour of Nestorius) in the edict of Justinian, and was formally condemned in 553 by the fifth general council, which pronounced an anathema against all who should pretend that it and the other documents impugned had been recognized as orthodox by the Council of Chalcedon. Later, the Syriac Orthodox Church anathematised Ibas as a Nestorian.

== Notes and references ==
Attribution

== Bibliography ==
- Meyendorff, John (1989). Imperial unity and Christian divisions - The Church 450–680 AD. The Church in history. Vol. 2. Crestwood, NY: Saint Vladimir's Seminary Press. ISBN 978-0-88-141056-3.
- Claudia Rammelt, Ibas von Edessa, Rekonstruktion einer Biographie und dogmatischen Position zwischen den Fronten, De Gruyter, 2008.
