= Barsauma (died 456) =

Syriac saint monk

Saint Barsauma

The Father of the Syrian Monks
- Died: 456
- Venerated in: Oriental Orthodox Church; Coptic Orthodox Church
- Feast: 3rd of February

St. Barsauma (died 456) was a Syriac-speaking monk and holy man, a leading opponent of the Council of Chalcedon of 451. He is the subject of a biography in Syriac composed about a century after his death. He is regarded as a saint by the Oriental Orthodox. He is the subject of the Life of Barsauma, which was recently translated. Jacob of Serugh also composed a homily about Barsauma.

== Hagiography ==
St Barsauma was a disciple of St Abraham of the High Mountain. Barsauma was responsible for the destruction of numerous temples and synagogues, both Jewish and Samaritan, between 418 and 423 (alternatively 419–422). According to ancient sources, when he visited the synagogue of Rabba (Areopolis), its doors miraculously opened, and the synagogue was set on fire. Looting was forbidden by Barsauma's order, and the synagogue burned to the ground. It is unclear if local Jews had converted to Christianity.

In 438, Barsauma and forty of his followers attacked Jews praying at the ruins of the Temple in Jerusalem, killing many. He was tried, but claimed innocence, saying the stones were cast from heaven, and eventually acquitted.

=== Martyrdom of Flavian ===
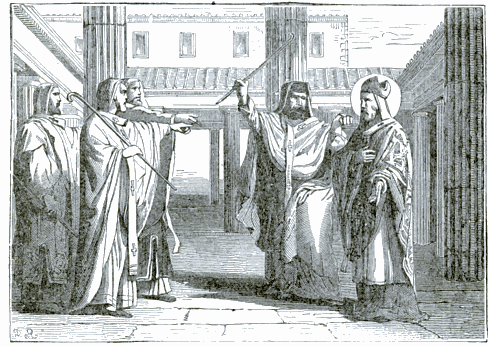
Barsauma and Pope Dioscorus I of Alexandria depicted killing Flavian of Constantinople

During the Council of Chalcedon in 451, Bishop Diogenes of Cyzicus claimed to have witnessed Barsauma killing Patriarch Flavian of Constantinople at the 449 Second Council of Ephesus. According to Diogenes, a group of Barsauma's monks assaulted Flavian while Barsauma stood by and cried "Strike him dead!". Flavian died of his injuries three days later. The Acts of the Council of Chalcedon record that, when the bishops heard Diogenes' testimony, they exclaimed "Barsauma is a murderer, cast him out, out with him to the arena, let him be anathema".

== Veneration ==
He is commemorated in the Syriac Orthodox Church on the 3rd of February and in the Coptic Orthodox Church on the 9th of Amshir.

== Sources ==
- Akhrass, Roger (2015). "A list of Homilies of Mor Jacob of Serugh". Syriac Patriarchal Orthodox Journal. 53: 87–161.
- Brock, Sebastian P (2021). "Review of Palmer 2020". The Journal of Theological Studies. 72 (2): 1007–1009. doi:10.1093/jts/flab128.
- Fiey, Jean Maurice (2004). Saints syriaques. Darwin Press.
- Palmer, Andrew N., ed. (2020). The Life of the Syrian Saint Barsauma: Eulogy of a Hero of the Resistance to the Council of Chalcedon. Transformation of the Classical Heritage. Vol. 61. University of California Press. doi:10.1525/9780520972988. ISBN 978-0-520-97298-8.
- Van Rompay, Lucas (2018). "Barṣawmo". In Sebastian P. Brock; Aaron M. Butts; George A. Kiraz; Lucas Van Rompay (eds.). Gorgias Encyclopedic Dictionary of the Syriac Heritage: Electronic Edition. Beth Mardutho. Originally printed by Gorgias Press, 2011.
