= Baris in Hellesponto =

Ancient city and bishopric in Asia Minor

Coordinates: 40°06′08″N 27°39′19″E

Baris (Ancient Greek: Βάρις), called Baris in Hellesponto to distinguish it from other places called Baris, was an ancient city and bishopric in Asia Minor, which remains a Catholic titular see.

== History ==
Baris was located in the Troas part of Mysia, in the area of the modern Sarïköy and Biga in Anatolia. It was important enough in the Late Roman Province of Hellespont(us) to be a suffragan see of its capital Cyzicus's Metropolitan Archbishopric, in the sway of the Patriarchate of Constantinople, but, like many cities, declined during Late Antiquity.

Its site is located near Gönen in Asiatic Turkey.

=== Residential Ordinaries ===
Two of its incumbent Bishops are recorded for certain:

- Eutichianus, in whose name Metropolitan Diogenes of Cyzicus signed at the Council of Chalcedon (451)
- Domninus, who in 458 signed the letter of the bishops of the Hellespont province to Byzantine Emperor Leo I the Thracian after the lynching by Coptic mobs of Patriarch Proterius of Alexandria.

Two other Bishops of Baris, Paulus and Stefanus, signing at councils in 869 and 879, might be from this see or its namesake Baris in Pisidia.

== Titular see ==
The diocese was nominally restored (no later than 1738 and again in 1933) as the Titular bishopric (held by an ordained, non-diocesan bishop who usually serves in another capacity as well) of Baris in Hellesponto (Latin). The diocese is known as Baris di Ellesponto in Curiate Italian.

The bishopric has been vacant for a number of decades, but was previously held by at least three incumbents of the fitting Episcopal (lowest) rank, whose simultaneous assignment is listed as well:

- Louis Marie Maggi (陸迪仁), Dominican Order O.P. (October 8, 1738 – death August 20, 1743), first as Coadjutor Apostolic Vicar of Szechwan 四川 (imperial China) (October 8, 1738 – December 17, 1742), then succeeding as Apostolic Vicar of Szechwan 四川 (December 17, 1742 – August 20, 1743)
- Jerome Aloysius Daugherty Sebastian as Auxiliary Bishop of Baltimore (Maryland, USA) (December 22, 1953 – death October 11, 1960)
- Walenty Wójcik (pl) as Auxiliary Bishop of Sandomierz–Radom (Poland) (October 26, 1960 – November 22, 1990).

== Sources and external links ==
- GCatholic - data for all sections

Bibliography

- Mansi, Sacrorum conciliorum nova et amplissima collectio, vol. VII, col. 163.
