= Life and Miracles of Saint Thecla =

Greek hagiography

The Life and Miracles of Saint Thecla (Latin: De vita et miraculis sanctae Theclae) is a Greek hagiography of Thecla, the reputed follower of Paul of Tarsus. The text was composed between 445 and 474.

It consists of two books, the first a biography and the second an account of 46 posthumous miracles wrought by Thecla. The Life is an expansion of the earlier Greek Acts of Thecla. The full Life and Miracles is about ten times longer than the Acts.

The Life circulated independently of the Miracles, but the Miracles was always transmitted with the Life. There are a total of twelve manuscripts of the Life, but only four of those include the Miracles. The manuscripts that include the Miracles are:

- Vaticanus gr. 1667 (10th century), which is lacunose
- Mosquensis synod 26 (11th century)
- Atheniensis 2095 (12th century), which is in the best condition
- Vaticanus gr. 1853 (10th century), a palimpsest with only fragments of the Life and Miracles

"The Miracles give some vivid slices of life in and around the shrine of Hagia Thekla in the last third of the fifth century."

The Life and Miracles is an anonymous work written in Seleucia. In the Middle Ages, it was usually attributed to Bishop Basil of Seleucia, a contemporary of the actual author. This may have been based on the remark by Photios in the 9th century that Basil wrote an verse account of the deeds of Thecla. As the Life and Miracles is prose, it cannot be the work mentioned. In fact, the author remarks that Basil excommunicated him for a time. Nevertheless, he is still often known as Pseudo-Basil of Seleucia.

== Bibliography ==
=== Editions ===
- Dagron, G., ed. (1978). Vie et miracles de Sainte Thècle: Texte grec, traduction et commentaire. Subsidia Hagiographica, 62. Brussels: Société des Bollandistes.
- Honey, Linda (2011). Thekla: Text and Context with a First English Translation of the Miracles (PDF) (Doctoral dissertation). University of Calgary.
- Johnson, Scott Fitzgerald (2006). The Life and Miracles of Thekla: A Literary Study. Center for Hellenic Studies.

=== Secondary literature ===
- Honey, Linda (2017). "Religious Profiling in the Miracles of Saint Thecla". In Marianne Sághy; Edward M. Schoolman (eds.). Pagans and Christians in the Late Roman Empire: New Evidence, New Approaches (4th–8th centuries). Central European University Press. pp. 27–42.
- Hylen, Susan (2015). A Modest Apostle: Thecla and the History of Women in the Early Church. Oxford University Press.
- Johnson, Scott Fitzgerald (2006). "Late Antique Narrative Fiction: Apocryphal Acta and the Greek Novel in the Fifth-Century Life and Miracles of Thekla". In Scott Fitzgerald Johnson (ed.). Greek Literature in Late Antiquity: Dynamism, Didacticism, Classicism. Ashgate. pp. 189–207.
- Pesthy, Monika (1996). "Thecla in the Fathers of the Church". In Jan N. Bremmer (ed.). The Apocryphal Acts of Paul and Thecla. Kok Pharos. pp. 164–178.
- Streete, Gail Corrington (2009). Redeemed Bodies: Women Martyrs in Early Christianity. Westminster John Knox Press.
- Tzamalikos, Panayiotis (2012). A Newly Discovered Greek Father: Cassian the Sabaite Eclipsed by John Cassian of Marseilles. Brill.
