= Flavian of Constantinople =

Archbishop of Constantinople from 446 to 449

Saint Flavian of Constantinople
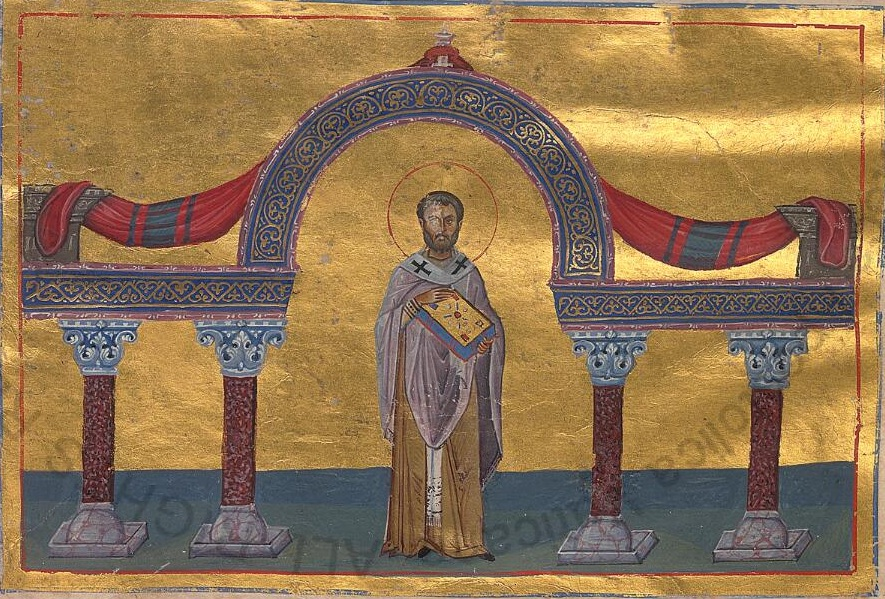
- Saint Flavian, as depicted in the 11th century, Menologion of Basil II

Patriarch of Constantinople
- Died: 11 August 449; Hypaepa, Lydia, Asia Minor
- Venerated in: Eastern Orthodox Church; Roman Catholic Church; Lutheran Church
- Canonized: 451 by Council of Chalcedon
- Major shrine: Relics venerated in Italy
- Feast: 18 February

Flavian (Latin: Flavianus; Ancient Greek: Φλαβιανός, Phlabianos; d. 11 August 449), sometimes Flavian I, was the archbishop of Constantinople from 446 to 449. He is venerated as a saint and martyr by the Eastern Orthodox Church and the Catholic Church.

== Consecration as archbishop and imperial dispute ==
Flavian was a presbyter and the guardian of the sacred vessels of the great Church of Constantinople and, according to Nikephoros Kallistos Xanthopoulos, was reputed to lead a saintly life, when he was chosen to succeed Proclus of Constantinople as Archbishop of Constantinople.

During his consecration, Roman Emperor Theodosius II was staying at Chalcedon. His eunuch Chrysaphius attempted to extort a present of gold to the Emperor but as he was unsuccessful, he began to plot against the new archbishop by supporting the archimandrite Eutyches in his dispute with Flavian.

== Home Synod of Constantinople ==
Flavian presided at a council of forty bishops at Constantinople on 8 November 448, to resolve a dispute between the metropolitan bishop of Sardis and two bishops of his province. Eusebius of Dorylaeum, bishop of Dorylaeum, presented an indictment against Eutyches. The speech of Flavian remains, concluding with this appeal to the bishop of Dorylaeum: "Let your reverence condescend to visit him and argue with him about the true faith, and if he shall be found in very truth to err, then he shall be called to our holy assembly and shall answer for himself". Eventually the synod deposed Eutyches.

== Second Council of Ephesus ==
However, Eutyches protested against this verdict and received the support of Pope Dioscorus I of Alexandria, and he fled to Alexandria. The Emperor Theodosius II, already angered by Flavian's refusal to pay him the customary bribe, was persuaded by the eunuch Chrysaphius to convoke another Council to Ephesus. At this council, which assembled on 8 August 449, Eutyches was declared an orthodox teacher and reinstated, while Flavian was anathematised, deposed, and ordered into exile.

== Death and martyrdom ==
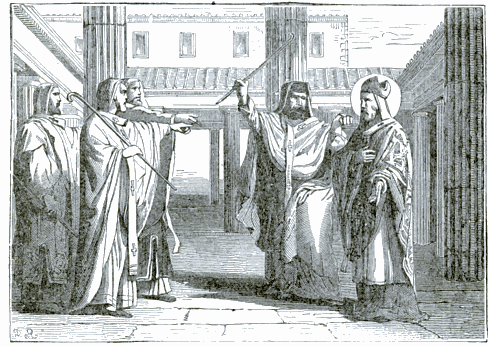
The Martyrdom of Saint Flavian by Shea (1894)

At the previously mentioned second Council of Ephesus at the crux of the council the various leaders opposed to Eutyches' Monophysitism were variously assaulted. Once Flavian's condemnation was read, some of his supporters (namely bishops Onesiphorus of Iconium, Marinianus of Synnada, Nunechius of Laodicea and others) rushed to appeal to Dioscorus, who summoned the counts Helpidius and Eulogius to restore order. They entered the church, led by the proconsul Proclus and followed by soldiers and a mob. Flavian feared for his life and escaped to the sacristry, where he was under guard. He wrote a letter to Pope Leo, which papal legate and future Pope Hilarius conveyed to Rome after escaping Ephesus with much difficulty. Flavian, however, was then beaten, kicked, and trampled over by impudent monks led by a certain Barsauma. He succumbed to his injuries after three days at Epipus in Lydia, and was buried obscurely.

The exact circumstances of Flavian's death, and the extent of Dioscorus' personal responsibility for it, are unclear and remain controversial in Eastern-Oriental Orthodox dialogue. Flavian's letter to Leo says that soldiers "with unsheathed swords" threatened the bishops, and that a crowd of soldiers surrounded him and prevented him from taking sanctuary in the altar, but he does not mention any physical assault. At the Council of Chalcedon two years later, eyewitnesses gave several conflicting accounts. One deacon, Ischyrion, accused Dioscorus of ordering his syncelli (personal clerics) to murder people at Ephesus and even promoting them for the killings. Basil of Seleucia claimed "Armed soldiers burst into the church, and there were arrayed Barsauma and his monks, parabalani, and a great miscellaneous mob" and that Dioscorus controlled the bishops there using "the threats of the mob". According to Diogenes of Cyzicus, a group of Barsauma's monks beat up Flavian while Barsauma cried "Strike him dead!". Finally, some bishops testified that Dioscorus' soldiers killed Flavian with clubs and swords. However, Richard Price and Michael Gaddis question the impartiality of these accounts, noting that these bishops had to place all blame for Flavian's death on Dioscorus to exculpate themselves.

Additional, possibly embellished details about Flavian's death only appear in later authors. The earliest source on Flavian's death, Nestorius, describes how Flavian was beaten at Ephesus, though not to death, and then banished to his home city of Hypaepa. However, the soldiers rushed him to his place of exile (with murderous intent, according to Nestorius), so that Flavian's injuries combined with the fatigue of the journey led to his death after four days. Prosper of Aquitaine, another contemporary, affirms that Flavian was killed by the soldiers taking him to his place of banishment. In a disputed letter to Theodoret dated 11 June 453, Pope Leo blamed Dioscorus in a general sense for Flavian's death. Liberatus of Carthage relates that Flavian suffered blows and died as a result. According to Evagrius Scholasticus, Eusebius of Dorylaeum complained at the council that Dioscorus himself, along with Barsauma's monks, beat and kicked Flavian. Theophanes the Confessor, writing three centuries after the event, mentions that Dioscorus personally struck Flavian "both with hands and feet".

== Aftermath ==
Pope Leo I, whose legates had been ignored at the council, protested, first calling the council a "robber synod", and declared its decisions void.

After Theodosius II died in 450, his sister Pulcheria returned to power, marrying the officer Marcian, who became Emperor. The new Imperial couple had Flavian's remains brought to Constantinople in a way that, in the words of a chronicler, more resembled "a triumph... than a funeral procession". The Council of Chalcedon, called in 451, condemned Eutyches, confirmed Pope Leo's Tome (letter 28) and canonised Flavian as a martyr.

In the Catholic Church St. Flavian is commemorated on 18 February, the date assigned to him in the Roman Martyrology. Flavian of Ricina is sometimes identified with him.

== Notes and references ==
=== Attribution ===
- :
  - Evagrius Scholasticus, ii, 2;
  - Facund, Pro Trib. Capit. viii, 5; xii, 5;
  - Pope Leo I, Epp. 23, 26, 27, 28, 44;
  - Liberatus of Carthage, Breviar, xi, xii;
  - Nikephoros Kallistos Xanthopoulos, Constant, xiv, 47;
  - Sozomen, H. E., ix, 1;
  - Theophanes the Confessor, Chronology pp. 84–88.

== See also ==
- Fravitta of Constantinople, known as Flavian or Flavianus II in some sources

== Bibliography ==
- Meyendorff, John (1989). Imperial unity and Christian divisions - The Church 450–680 AD. The Church in history. Vol. 2. Crestwood, NY: Saint Vladimir's Seminary Press. ISBN 978-0-88-141056-3.

Titles of the Great Christian Church
| Preceded by Proclus | Archbishop of Constantinople; 446 – 449 | Succeeded by Anatolius |
