= Eusebius of Dorylaeum =

Eusebius of Dorylaeum (Greek: Εὐσέβιος) was the 5th-century bishop of Dorylaeum (modern-day Eskişehir, Turkey), who spoke out against dissident teachings, especially those of Nestorius and Eutyches, during the period of Christological controversy. After succeeding in having them expelled from their positions, Eusebius was himself deposed and only reinstated two years later, after which the doctrine in dispute was more precisely defined.

== Early life ==
Eusebius is unknown before his oppositions to Nestorius and Anasthasius in the mid-420s. He is described as being a lawyer or other non-clergy (a layman) involved with the law or court in Constantinople. In some references, he is described as a rhetor.

== Opposition to Nestorius and Anastasius ==
In the late 420s the newly appointed patriarch of Constantinople, Nestorius, and a presbyter named Anastasius (both from Antioch) had been preaching on the Greek word theotókos (“mother of God”) as it is used referring to Mary, mother of Jesus; they were imploring the people that Mary should not be worshiped or referred to as such. Instead, they explained that she should be called christotókos (“mother of Christ”): a symptom of his larger belief that Christ was born a man, and God was dwelling inside or upon him. This quickly drew attention from church officials who disapproved of such a change in terminology regarding Mary, as well as the Christian public.

During one sermon by Nestorius on this topic in AD 428 or 429, Eusebius publicly proclaimed that “the eternal Word had submitted to be born a second time,” getting his fellow listeners at the sermon to drown out Nestorius with sympathetic applause. Soon afterwards, a letter was posted in Constantinople that correlated Nestorius’ teachings with that of Paul of Samosata, an heretical figure from the previous century that had also denied or otherwise challenged the divine nature in Christ. This letter was called the Contestatio and is generally attributed to Eusebius of Dorylaeum. Eusebius may have become a priest soon after this incident.

== First Council of Ephesus (431) ==
Soon after Nestorius’ public opposition from Eusebius came the summoning of a council in Ephesus to settle the problem of his teachings, where Nestorius was ultimately deposed. At this time a presbyter in Constantinople named Eutyches was in alliance with Eusebius of Dorylaeum in opposition to Nestorius, but it is unclear whether either played a major role in the proceedings of the council beyond accusation, which was largely directed by Cyril of Alexandria. Nonetheless, Eusebius must have gained some credit for his Contestatio and outspoken opposition to Nestorius, because at some point between 431 and 448 he was made bishop of Dorylaeum.

== Accusation of Eutyches ==
By 448 Eutyches had set himself up for a confrontation with orthodoxy by espousing views that Christ was made of heavenly flesh and therefore not fully human, or otherwise denying the full humanity of Christ. These views, though opposite of those of Nestorius, were just as unorthodox.

The growing animosity between Eutyches and other clergy led to a synod being called by the archbishop Flavian (who had replaced Proclus in 446), and who happened to be out of favor with both Chrysaphius, a powerful minister and godson of Eutyches, and the emperor Theodosius II. This synod, called the Council of Constantinople or sometimes referred to as the "home synod", was presided over by Flavian in Constantinople.

At the synod Eusebius of Dorylaeum presented Flavian with a letter, detailing his complaints against Eutyches, as well as making known his willingness to be a witness against him personally. Eusebius relates that he had warned Eutyches several times in private, but he had gone unheeded. Flavian urged that Eutyches should be called to the synod to defend himself, but Eutyches refused to come as he had vowed to remain in his monastery “as though it were a tomb.” Eusebius pressed his accusation, saying that there were enough witnesses at the synod to confirm his accusations and condemn Eutyches, but Flavian repeatedly sent for Eutyches to come and ask forgiveness. Flavian remarked of Eusebius after one particular session: "You know the zeal of the accuser, fire itself seems cool to him in comparison with pure zeal for religion. God knows! I besought him to desist and yield; as, however, he persisted, what could I do?”

When Eutyches finally stood before the council, he refused to revoke his teachings and was deposed as a heretic.

== Latrocinium or “Robber Council” (449) ==
The year after Eutyches was condemned in Constantinople by Flavian, a council was called by Theodosius II. This council was prompted by an appeal to Theodosius, through Chrysaphius, by Eutyches himself to clear his name, restore his title, and punish his accusers. It would become known as the Latrocinium (“Robber Council”) because of Pope Leo I’s letter to Pulcheria about events that transpired there.

The patriarch of Alexandria, Dioscorus, was appointed to preside over the council, which was held in Ephesus. Flavian was the primary defendant at the council, as he was seen as the one who had deposed Eutyches, but Eusebius of Dorylaeum was also called. During the council Dioscorous dominated the proceedings, not allowing a lengthy letter from Pope Leo I (now known as the Tome of Leo) to be read regarding the nature of Christ, nor allowing Eusebius to speak in his defense. He forced bishops under threat of violence to adopt the council’s proceedings and depose Flavian and Eusebius, which they did. Flavian was beaten or somehow injured in the ensuing riot so that he died a short time later, but Eusebius found sanctuary with Pope Leo I through a letter of appeal.

== Council of Chalcedon (451) ==
The events of 449 were opposed by many, not the least of which was Pulcheria, sister to emperor Theodosius II. When the emperor died, Marcian succeeded him and called the Council of Chalcedon in 451 to resolve the injustices done at the Robber Council. Dioscorous was deposed, Eutyches was condemned a second time, and Eusebius of Dorylaeum was reinstated as bishop; Flavian’s name was also cleared in the annulment of the decisions made at the Latrocinium. Eusebius brought a petition against Dioscorous and is recorded as speaking at the council: “…I have been wronged by Dioscorous; the faith has been wronged; Bishop Flavian was murdered. He together with me was unjustly deposed by Dioscorous.”

The most important outcome of the struggle was a statement of belief known as the Chalcedonian Definition of the faith, which Eusebius of Dorylaeum helped to draft, though his exact significance in that capacity is uncertain.

After the Council of Chalcedon nothing further is known about Eusebius of Dorylaeum.

== Bibliography ==
- Flavian, Eusebius, and T.A. Lacey, Appellatio Flaviani: the letters of appeal from the Council of Ephesus… (London: S.P.C.K., 1903), 19-24.
- Angelo Di Berardino, ed., Encyclopedia of the Early Church, vol. 1 (New York: Oxford University Press, 1992), s.v. “Flavian.”
- Richard Price and Michael Gaddis, trans., Acts of the Council of Chalcedon, vol. 1 (Liverpool: Liverpool University Press, 2005), 130.
- F.L. Cross, ed., The Oxford Dictionary of the Christian Church, 3rd ed., ed. by E.A. Livingstone (New York: Oxford University Press, 1997), s.v. “Latrocinium.”
- G.W. Bowersock, Peter Brown, Oleg Grabar, eds., Late Antiquity - A guide to the post classical world (Cambridge: The Belknap Press of Harvard University Press, 1999), s.v. “Eutyches.”
- Charles Joseph Hefele, A History of the Councils of the Church, vol. 3, A.D. 431 to A.D. 451 (Edinburgh: T. and T. Clark, 1883), 189.
- Averil Cameron, Bryan Ward-Perkins, Michael Witby, eds., The Cambridge Ancient History, vol. 14, Late Antiquity: Empire and Successors A.D. 425-600 (London: Cambridge University Press, 2000), 37-38.
- Nicholas Constas and Proclus, Proclus of Constantinople and the Cult of the Virgin in Late Antiquity..., supplements to Vigiliae Christianae, vol. 66 (Boston: Brill, 2003), 54-55.
- Henry Chadwick, The Church In Ancient Society: from Galilee to Gregory the Great (New York: Oxford University Press, 2001), 528-529.
- William Smith and Henry Wace, eds., A Dictionary of Christian Biography, Literature, Sects, and Doctrines..., vol. 2, Eaba-Hermocrates (London: John Murray, 1880), s.v. “Eusebius of Dorylaeum.” The New Encyclopædia Britannica, 15th ed., vol. 4, s.v. “Eusebius of Dorylaeum.”
- Alexander P. Kazhdan et al., eds., The Oxford Dictionary of Byzantium, vol. 1 (New York: Oxford University Press, 1991), s.v. “Dorylaion.”
