= Pope Dioscorus I of Alexandria =

Head of the Coptic Church from 444 to 454

Saint Dioscorus the Great
- Pope of Alexandria & Patriarch of the See of St. Mark
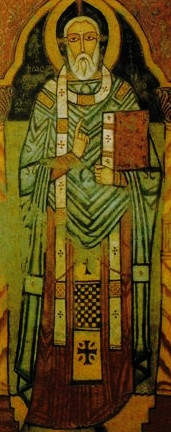
- Coptic icon of St. Dioscorus from the Monastery of Saint Anthony, by Theodore, 13th century
- Church: Coptic Orthodox Church of Alexandria
- Papacy began: 444
- Papacy ended: September 454
- Predecessor: Cyril "Pillar of Faith"
- Successor: Timothy II (Non-Chalcedonian); Proterius (Chalcedonian)

Personal details
- Born: Alexandria, Egypt
- Died: September 454
- Buried: Gangra, Paphlagonia (modern-day Çankırı, Turkey)
- Denomination: Oriental Orthodoxy
- Residence: Saint Mark's Church

Sainthood
- Feast day: 7 Thout in the Coptic calendar (4 September in the Julian calendar) (17 September in the Gregorian calendar [from 1901 to 2099])
- Venerated in: Oriental Orthodox Churches
- Shrines: St Mark Cathedral (Cairo, Egypt)

Dioscorus I (Greek: Διόσκορος Α΄ ὁ Ἀλεξανδρείας), also known as Dioscorus the Great, was the pope of Alexandria and patriarch of the See of St. Mark who was deposed by the Council of Chalcedon in 451. He was recognized as patriarch by the Coptic Church until his death. He died in Gangra, Paphlagonia, in September 454. He is venerated as a saint by the Coptic and other Oriental Orthodox Churches.

== Early life ==
Dioscorus' origins are unknown, although it is known that he was not a Copt. Dioscorus served as the dean of the Catechetical School of Alexandria, and was the personal secretary of Cyril of Alexandria, whom he accompanied to the Council of Ephesus in 431. He eventually rose to the position of archdeacon. He had been made Cyril's designated successor.

== Opposition to Nestorius ==
In his struggle against Nestorius, Cyril explained the union between the divine and human natures of Christ as "inward and real without any division, change, or confusion." He rejected the Antiochene theory of "indwelling", or "conjunction" or "close participation", as insufficient. Thus the Alexandrian formula adopted by Cyril and Dioscorus was, in Greek, mia physis tou theou logou sesarkomene, which translates into "one nature of God the Word Incarnate", by which Cyril meant "one nature"—that Christ is at once God and man. On the other hand, the Antiochene formula was "two natures after the union", or "in two natures", which translates to dyo physis. This formula explained Christ as existing in two natures, God and man.

Nestorius was condemned and deposed by the First Council of Ephesus, which approved of the Second Epistle of Cyril to Nestorius.

== Patriarch of Alexandria ==
Dioscorus succeeded Cyril as Patriarch of Alexandria in the summer of 444.

Soon after Dioscorus' consecration, Theodoret sent a letter (Letter 60) to him. In this letter he praises Dioscorus' modesty and humility, stating: "you do not behold the multitude of your subjects nor the exaltation of your throne, but you see rather human nature, and life's rapid changes, and follow the divine laws whose observance gives us the kingdom of heaven". Though being theologically opposed to him, Theodoret always positively represents Dioscorus' qualities. Theodoret had written against the 12 Anathemas of Saint Cyril and did not condemn Nestorius until the Council of Chalcedon. W. Bright states that Theodoret's: "testimony in his favour cannot be suspected".

Cyril's nephew Athanasius, who C. Haas describes as a "wealthy Alexandrian priest and potential rival" was a fierce critic of Dioscorus. Immediately after his accession Dioscorus was worried that the influential group of Cyril's relatives would be tempted to sabotage his tenure. He was also legally obliged to persecute them for misappropriating church property. Dioscorus regained property (including boats) for the Church, and destroyed property and fruit trees that had been illegally situated on land belonging to the Church. Athanasius claimed that from the outset of his episcopate, Dioscorus harassed him and his brother by using influence with the court, so that the brother died of distress, and Athanasius, with his aunts, sister-in-law, and nephews, were bereft of their homes by the patriarch's malignity. According to the deacon Ischyrion in the third session of the Council of Chalcedon in 451, Dioscorus had laid waste to property, inflicted fines and exile, as well as buying up and selling at a high price the wheat sent by the government to Libya. In Patriarch Dioscorus of Alexandria: The Last Pharaoh and Ecclesiastical Politics in the Later Roman Empire, V.L. Menze writes that illegal property had been "bearing income to the deacon Ischyrion".

== Reception of Eutyches ==
Eutyches was an archimandrite in Constantinople. In his opposition to Nestorianism, he seemed to take an equally extreme, although opposite view. Eutyches claimed to be a faithful follower of Cyril. In November 448, Flavian, Bishop of Constantinople held a synod regarding a point of discipline connected with the province of Sardis. Eutyches had been accusing various personages of covert Nestorianism, and at the end of the session of this synod one of those inculpated, Eusebius, Bishop of Dorylaeum, brought the question forward, and proffered a counter charge of heresy against the archimandrite. Eutyches was summoned to clarify his position regarding the nature of Christ. When asked whether Christ was in two natures after the union, Eutyches responded by stating: "I confess that our Lord was of two natures before the union, but after the union, one nature... I follow the teaching of the blessed Cyril and the holy Fathers and the holy Athanasius, because they speak of two natures before the union, but after the union and incarnation, they speak not of two natures but of one nature." Flavian had demanded that Eutyches confess two natures. Finding his response unsatisfactory, the synod condemned and exiled Eutyches as well as excommunicating anyone associated with him.

Eutyches appealed against this decision, labeling Flavian a Nestorian, and received the support of Dioscorus. In his famous Tome, Pope Leo I confirmed Flavian's theological position but as he concluded that Eutyches had erred through ignorance, he also requested that Eutyches should be readmitted if he repented.

== Second Council of Ephesus ==
Through the influence of the court official Chrysaphius, the godson of Eutyches, in 449, Emperor Theodosius II convened the Second Council of Ephesus. In remembrance of Cyril's role during the council of 431, the emperor asked Dioscorus to preside over the meetings. The council subsequently decided to reinstate Eutyches and to depose Flavian, as well as Eusebius of Dorylaeum, Theoderet of Cyrrus, Ibas of Edessa, and Domnus II of Antioch. Leo's legates protested but were ignored. Dioscorus and his council proceeded to depose Theodoret and several other bishops. Pope Leo called the council a "robber synod". In the spring of 450 at Nicaea, Dioscorus, while on his way to the court, caused ten bishops whom he had brought from Egypt to sign a document excommunicating Pope Leo. Flavian was sent into exile. Anatolius, who had been the agent of Dioscorus at Constantinople, was appointed his successor.

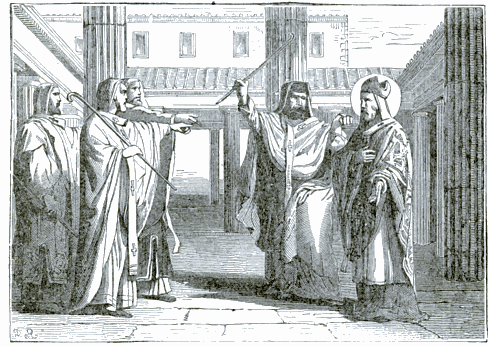
Dioscorus and Barsauma depicted killing Flavian

The common narrative is that Dioscorus partook in and/or ordered an assault on Flavian, who died three days later. However, there are varying accounts at the Council of Chalcedon in 451 of who killed Flavian. Those accused included Dioscorus himself (Session I, Line 30, and many other lines), his soldiers (Session I, Line 54), his personal clerics (Session III, 54), the Bishops of Egypt, Illyricum, and Palestine (Session I, Line 32, 38), Barsauma (Session IV, Line 77, 81), Barsauma's monks (Session I, Line 851), the Parabalani (Session I, Line 851), the Bishops who opposed Dioscorus (Session I, Line 853), a miscellaneous mob (Session I, Line 62, 851) and Juvenal of Jerusalem (Session I, Line 62). In The Exile and Death of Flavian of Constantinople: A Prologue to the Council of Chalcedon, H. Chadwick claims that Pulcheria and possibly Anatolius were most likely responsible because she planned "reunion with Rome" and a council that would overturn unfavourable results at the Second Council of Ephesus. Given they wanted to overturn the results of the council, he notes that Pope Leo I would never have been willing to recognise Anatolius as bishop if Flavian were still alive. Given Flavian was being exiled he would be incapable of pursuing their objectives. Chadwick states that: "Nothing could have been easier than to arrange an unfortunate 'accident'. Nothing would have been more convenient to Pulcheria and the patriarch than his removal from the scene." When Flavian is killed and Anatolius comes to power, Chadwick notes a "dramatic decision to throw Dioscorus aside, to reassert the claims of his see to be the second see of Christendom, and to accept, as a necessary bargain, the Tome of Leo." He sees these facts as indicating Flavian's death was ultimately in Pulcheria and Marcian's best interest.

Additional, possibly embellished details about Flavian's death only appear in later authors. The earliest source on Flavian's death, Nestorius, describes how Flavian was beaten at Ephesus, though not to death, and then banished to his home city of Hypaepa. However, the soldiers rushed him to his place of exile (with murderous intent, according to Nestorius), so that Flavian's injuries combined with the fatigue of the journey led to his death after four days. Prosper of Aquitaine, another contemporary, affirms that Flavian was killed by the soldiers taking him to his place of banishment. In a disputed letter to Theodoret dated 11 June 453, Pope Leo blamed Dioscorus in a general sense for Flavian's death. Liberatus of Carthage relates that Flavian suffered blows and died as a result. According to Evagrius Scholasticus, Eusebius of Dorylaeum complained at the council that Dioscorus himself, along with Barsauma's monks, beat and kicked Flavian. Theophanes the Confessor, writing three centuries after the event, mentions that Dioscorus personally struck Flavian "both with hands and feet". The detail of Flavian clutching the altar as he was beaten is also a later invention.

Theodosius supported the council's decisions until he died on 28 July 450. His sister Pulcheria returned to power and made the officer Marcian her consort and emperor. She consulted with Pope Leo on convoking a new council, gathering signatures for his Tome to be introduced as the basic paper for the new council, but also insisted, against Leo's wishes, that the council should be held not in Italy but in the East. Meanwhile, the new imperial couple brought Flavian's remains back to Constantinople and exiled Eutyches to Syria.

== Council of Chalcedon ==
The Council of Chalcedon in October 451 dealt with the Christological views of Eutyches but also with Dioscorus' views and earlier behaviour; specifically, his condemnation of the bishop Flavian in Ephesus II was questioned. When, at the Council of Chalcedon, he was asked why he had deposed Flavian, he, according to the minutes of Chalcedon, responded, "Flavian was deposed for this reason, that he spoke of two natures after the union. But I have quotations from the holy fathers Athanasius, Gregory and Cyril saying in numerous places that one should not speak of two natures after the union".

At the council, Dioscorus expressed a willingness to condemn Eutyches. According to the minutes of the council of Chalcedon, Dioscorus stated: "If Eutyches holds opinions contrary to the doctrines of the church, he deserves not only punishment but hell fire. For my concern is for the apostolic faith and not for any human being."

The council deposed Dioscorus and other bishops that had been responsible for the decisions of 449 for violations of canon law rather than of heresy; Dioscorus had not attended the council of Chalcedon from the third session onward despite an imperial call to do so, which was a deposable offence. According to the minutes of the council of Chalcedon, Dioscorus had given the reason of ill health for his nonattendance from the third session. However, historical accounts from the Eastern Orthodox Church note that Dioscorus was put under solitary arrest. As a result, he was condemned, but by an underwhelming amount (more than half the bishops present for the previous sessions did not attend his condemnation), and all of his decrees were declared null. Empress Pulcheria (Marcian's wife) told Dioscorus "In my father's time, there was a man who was stubborn (referring to St. John Chrysostom) and you are aware of what was made of him", to which Dioscorus famously responded "And you may recall that your mother prayed at his tomb, as she was bleeding of sickness". Pulcheria is said to have slapped Dioscorus in the face, breaking some of his teeth, and ordered the guards to confine him, which they did pulling his beard hair. Dioscorus is said to have put these in a box and sent them back to his Church in Alexandria noting "this is the fruit of my faith." Marcian responded by exiling Dioscorus to Gangra.

== Exile ==
Following Dioscorus's deposition and exile, an Alexandrian priest named Proterius was appointed Patriarch in his stead, with the approval of the emperor. When Proterius returned to Alexandria, he was met by a riot. The native Christians continued to support Dioscorus as the legitimate Patriarch.

Dioscorus died in exile in 454. When the news reached Egypt, his supporters assembled and elected Timothy, a disciple of his, to be the new Patriarch. Timothy immediately went into hiding, but was recognized among the Coptic inhabitants of the countryside, creating the split between the Coptic and the Melchite (i.e. Royal) Church.

== Legacy ==
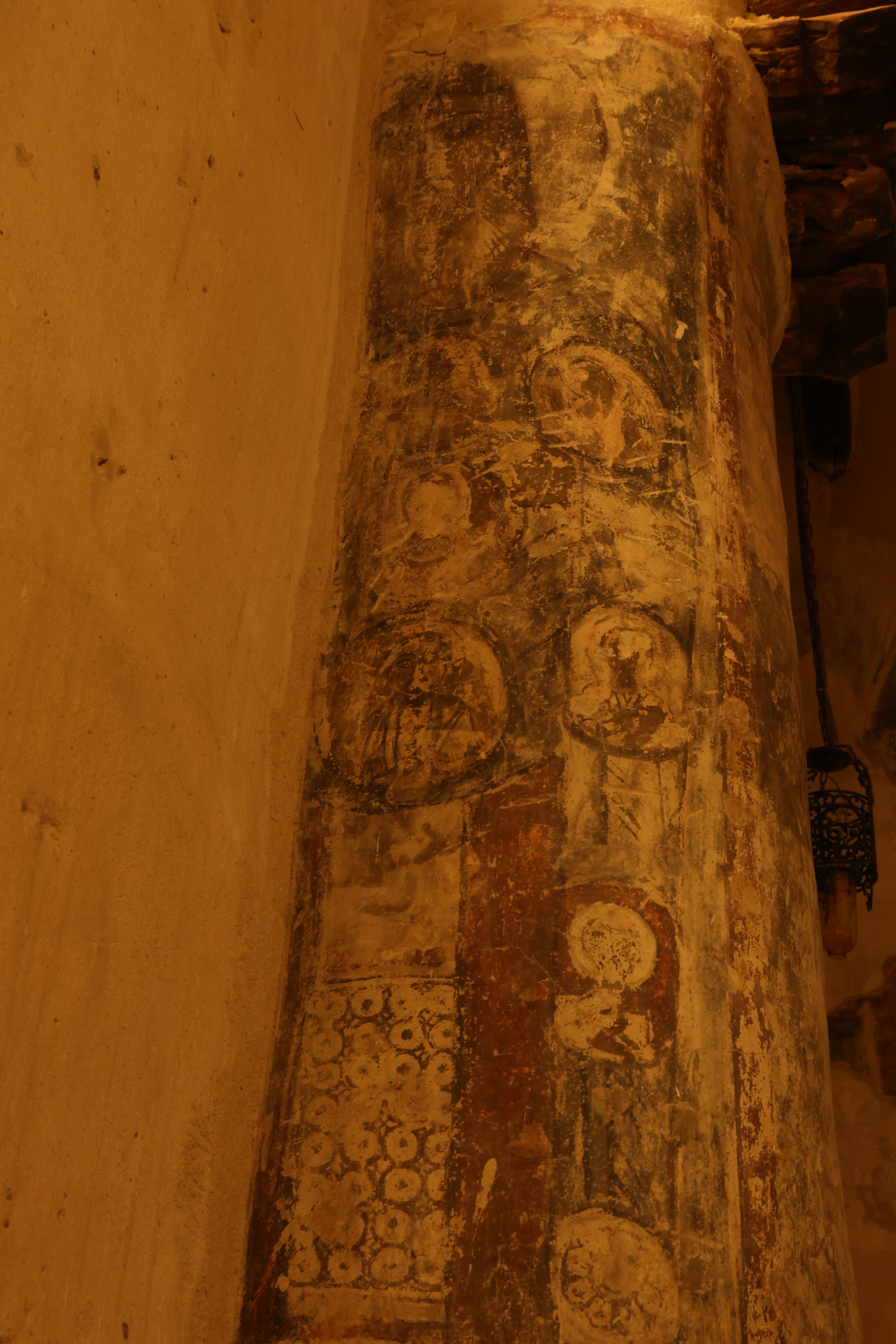
Fresco of Dioscuros of Alexandria in the Syrian Monastery, He was intentionally depicted on a column, to signify his status as "Column of Faith", along with St.Severus of Antioch, Oriental Orthodoxy's most fierce defender.

Oriental Orthodox Churches remain in disagreement with Eastern Orthodox and Catholic churches regarding Dioscorus's character and positions. He is considered a saint by the Coptic, Syriac, and other Oriental Orthodox Churches, while Eastern Orthodox and Catholic churches have frequently deemed him a heretic.

Certain modern theologians (as well as ancient ones like Basil of Seleucia) suggest that both Leo and Dioscorus were orthodox in their agreement with Saint Cyril's Twelve Chapters, even though both have been (and still are) considered heretical by some. Some commentators like Anatolius and John S. Romanides argue that Dioscorus was not deposed for heresy but for "grave administrative errors" at Ephesus II, among which they mention his restoration of Eutyches, his attack on Flavian, and afterwards, his excommunication of Pope Leo I. Defenders of Dioscorus argue that Eutyches was orthodox at the time of his restoration and only later lapsed into heresy, that Flavian was a Nestorian, and that Pope Leo had supported Nestorianism.

Another controversial aspect of Dioscorus's legacy is the accusation, frequently levelled by Chalcedonian churches, that the Oriental Orthodox Churches accept Eutychianism. They deny this charge, arguing that they reject both the Monophysitism of Eutyches, whom they consider a heretic, as well as Dyophysitism espoused by the Council of Chalcedon, which they equate with Nestorianism, for a doctrine they term miaphysitism, or that in Jesus Christ, divinity and humanity exist as "one incarnate nature" (physis), as opposed to the Chalcedonian teaching of a divine and a human nature united in the one person (hypostasis) of Jesus Christ, fully God and fully man, a doctrine called the "hypostatic union".

In recent times, Oriental Orthodox churches have engaged in ecumenical dialogue with Catholic and Eastern Orthodox churches on the issues of Dioscorus's day. In May 1973 Pope Shenouda III of Alexandria visited Pope Paul VI in Rome and declared a common faith in the nature of Christ, the issue which caused the schism of the church in the Council of Chalcedon.

A similar declaration was reached between the Oriental and Eastern Orthodox churches in 1990 in Geneva, in which both agreed in condemnation of the Nestorian and Eutychian "heresies" and in rejection of interpretations of ecumenical councils which do not fully agree with the Horos of the Third Ecumenical Council and the letter (433) of Cyril of Alexandria to John of Antioch. They also agreed to lift the anathemas and condemnations of the past. In the summer of 2001, the Coptic Orthodox and Greek Orthodox Patriarchates of Alexandria agreed to mutually recognize baptisms performed in each other's churches.

== Sources ==
- Meyendorff, John (1989). Imperial unity and Christian divisions: The Church 450-680 A.D. The Church in history. Vol. 2. Crestwood, New York: St. Vladimir's Seminary Press. ISBN 978-0-88-141056-3.
- Menze, Volker-Lorenz (2023). Patriarch Dioscorus of Alexandria: the last pharaoh and ecclesiastical politics in the Later Roman Empire. Oxford, United Kingdom New York: Oxford University Press. ISBN 9780192871336.
- Wilde, Clare (2022). "The Qurʾānic Rūm: A Late Antique Perspective". In van den Bent, Josephine; van den Eijnde, Floris; Weststeijn, Johan (eds.). Late Antique Responses to the Arab Conquests. Brill. pp. 32–55.
- St. Dioscorus, 25th Pope of Alexandria.
- Seleznyov, Nikolai N. (2010). "Nestorius of Constantinople - Condemnation, Suppression, Veneration: With special reference to the role of his name in East-Syriac Christianity". Journal of Eastern Christian Studies. 62 (3–4): 165–190.

Titles of Early Christianity
Preceded by Cyril I	Pope and Patriarch of Alexandria (before schism); 444–451	Succeeded by Proterius I
Preceded by Cyril I	Coptic Orthodox Pope of Alexandria; 444–454	Succeeded by Timothy II
