= Flavian of Ricina =

Bishop in 3rd century Italy

Saint Flavian of Ricina

Bishop
- Died: 3rd century
- Venerated in: Roman Catholic Church
- Major shrine: Rambona
- Feast: November 24
- Patronage: Conversano; Recanati

Saint Flavian of Ricina (Italian: San Flaviano di Ricina) is venerated as a martyr and bishop by the Catholic Church. Tradition holds that he was a bishop of Helvia Ricina (Macerata), during the 3rd century, martyred on November 24. His cult is ancient and widespread in the Marche and Umbria, with many churches and abbeys dedicated to him, but historical information on his life is limited to a few details and traditions.

He is sometimes identified with Archbishop Flavian of Constantinople.

== Veneration ==
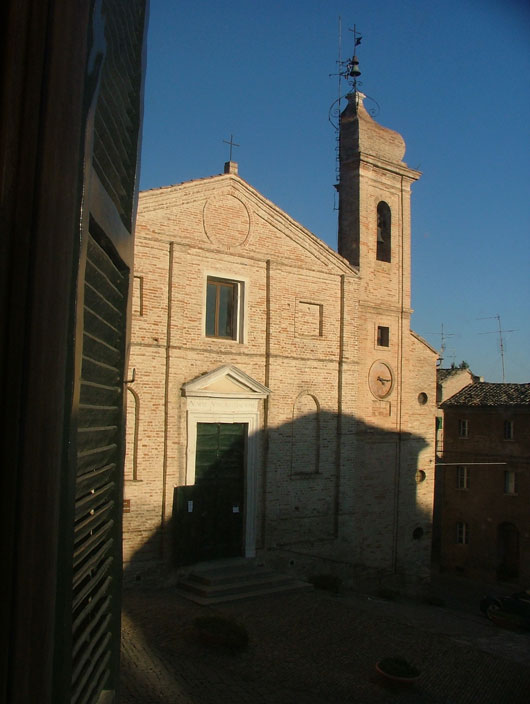
Recanati Cathedral, dedicated to San Flaviano (1804)

One of Flavian's successors in the see of Ricina, Saint Claudius (4th century), fixed the date of Flavian's feast day and also built and dedicated a church to him. Ricina was destroyed by the Goths during the 5th and 6th centuries, and its inhabitants emigrated to Recanati, thus spreading Flavian's cult. Other groups of refugees carried the relics of the saint in the direction of Tolentino, erecting an oratory in honor of Flavian, on a site that may have been associated with a pagan deity. On the site of this oratory, the Benedictine Rambona Abbey still preserves Flavian's relics.

The sarcophagus purported to carry his relics actually dates from the 4th century and as Antonio Borelli points out, this fact casts doubt on the authenticity of Flavian's relics, which were carried there – at least according to the tradition - two centuries later. One explanation is that the relics were not carried there at all, but were already at Rambona when the inhabitants of Ricina arrived there, or that they belonged to a different saint: Saint Amicus (Amico), abbot of Rambona.

The cult of Saint Flavian in Recanati nearly died out in the 15th century before reviving once again after a plague hit the city in 1483; a procession in honor of the saint was held in that year and Father Bonfini, a scholar from Ascoli Piceno, wrote a panegyric in honor of the saint, in November 1483.
