= Chrysaphius =

5th century Byzantine eunuch and chief minister

Chrysaphius (Greek: Χρυσάφιος) was a eunuch in the Eastern Roman court who became the chief minister of Theodosius II (r. 402–450). Having a great influence on the rule of the empire during his ascendancy, he pursued a policy of appeasement towards the Huns, which cost the empire far more gold than any military campaign, while amassing a vast fortune in bribes himself. He is depicted as a sinister figure in all the ancient accounts.

== Life and policies ==
The Byzantine historians give us a considerable amount of information on Chrysaphius. His real name was Taiouma (Theophanes 151) or Tumna (Cedrenus I 601) or Tzoumas (Patria II 182; George Codinus 47) or even Ztommas (Malalas 363–6). Chrysaphius exercised a considerable influence on Theodosius II at the end of his reign. According to Malalas, Theodosius II loved Chrysaphius for his beauty (Malalas id and 368). He seems to have risen from among the ranks: according to Malalas, he was a mere cubicularius (servant of the imperial bedchamber); according to the Chronicon Paschale, he was a spatharios (p. 390).

In 441 the city prefect in Constantinople was a pagan poet from Panopolis in Egypt named Cyrus, who was exceedingly popular in the city. Thus he incurred the envy of Chrysaphius, who engineered his downfall. Cyrus saved himself by converting to Christianity, but the malice of Chrysaphius was not so easily frustrated, and the eunuch arranged for him to be appointed bishop of Cotyaeum in Phyrgia, where the population had lynched the previous four incumbents. In the event, Cyrus survived and returned to Constantinople in 451 after the death of Chrysaphius.

In 443, he became grand chamberlain (praepositus sacri cubiculi), which in practice made him one of the chief advisors of Theodosius II. Chroniclers record that he was all-powerful in the Palace (Theoph. 150; Priscus 227); the later Patria (II 182; Codinus 47) names him anachronistically as a parakoimomenos, after the all-powerful eunuch officials of the 9th-10th centuries. In the Chronicle written by Theophanes the Confessor in the 9th century, he was said to have schemed against the emperor's sister Pulcheria by exalting the influence of the empress Eudocia, and succeeded in arranging her withdrawal from the court. Having done this, he intrigued against the empress, accusing her of adultery with Paulinus, a boyhood friend of the emperor. She was then banished in 444. Having removed both the emperor's wife and sister from the court, Chrysaphius was effectively ruler of the empire, and it is said that the emperor signed papers without reading them (Theophanes, A.M. 5942). However, historians closer to his time such as Priscus (a contemporary of Chrysaphius), John Malalas and Marcellinus Comes do not mention Chrysaphius among the reasons for Eudocia's exile.

In December 447, the Hunnic king Attila arrived before the walls of Constantinople. Chrysaphius adopted a policy of appeasement, and the imperial government paid Attila a huge tribute to go away, rather than fight.

Chrysaphius had also been involved in the ecclesiastical disputes of the time, and taking bribes from the various parties he amassed a great fortune. He was the godson of the aged Cyrillian abbot Eutyches, whom he hoped to place on the episcopal throne of Constantinople and so increase his own political influence. This was prevented by the elevation of Flavian in 447. Chrysaphius therefore induced the emperor to require a gift from the new bishop. Flavian sent the emperor three loaves of consecrated bread, which Chrysaphius rejected, on the grounds that the emperor demanded gold. Flavian refused to supply this on the ground that churchmen should not hand over church property as bribes (Evagrius II.2). This made Chrysaphius his enemy, but Pulcheria was still influential and defended Flavian. Chrysaphius did arrange for a violent enemy of Flavian's, Dioscorus, to be appointed Patriarch of Alexandria, and arranged for the exile of Pulcheria.

In 448 the Eutychian dispute arose, Eutyches bribed Chrysaphius. Flavian was reluctant to be drawn in, but organised a local council in Constantinople, which condemned Eutyches in 448. Chrysaphius, however, was able to use Dioscorus to depose Flavian at the "Robber-synod" (Latrocinium) of Ephesus in August 449. He used the soldiers and puppet clerics to prevent any discussion of the issues. Flavian died a few days after the closure of the Latrocinium because of the injuries suffered from the mob of Dioscorus' monks, led by the dreaded abbot Barsaumas, "a wild, illiterate Syrian archimandrite".

The Hunnic problem had not gone away. In 449, Chrysaphius, with the approval of Theodosius, suborned Edecon, the chief of Attila's guards, to assassinate him. But he later betrayed the plot to Attila, who demanded the head of Chrysaphius. Chrysaphius sent an envoy with money, and Attila consented in contemptuous language to forgive him and the emperor provided that he received an annual compensation payment of 700 pounds of gold a year. This burden of taxes on an empire already devastated by the ravages of the Huns made the already unpopular favorite deeply hated. Gibbon remarks that the money involved would have more than financed any war against Attila.

The high-handed behavior at the Latrocinium also back-fired. There was general opposition to the decisions of the council, and Pope Leo I wrote to the emperor and demanded a fresh council.

It seems that Chrysaphius may have fallen out of favour in the last months of Theodosius' reign. He had an enemy in the Isaurian Zeno, Master of Soldiers, who seems to have threatened a revolt in 449. See John Ant. fr. 84 (De ins.), and Priscus, fr. 5 (De leg. Rom.).

== Death ==
Theodosius II died in 450, and was succeeded by Marcian, who married Pulcheria. Both were personal enemies of Chrysaphius.

His fate is described differently in the historians. According to most, Pulcheria avenged herself against Chrysaphius by handing him over to his mortal enemy Jordanes, who had him put to death (Theophanes 160; Chronicon Paschale 390; Malalas 368; Zonaras; III 107–109, Cedrenus I 601–1603). However, according to Malalas, Chrysaphius's cause of death was very different. Chrysaphius had been head of the Green faction, whom Theodosius had protected (Malalas 351). Chrysaphius's death sentence was apparently politically motivated. Supported by the Greens, Chrysaphius may have incited some unrest, and it is known that Marcian was a partisan of the Blues (Malalas 368). Some say that Marcian ordered him to appear before a tribunal to enquire into his misdeeds. On the way there, the fallen minister was stoned to death by a mob infuriated by the high taxes needed to pay Attila's tribute. His immense wealth was confiscated.

The political career of Chrysaphius is recorded by the Byzantine historian Nicephorus Callistus Xanthopoulos, who deals with his actions in the critical years 449–451. Evagrius Scholasticus also records some of his actions in church matters.

== Chrysaphius in fiction ==
The conspiracy against Attila is a significant plot element in Geza Gardonyi's novel Slave of the Huns. In this account, the head of Chrysaphius really is given to Attila, transported preserved in honey. Chrysaphius also features in Gillian Bradshaw's novel, Imperial Purple, about a conspiracy to usurp the imperial throne.
