= Anatolius of Constantinople =

Patriarch of Constantinople from 449 to 458

Saint Anatolius of Constantinople
- Patriarch of Constantinople
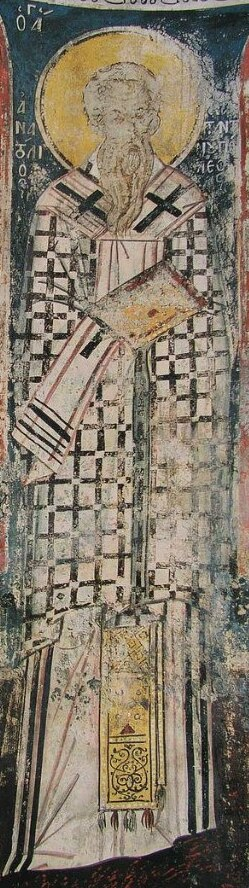
- Fresco from Dionysiou Monastery
- Installed: November 449
- Term ended: 3 July 458
- Predecessor: Flavian of Constantinople
- Successor: Gennadius of Constantinople

Personal details
- Born: Alexandria, Egypt
- Died: 3 July 458 Constantinople, Eastern Roman Empire
- Denomination: Chalcedonian Christianity

Sainthood
- Feast day: 3 July
- Venerated in: Roman Catholic Church; Eastern Orthodox Church; Lutheran Church
- Attributes: Vested as a bishop with omophorion, holding a Gospel Book

Anatolius of Constantinople (Greek: Ἀνατόλιος; died 3 July 458) was a Patriarch of Constantinople (November 449 – 3 July 458). He is regarded as a saint, by both the Orthodox and Catholic Churches, along with the Lutheran Church.

== Life ==
Anatolius was born at Alexandria. He was ordained a deacon by Cyril of Alexandria, and was present at the Council of Ephesus in the year 431.

He became Patriarch through the influence of Pope Dioscorus I of Alexandria and Emperor Theodosius II, following the deposition of Flavian of Constantinople by the Second Council of Ephesus in 449. Prior to his elevation, he had served as the apocrisiarius (representative) of Dioscorus with the emperor at Constantinople. After his consecration, Anatolius, being under suspicion of Eutychianism, publicly condemned the teachings of both Eutyches and Nestorius, subscribing to the letters of Cyril of Alexandria against Nestorius and of Pope Leo I against Eutyches.

In conjunction with Pope Leo I, according to Joannes Zonaras (Annals, iii), he requested that Emperor Marcian summon a general council against Dioscorus I and the Eutychians, but the Imperial letter instructing Anatolius on preparations for the Council of Chalcedon only mentions Pope Leo I (Philippe Labbe, Conc. Max. Tom., iv). During the council, Anatolius presided alongside the Roman legates (Labbe, Conc. Max. iv; Evagr. H. E., ii, 4, 18; Niceph. H. E., xv, 18).

By the famous 28th canon, passed at the conclusion of the council, Constantinople was granted equal dignity with Rome, being declared "second in eminence and power to the Bishop of Rome". This change displaced the traditional hierarchy of authority of the much older sees of Antioch and Alexandria. As a result, controversy emerged between Anatolius and the Roman pontiff. However, the third canon of the earlier First Council of Constantinople of 381 had already stated that "The Bishop of Constantinople, however, shall have the prerogative of honour after the Bishop of Rome because Constantinople is New Rome". Both positions in this dispute could be characterised as being political in nature, as opposed to a doctrinal view.

Pope Leo I complained to Marcian (Ep. 54) and to Pulcheria (Ep. 55) that Anatolius had outstepped his jurisdiction by consecrating Maximus II of Antioch as Patriarch of Antioch, as well as protesting to Anatolius (Ep. 53).

Following the council of Chalcedon, Anatolius received a letter signed by several Egyptian bishops, requesting his assistance against Timothy II of Alexandria, who was usurping the Patriarch of Alexandria (Labbe, Conc. Max., iv, iii, 23, p. 897). In response, Anatolius wrote to emperor Leo I against Timothy (Labbe, iii, 26, p. 905). The circular of the emperor requesting the advice of Anatolius on the turbulent state of Alexandria is given by Evagrius Scholasticus (H. E., ii, 9), and by Nikephoros Kallistos Xanthopoulos (H. E., xv, 18). Edward Gibbon states that the crowning of Leo I on his accession by Anatolius is the first instance of the kind on record (Theophanes the Confessor, Chronicle, p. 95). When he was near death he was restored to health by Daniel the Stylite, who traveled to Constantinople to see him.

It is also said that the followers of Dioscorus I were responsible for his death in 458.

Anatolius was credited with composing a few hymns.

== Bibliography ==
- Meyendorff, John (1989). Imperial unity and Christian divisions - The Church 450–680 AD. The Church in history. Vol. 2. Crestwood, NY: Saint Vladimir's Seminary Press. ISBN 978-0-88-141056-3.
- "Lives of the Saints", Omer Englebert, New York, Barnes & Noble, 1994, p. 532, ISBN 1-56619-516-0 (casebound).

Titles of Chalcedonian Christianity
Preceded by Flavian	Patriarch of Constantinople; Archbishop until 451; 449 – 458	Succeeded by Gennadius
