= Second Council of Ephesus =

449 AD Christian church synod

Coordinates: 37°56′42″N 27°20′21″E

- Date: 449
- Accepted by: Oriental Orthodox Churches
- Previous council: First Council of Ephesus
- Next council: Council of Chalcedon (not accepted by the Oriental Orthodox)
- Convoked by: Emperor Theodosius II
- President: Dioscorus of Alexandria
- Attendance: 130
- Topics: Christology, Nestorianism, Monophysitism
- Documents and statements: Condemnations of Flavianus of Constantinople, Pope Leo I, Theodoret, and Domnus II of Antioch

The Second Council of Ephesus was a Christological church synod in 449 convened by Emperor Theodosius II under the presidency of Pope Dioscorus I of Alexandria. It was intended to be an ecumenical council, and it is accepted by the miaphysite churches, who view it as a valid continuation of the First Council of Ephesus if not an ecumenical council in its own right. The Second Council of Ephesus was explicitly repudiated by the next council, the Council of Chalcedon of 451. The Council of Chalcedon is recognized as the fourth ecumenical council by Chalcedonian Christians, and the Second Council of Ephesus was named the Latrocinium ("Robber Synod") by Pope Leo I; the Chalcedonian churches, particularly the Roman Catholic and Eastern Orthodox communions, continue to accept this designation, while the Oriental Orthodox repudiate it.

Both this council and that at Chalcedon dealt primarily with Christology, the study of the nature of Christ. Both councils affirmed the doctrine of the hypostatic union and upheld the orthodox Christian doctrine that Jesus Christ is both fully God and fully man. The Second Council of Ephesus decreed the formula of Cyril of Alexandria, stating that Christ is one incarnate nature [mia physis] (a qualitative description of the union of divinity and humanity), fully human and fully God, united without separation, without confusion, without mixture and without alteration. The Council of Chalcedon decreed that in Christ two natures exist, "a divine nature [physis] and a human nature [physis], united in one person [hypostasis], with neither division nor confusion".

Those who do not accept the decrees of Chalcedon nor later ecumenical councils are variously named monophysites, miaphysites, or non-Chalcedonians, and comprise what is today known as Oriental Orthodoxy, a communion of six autocephalous ecclesial communions: Coptic Orthodox Church of Alexandria, Ethiopian Orthodox Tewahedo Church, Eritrean Orthodox Tewahedo Church, Malankara Orthodox Syrian Church, Syriac Orthodox Church, and the Armenian Apostolic Church. Those who accepted the teaching of Chalcedon but resided in areas dominated by Oriental Orthodox bishops were called by the non-Chalcedonians Melkites ("King's men"), as the Emperors were usually Chalcedonians. The Greek Orthodox Patriarchate of Antioch and Melkite Greek Catholic Church historically descend from these people. Shortly after the Council of Chalcedon, Pope Dioscorus was deposed by the Council of Chalcedon but still recognized by Miaphysites until his death in 454 followed by Pope of Alexandria for the miaphysite party in opposition to the Chalcedonian Pope of Alexandria. Over the next few centuries, Alexandrian popes were generally either miaphysite or Chalcedonian, but some instead accepted the Henotikon, a compromise document issued by the Byzantine emperor Zeno. Eventually, two separate papacies were established, each claiming sole legitimacy.

== Background ==
Nestorius was Archbishop of Constantinople. His opponents charged him with detaching Christ's divinity and humanity into two persons existing in one body, thereby denying the reality of the Incarnation. It is not clear whether Nestorius actually taught that. A combination of politics and personalities contributed to Nestorius being judged a heretic and deposed at the Council of Ephesus in 431 AD. John Anthony McGuckin sees an "innate rivalry" between the Sees of Alexandria and Constantinople.

Eutyches was an archmandrite in Constantinople. In his opposition to Nestorianism, he seemed to take an equally extreme, although opposite view. In 448, Flavian, Bishop of Constantinople held a synod at which Eusebius, Bishop of Dorylaeum, brought a charge of heresy against Eutyches. Eutyches was summoned to appear and clarify his position regarding the nature of Christ. Finding his response unsatisfactory, the synod condemned and exiled Eutyches, who sent an appeal to Pope Leo I. When Leo had received the Acts of the council, he concluded that Eutyches was a foolish old man who had erred through ignorance, and might be restored if he repented. Dioscurus of Alexandria, imitating his predecessors in assuming a primacy over Constantinople, simply annulled the sentence of Flavian, and absolved Eutyches. Dioscurus and Eutyches had obtained the convocation by the Emperor of an ecumenical council to meet at Ephesus in August, 449.

== First session ==
The Acts by the Second Council of Ephesus are known through a Syriac translation by a monk, that was published by the British Museum (MS. Addit. 14,530) and written in 535. The first session is missing.

=== Attending signatories ===
There was insufficient time for Western bishops to attend except a certain Julius, Bishop of Puteoli, who, together with a Roman priest, Renatus (who died on the way), and the deacon Hilarius (who later became Pope himself), represented Pope Leo I. The emperor gave Dioscorus of Alexandria the presidency: ten authentian kai ta proteia (Greek). The legate Julius is mentioned next, but when his name was read at Chalcedon, the bishops cried: "He was cast out; no one represented Leo". Next in order is Juvenal of Jerusalem, above both the Patriarch Domnus II of Antioch and Patriarch Flavian of Constantinople.

There were 127 bishops present at the council, with eight representatives of absent bishops, and lastly the deacon Hilarius with his notary, Dulcitius. The question before the council, by order of the emperor, was whether Archbishop Flavian of Constantinople, in a synod held by him at Constantinople beginning on 8 November 448 AD, had deposed and excommunicated Archimandrite Eutyches for refusing to admit two natures in Christ. Consequently, Flavian and six other bishops, who had been present at his synod, were not allowed to sit as judges in the council.

=== Opening proceeding ===
The brief of convocation by Theodosius II was read. Then the legates to the Pope of the Church of Rome explained that although it would have been contrary to custom for their Pope to be present in person, the Pope of the Church of Rome had sent a letter with the legates to be read at the council. In the letter, Leo I referred to his dogmatic letter to Flavian, the Tome of Leo, which he intended the council to accept as a ruling of faith.

However, the head notary declared that the emperor's letter should be read first, and Bishop Juvenal of Jerusalem commanded for the letter of the emperor to be presented. It ordered the presence at the council of the anti-Nestorian monk Barsumas. The question of faith was next on the proceedings. Pope (Patriarch of Alexandria) Dioscorus declared that it was not a matter for inquiry but that they had to consider only recent activity, as all present had acknowledged that they strictly adhered to the faith. He was acclaimed as a guardian and the Champion of Oriental Orthodoxy.

Eutyches was then introduced, and he declared that he held the Nicene Creed to which nothing could be added and from which nothing could be taken away. He claimed that he had been condemned by Flavian for a mere slip of the tongue even though he had declared that he held the faith of Nicaea and Ephesus, and he had appealed to the present council. His life had been put in danger and he now asked for judgment against the calumnies that had been brought against him.

Eutyches's accuser, Bishop Eusebius of Dorylaeum, was not allowed to be heard. The bishops agreed that the acts of the condemnation of Eutyches, at the 448 Constantinople council, should be read, but the legates of Rome asked that Leo's letter might be heard first. Eutyches interrupted with the complaint that he did not trust the legates. They had been to dine with Flavian and had received much courtesy. Pope Dioscorus decided that the acts of the trial should have precedence and so the letter of Leo I was not read.

The acts were then read in full and also the account of an inquiry made on 13 April 449 into the allegation of Eutyches that the synodal acts had been incorrectly noted down, and then the account of another inquiry, on 27 April 449, into the accusation made by Eutyches that Flavian had drawn up the sentence against him beforehand. While the trial was being related, cries arose from those present, declaring a belief in one nature, that two natures meant Nestorianism, and of "Burn Eusebius", and so forth. Flavian rose to complain that no opportunity was given to him to defend himself.

The Acts of the Second Council of Ephesus now give a list of 114 votes in the form of short speeches absolving Eutyches; three of his former judges also absolved him but by the emperor's order they were not allowed to vote. Lastly, Barsumas added his voice. A petition was read from Eutyches's monastery which had been excommunicated by Flavian. The monks asserted that they agreed in all things with Eutyches and with the Holy Fathers, and therefore the synod absolved them.

An extract from the acts of the first session of the First Council of Ephesus (431 AD) was read next. Many of the bishops and also the deacon Hilarus expressed their assent, some adding that nothing beyond that faith could be allowed.

Dioscorus then spoke, declaring that it followed that Flavian and Eusebius must be deposed, as if an anathema was passed unjustly, and he who passed it was to be judged by the same. Flavian and Eusebius had previously interposed an appeal to the Roman Pope and to a synod held by him.

Evidence given at the ecumenical Council of Chalcedon contradicts the account in the acts of the final scene of the session. It was reported at Chalcedon that secretaries of the bishops had been violently prevented from taking notes and it was declared that both Barsumas and Dioscorus struck Flavian. It was further reported that many bishops threw themselves on their knees to beg Dioscorus for mercy to Flavian and also Alexandrine Parabolani, that some signed a blank paper, and that others did not sign at all, the names being afterwards filled in of all who were actually present. The allegation of the blank papers has no proof at all. No one mentioned it for two years after the council (449-451), even after the passing of Emperor Theodosius II in 450 AD. In the opening of the first session of Chalcedon (451), many allegations against Dioscorus were listed; none of which was the blank papers.

The papal legate Hilarius uttered a single word in Latin, "Contradicitur", annulling the sentence in Leo's name. He then escaped with difficulty. Flavian and Eusebius of Dorylaeum appealed to the pope, and their letters, only lately discovered, were probably taken by Hilarus to Rome, which he reached by a devious route. In his letter to Pulcheria, Hilarus complained that Dioscorus had the roads and docks watched to prevent him from escaping Ephesus, so he had to find a way through the rough country.

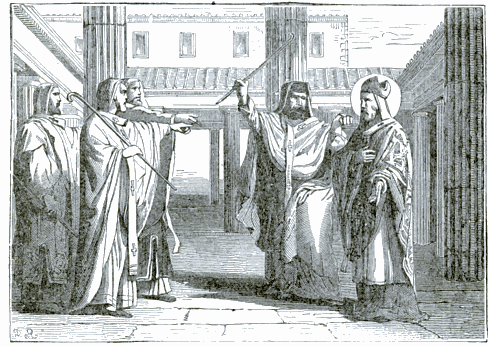
Dioscorus and Barsuma depicted killing Flavian

It was said Dioscorus had previously gathered 1000 monks, telling them to wait outside the church during the council and to come when he called them. When Dioscorus began to read the sentence of condemnation against Flavian and Eusebius, some bishops went up to Dioscorus, asking him not to. Dioscorus called the guards, and the 1000 monks who were waiting outside with some soldiers came in and charged at Flavian and his followers. Flavian ran to the altar and grabbed hold of it for his life. The soldiers and monks forcefully took him from the altar beating him, kicking him and then whipping him. At Chalcedon, Bishop Diogenes of Cyzicus claimed that, while Flavian was being beaten, Barsumas exclaimed "Strike him dead!"

Flavian was deported into exile and died from his wounds a few days later in Lydia. His body was buried in obscurity. It was not until Flavius Marcianus called the Council of Chalcedon that Flavian's body was buried with honour in Constantinople. No more of the Acts were read at Chalcedon. However, Theodoret, Evagrius and others note that the Council voted to depose Theodoret himself, Domnus, and Ibas, Bishop of Edessa, Mesopotamia.

== Subsequent sessions ==
=== Attitude of schism ===
The Syriac Acts take up the history where the Chalcedonian Acts break off. Of the first session, only the formal documents, letters of the emperor, and petitions of Eutyches are known to be preserved in Syriac though not within the same manuscript. It is evident that the non-Chalcedonian editor disapproved of the first session and purposely omitted it, not because of the high-handed proceedings of Dioscorus but because the later Miaphysites generally condemned Eutyches as a heretic and did not wish to remember his rehabilitation by a council that they considered to be ecumenical but the rest of Christianity scorned.

=== Attendance ===
In the next session, according to the Syriac Acts, 113 people were present, including Barsumas. Nine new names appeared. The legates did not appear and were sent for, but only the notary Dulcitius could be found and he was unwell. It was an uncanonical charge against Dioscorus at the Council of Chalcedon that he "had held an (ecumenical) council without the Roman See, which was never allowed". That manifestly refers to his having continued at the council after the departure of the legates.

=== Double jeopardy ===
The first case was that of Ibas, Bishop of Edessa. The famous champion of the Antiochian party, he had been accused of crimes before by Domnus, Bishop of Antioch, and had been acquitted soon after Easter 448. His accusers had gone to Constantinople and been granted a new trial by the emperor. Bishops Photius of Tyre, Eustathius of Berytus and Uranius of Imeria were to examine the matter. The bishops met at Tyre, removed to Berytus, and returned to Tyre. Eventually, in February 449, they acquitted Ibas once more, together with his fellow accused: Daniel, Bishop of Harran and John of Theodosianopolis.

Cheroeas, Governor of Osrhoene l, was then ordered to go to Edessa to start a new inquiry. He was received by the people of Edessa on 12 April 449 with shouts in honour of the emperor, the governor and the late Bishop Rabbula, and against Nestorius and Ibas. The detailed summary of the reception takes up some two or three pages of the report that Cheroeas sent, along with two letters of his own, to Constantinople. The report gave details of the accusations against Ibas, and led to the emperor's ordering for a new bishop to be chosen.

The report, which provided a history of the whole affair, was read at length by the order of Dioscorus. When the famous letter of Ibas to Bishop Maris was read, cries arose such as: "These things pollute our ears. ... Cyril is immortal. ... Let Ibas be burnt in the midst of the city of Antioch. ... Exile is of no use. Nestorius and Ibas should be burnt together!"

A final indictment was made in a speech by a priest of Edessa named Eulogius. Sentence was finally given against Ibas of deposition and excommunication, without any suggestion that he ought to be called to speak in his own defence.

In the next case, that of Ibas's nephew, Daniel of Harran, it was declared that they had clearly seen his guilt at Tyre and had acquitted him only because of his voluntary resignation. He was quickly deposed by the agreement of all the council. He, too, was not present and could not defend himself.

Next was the turn of Irenaeus, who, as an influential layman at the first Council of Ephesus, had been known to favour Nestorius. He had later become Bishop of Tyre, but the emperor had deposed him in 448 under charges of bigamy and blasphemy, and Photius had succeeded him. The synod ratified the deposition of Irenaeus.

Aquilinus, Bishop of Byblus, had been consecrated by Irenaeus and was his friend. He was the next to be deposed. Sophronius, Bishop of Tella, was a cousin of Ibas. He was accused of various forms of divination, including tyromancy (divination with cheese) and oomancy (divination with eggs). His case was reserved for the judgment of the new Bishop of Edessa.

=== Condemnation of Theodoret ===
Theodoret, an opponent of Dioscorus and a personal supporter of Nestorius, had been confined within his own diocese by the emperor in the preceding year to prevent him from preaching at Antioch. Theodoret had been a friend of Nestorius, and for more than three years (431–434 AD) he was a prominent antagonist of Cyril of Alexandria. However, despite the fact the two great theologians had come to terms and had celebrated their agreement, Theodoret was rejected with scorn. Theodosius had twice written to prevent him from coming to the council at Ephesus, and the council found a reason to depose him in his absence.

A monk from Antioch produced a volume of extracts from the works of Theodoret. First was read Theodoret's letter to the monks of the East (see Mansi, V, 1023), then some extracts from a lost Apology for Diodorus and Theodore. The very name of the work was sufficient, in the view of the council, to condemn Theodoret, and Dioscorus pronounced the sentence of deposition and excommunication.

When Theodoret, in his remote diocese, heard of the sentence pronounced in his absence, he at once appealed to Leo in a letter (Ep. cxiii). He also wrote to the legate Renatus (Ep. cxvi), being unaware that he was dead.

=== Condemnation of Domnus ===
The council had a yet-bolder task before it. Domnus of Antioch is said to have agreed in the first session to the acquittal of Eutyches, but he refused, on the plea of sickness, to appear at the later sessions of the council. He seems to have been disgusted or terrified or both at the leadership of Pope Dioscorus. The council had sent him an account of their actions, and he replied, according to the Acts, that he agreed to all the sentences that had been given and regretted that his health made his attendance impossible.

Immediately after receiving this message, the council proceeded to hear a number of petitions from monks and priests against Domnus. Domnus was accused of friendship with Theodoret and Flavian, of Nestorianism, of altering the form of the Sacrament of Baptism, of intruding an immoral bishop into Emessa, of having been uncanonically appointed himself and of being an enemy of Dioscorus. Several pages of the manuscripts are missing, but it does not seem that the patriarch was asked to appear or given a chance to defend himself. The bishops shouted that he was worse than Ibas. He was deposed by a vote of the council, and with that final act, the Acts come to an end.

== Reception ==
The council wrote the customary letter to the emperor (see Perry, trans., p. 431), who confirmed it with his own letter (Mansi, VII, 495, and Perry, p. 364). Dioscorus sent an encyclical to the bishops of the East with a form of adhesion to the council that they were to sign (Perry, p. 375). He also went to Constantinople and appointed his secretary Anatolius as bishop of that see.

Juvenal of Jerusalem was loyal to Dioscorus. He had deposed the Patriarchs of Antioch and Constantinople, but one powerful adversary yet remained. He halted at Nicaea and with ten bishops (probably the same ten Egyptian metropolitans whom he had brought to Ephesus) "in addition to all his other crimes he extended his madness against him who had been entrusted with the guardianship of the Vine by the Saviour", in the words of the bishops at Chalcedon, "and excommunicated the Pope himself".

Meanwhile, Leo I had received the appeals of Theodoret and Flavian (of whose death he was unaware) and had written to them and to the Emperor and Empress, nullifying all of the Acts of the council. He eventually excommunicated all who had taken part in it and absolved all whom it had condemned (including Theodoret), with the exception of Domnus of Antioch, who seems to have had no wish to resume his see and retired into the monastic life that he had left many years earlier with regret.

The Council of Chalcedon gave rise to what has been called the Monophysite Schism between those who accepted the Council of Chalcedon and those who rejected it: many Byzantine emperors over the next several hundred years attempted to reconcile the opposed parties, in the process giving rise to several other schisms and teachings later condemned as heresy, such as monoenergism and monotheletism, which were devised as attempted compromises between the Chalcedonian and non-Chalcedonian parties (cf. the Henotikon and the Three Chapters – the latter itself leading to another schism lasting over a century, the Schism of the Three Chapters).
