= Council of Chalcedon =

451 Christian ecumenical council

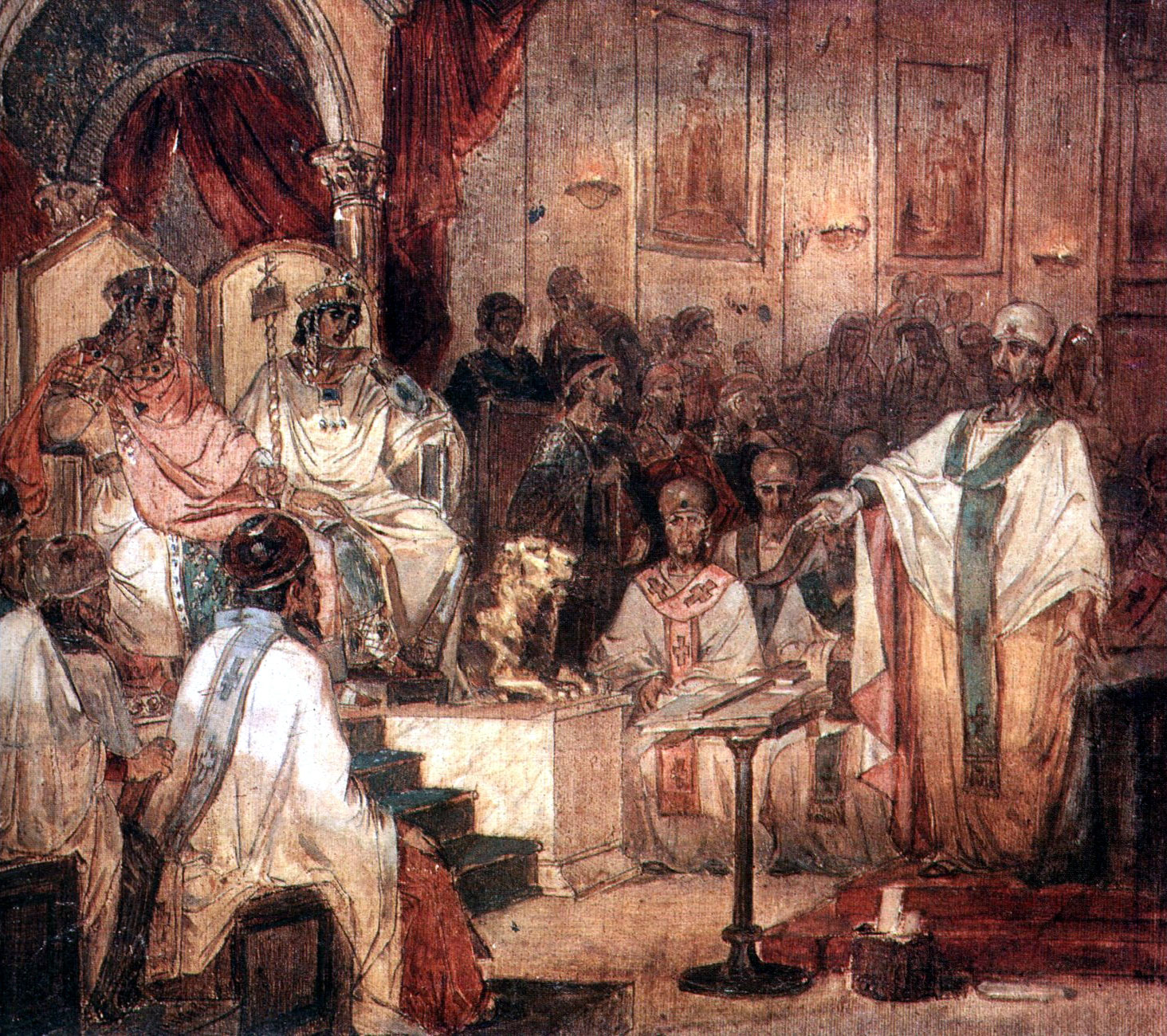
- Fourth Ecumenical Council of Chalcedon, 1876 painting by Vasily Surikov
- Date: 8 October – 1 November 451
- Accepted by: Catholic Church; Eastern Orthodox Church; Church of the East; Old Catholic Church; Lutheran churches; Anglican churches; Reformed churches
- Previous council: Council of Ephesus
- Next council: Second Council of Constantinople
- Convoked by: Emperor Marcian; Augusta Pulcheria
- President: Patriarch Anatolius of Constantinople and a board of government officials led by Consul Anatolius; Formal presidency: legates of Pope Leo I (Julian of Cos, Paschasinus of Lilybaeum, Lucentius of Asculanum, presbyters Boniface and Basil)
- Attendance: About 520 bishops or representatives
- Topics: The judgements issued at the Second Council of Ephesus, alleged offences of Bishop Dioscorus of Alexandria, the definition of the Godhead and manhood of Christ, many disputes involving particular bishops and sees
- Documents and statements: Chalcedonian Creed, 28 canons

The Council of Chalcedon (/kælˈsiːdən, ˈkælsɪdɒn/; Latin: Concilium Chalcedonense) (Note: Ancient Greek: Σύνοδος τῆς Χαλκηδόνος, Synodos tēs Chalkēdonos) was the fourth ecumenical council of the Christian Church. It was convoked by the Roman emperor Marcian. The council convened in the city of Chalcedon, Bithynia (modern-day Kadıköy, Istanbul, Turkey) from 8 October to 1 November 451. The council was attended by over 520 bishops or their representatives, making it the largest and best-documented of the first seven ecumenical councils. The principal purpose of the council was to re-assert the teachings of the ecumenical Council of Ephesus against the teachings of Eutyches and Nestorius. Such doctrines viewed Christ's divine and human natures as separate and distinct (Nestorianism), or viewed Christ as solely divine (monophysitism). The Council of Chalcedon issued the Chalcedonian Definition, stating that Jesus is "perfect both in deity and in humanness; this selfsame one is also actually God and actually man." The council's judgments and definitions regarding the divine marked a significant turning point in the Christological debates.

== Agenda ==
Chalcedon marked on a map of the Istanbul region

The ruling of the council stated:

We all teach harmoniously [that he is] the same perfect in godhead, the same perfect in manhood, truly God and truly man, the same of a reasonable soul and body; homoousios with the Father in godhead, and the same homoousios with us in manhood… acknowledged in two natures without confusion, without change, without division, without separation.

Whilst this judgment marked a significant turning point in the Christological debates, it also generated heated disagreements between the council and the Oriental Orthodox churches, which did not agree with such conduct or proceedings. This disagreement would later cause the Oriental Orthodox Churches and the Chalcedonian churches to schism, and led to the council being regarded as Chalcedon, the Ominous by the Miaphysites.

The council's other responsibilities included addressing controversy, dealing with issues such as ecclesiastical discipline and jurisdiction, and approving statements of belief such as the Creed of Nicaea (325), the Creed of Constantinople (381, subsequently known as the Nicene Creed), two letters of St. Cyril of Alexandria against Nestorius, and the Tome of Pope Leo I. The Christology of the Church of the East may be called "non-Ephesine" for not accepting the Council of Ephesus, but it did finally gather to ratify the Council of Chalcedon at the Synod of Mar Aba I in 544. Through the 1994 Common Christological Declaration between the Chalcedonian Catholic Church and the Nestorian Assyrian Church of the East, the Assyrian Church of the East and the Catholic Church each accepted and confessed the same doctrine of Christology.

== Background ==
In 325, the first ecumenical council (First Council of Nicaea) determined that Jesus Christ was God, "consubstantial" with the Father, and rejected the Arian contention that Jesus was a created being. This was reaffirmed at the First Council of Constantinople (381) and the First Council of Ephesus (431).

=== Eutychian controversy ===
About two years after Cyril of Alexandria's death in 444, an aged monk from Constantinople named Eutyches began teaching a subtle variation on the traditional Christology in an attempt to stop what he saw as a new outbreak of Nestorianism. He claimed to be a faithful follower of Cyril's teaching, which was declared orthodox in the Union of 433.

Cyril had taught that "There is only one physis, since it is the Incarnation, of God the Word." It was argued by Pope Leo I that due to potential ambiguity between the various Greek terms and their Latin equivalents, in addition to the energy and imprudence with which he asserted his opinions, Eutyches was misunderstood, and many believed that he was advocating Docetism, a sort of reversal of Arianism – where Arius had denied the consubstantial divinity of Jesus, Eutyches seemed to be denying that Jesus was fully human. Pope Leo I wrote that Eutyches' error seemed to be more from a lack of skill than from malice.

Eutyches had been accusing various personages of covert Nestorianism. In November 448, Flavian, Bishop of Constantinople held a local synod regarding a point of discipline connected with the province of Sardis. At the end of the session of this synod one of those inculpated, Eusebius, Bishop of Dorylaeum, brought a counter charge of heresy against the archimandrite. Eusebius demanded that Eutyches be removed from office. Flavian preferred that the bishop and the archimandrite sort out their differences, but as his suggestion went unheeded, Eutyches was summoned to clarify his position regarding the nature of Christ. Eventually, Eutyches reluctantly appeared, but his position was considered to be theologically unsophisticated, and the synod finding his answers unresponsive condemned and exiled him. Flavian sent a full account to Pope Leo I. Although it had been accidentally delayed, Leo wrote a compendious explanation of the whole doctrine involved, and sent it to Flavian as a formal and authoritative decision of the question.

Eutyches appealed against the decision, labeling Flavian a Nestorian, and received the support of Pope Dioscorus I of Alexandria. John Anthony McGuckin sees an "innate rivalry" between the Sees of Alexandria and Constantinople. Dioscurus, imitating his predecessors in assuming a primacy over Constantinople, held his own synod which annulled the sentence of Flavian, and absolved Eutyches after he claimed to have repented.

=== Latrocinium of Ephesus ===
Through the influence of the court official Chrysaphius, godson of Eutyches, in 449, the competing claims between the Patriarchs of Constantinople and Alexandria led Emperor Theodosius II to call a council which was held in Ephesus in 449, with Dioscorus presiding.

Pope Leo sent four legates to represent him and expressed his regret that the shortness of the notice must prevent the presence of any other bishop of the West. He provided his legates, one of whom died en route, with a letter addressed to Flavian explaining Rome's position in the controversy. Leo's letter, now known as Leo's Tome, confessed that Christ had two natures, and was not of or from two natures.

On August 8, 449 the Second Council of Ephesus began its first session. The Acts of the first session of this synod were read at the Council of Chalcedon, 451, and are thus preserved. The remainder of the Acts (the first session being wanting) are known through a Syriac translation by a Miaphysite monk, written in the year 535 and published from a manuscript in the British Museum. Nonetheless, there are somewhat different interpretations as to what actually transpired. The question before the council by order of the emperor was whether Flavian, in a synod held by him at Constantinople in November, 448, had justly deposed and excommunicated the Archimandrite Eutyches for refusing to admit two natures in Christ.

Dioscorus began the council by banning all members of the November 448 synod which had deposed Eutyches from sitting as judges. He then introduced Eutyches who publicly professed that while Christ had two natures before the incarnation, the two natures had merged to form a single nature after the incarnation. Of the 130 assembled bishops, 111 voted to rehabilitate Eutyches.

Throughout these proceedings, Hilary (one of the papal legates) repeatedly called for the reading of Leo's Tome, but was ignored. The Eastern Orthodox Church has very different accounts of The Second Council of Ephesus. Pope Dioscorus requested deferring reading of Leo's Tome, as it was not seen as necessary to start with, and could be read later. This was seen as a rebuke to the representatives from the Church of Rome not reading the Tome from the start.

Not having wanted for the letter to be read aloud for this reason, Dioscorus was then forced to depose Flavian of Constantinople and Eusebius of Dorylaeum on the grounds that they taught the Word having two distinct hypostases, in contrast to Cyril's teachings. According to Chalcedonian accounts, when Flavian and Hilary objected, Dioscorus called for a mob to enter the church which assaulted Flavian as he clung to the altar; other accounts blame one monk, Barsauma, and others yet blame Dioscorus himself. Flavian would die three days later. Other sources, however, implicate Empress Pulcheria and Anatolius of Constantinople, as it would not be realistic for a murder witnessed by many bishops and patriarchs at a major council to go unmentioned, and Flavian himself has letters to Leo after the council that make no mention of such events.

The papal legates refused to attend the second session at which several more bishops were deposed, including Ibas of Edessa, Irenaeus of Tyre, Domnus of Antioch, and Theodoret. Dioscorus then had Cyril of Alexandria's Twelve Anathemas declared orthodox with the intent of condemning any confession other than Cyril's one-nature formula.

According to a letter to the Empress Pulcheria collected among the letters of Leo I, Hilary apologized for not delivering to her the pope's letter after the synod, but owing to Dioscurus, who tried to hinder his going either to Rome or to Constantinople, he had great difficulty in making his escape in order to bring to the pontiff the news of the result of the council. Hilary, who later became pope and dedicated an oratory in the Lateran Basilica in thanks for his life, managed to escape from Constantinople and brought news of the council to Leo who immediately dubbed it a "synod of robbers" – Latrocinium – and refused to accept its pronouncements. The decisions of this council now threatened schism between the East and the West.

The claims that bishops being forced to approve actions, were challenged by Pope Dioscorus and the Egyptian Bishops at Chalcedon.

== Convocation and session ==
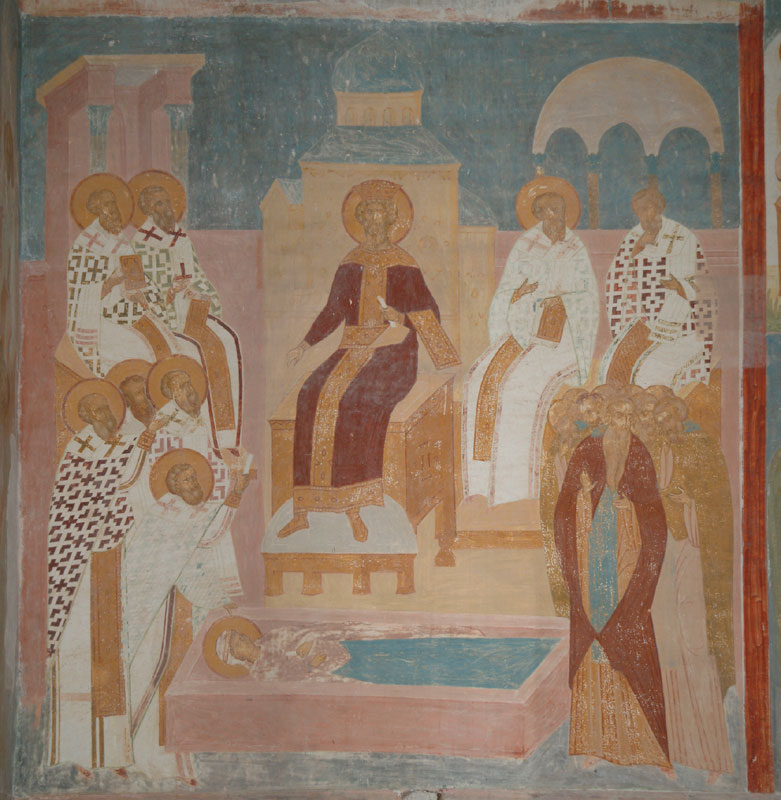
Council of Chalcedon, fresco at Ferapontov Monastery, c. 1502

The situation continued to deteriorate, with Leo demanding the convocation of a new council and Emperor Theodosius II refusing to budge, all the while appointing bishops in agreement with Dioscorus. All this changed dramatically with the Emperor's death and the elevation of Marcian to the imperial throne. To resolve the simmering tensions, Marcian announced his intention to hold a new council to set aside the 449 Second Council of Ephesus which was named the "Latrocinium" or "Robber Council" by Pope Leo. Pulcheria, the sister of Theodosius, may have influenced this decision, or even made the convention of a council a requirement during her negotiations with Aspar, the magister militum, to marry Marcian.

Leo had pressed for it to take place in Italy, but Emperor Marcian instead called for it to convene at Chalcedon because it was closer to Constantinople. This would allow him to respond quickly to any events along the Danube, which was being raided by the Huns under Attila.

The council opened on 8 October 451. Marcian had the bishops deposed by Dioscorus returned to their dioceses and had the body of Flavian brought to the capital to be buried honorably. The Emperor asked Leo to preside over the council, but Leo again chose to send legates in his place. This time, Bishops Paschasinus of Lilybaeum and Julian of Cos and two priests Boniface and Basil represented the western church at the council. The council was attended by about 520 bishops or their representatives and was the largest and best-documented of the first seven ecumenical councils. All the sessions were held in the church of St. Euphemia, Martyr, outside the city and directly opposite Constantinople. As to the number of sessions held by the Council of Chalcedon there is a great discrepancy in the various texts of the Acts, also in the ancient historians of the council. Either the respective manuscripts must have been incomplete; or the historians passed over in silence several sessions held for secondary purposes. According to the deacon Rusticus, there were in all sixteen sessions; this division is commonly accepted by scholars, including Karl Josef von Hefele, historian of the councils. If all the separate meetings were counted, there would be twenty-one sessions; several of these meetings, however, are considered as supplementary to preceding sessions.

Paschasinus refused to give Dioscorus (who had excommunicated Leo leading up to the council) a seat at the council. As a result, he was moved to the nave of the church. Paschasinus further ordered the reinstatement of Theodoret and that he be given a seat, but this move caused such an uproar among the council fathers, that Theodoret also sat in the nave, though he was given a vote in the proceedings, which began with a trial of Dioscorus. Ibas of Edessa, was also declared to be orthodox according to the contents of his letter which were read during the minutes of the Council of Chalcedon.

Marcian wished to bring proceedings to a speedy end, and asked the council to make a pronouncement on the doctrine of the Incarnation before continuing the trial. The council fathers, however, felt that no new creed was necessary, and that the doctrine had been laid out clearly in Leo's Tome. They were also hesitant to write a new creed as the First Council of Ephesus had forbidden the composition or use of any new creed. Aetius, deacon of Constantinople then read Cyril's letter to Nestorius, and a second letter to John of Antioch. The bishops responded, "We all so believe: Pope Leo thus believes ... we all thus believe. As Cyril so believe we, all of us: eternal be the memory of Cyril: as the epistles of Cyril teach such is our mind, such has been our faith: such is our faith: this is the mind of Archbishop Leo, so he believes, so he has written."

Beronician, clerk of the consistory, then read from a book handed him by Aetius, the synodical letter of Leo to Flavian (Leo's Tome). After the reading of the letter, the bishops cried out: "This is the faith of the fathers, this is the faith of the Apostles. So we all believe, thus the orthodox believe. ... Peter has spoken thus through Leo. So taught the Apostles. Piously and truly did Leo teach, so taught Cyril. Everlasting be the memory of Cyril. Leo and Cyril taught the same thing, ... This is the true faith ... This is the faith of the fathers. Why were not these things read at Ephesus?"

However, during the reading of Leo's Tome, three passages were challenged as being potentially Nestorian, and their orthodoxy was defended by using the writings of Cyril. Due to such concerns, the council decided to adjourn and appoint a special committee to investigate the orthodoxy of Leo's Tome, judging it by the standard of Cyril's Twelve Chapters, as some of the bishops present raised concerns about their compatibility. This committee was headed by Anatolius, Patriarch of Constantinople, and was given five days to carefully study the matter. The committee unanimously decided in favor of the orthodoxy of Leo, determining that what he said was compatible with the teaching of Cyril. A number of other bishops also entered statements to the effect that they believed that Leo's Tome was not in contradiction with the teaching of Cyril as well.

The council continued with Dioscorus' trial, but he refused to appear before the assembly. However, historical accounts from the Eastern Orthodox Church note that Dioscorus was put under solitary arrest. As a result, he was condemned, but by an underwhelming amount (more than half the bishops present for the previous sessions did not attend his condemnation), and all of his decrees were declared null. Empress Pulcheria (Marcian's wife) told Dioscorus "In my father's time, there was a man who was stubborn (referring to St. John Chrysostom) and you are aware of what was made of him", to which Dioscorus famously responded "And you may recall that your mother prayed at his tomb, as she was bleeding of sickness". Pulcheria is said to have slapped Dioscorus in the face, breaking some of his teeth, and ordered the guards to confine him, which they did pulling his beard hair. Dioscorus is said to have put these in a box and sent them back to his Church in Alexandria noting "this is the fruit of my faith." Marcian responded by exiling Dioscorus.

All of the bishops were then asked to sign their assent to the Tome, but a group of thirteen Egyptians refused, saying that they would assent to "the traditional faith". As a result, the Emperor's commissioners decided that a credo would indeed be necessary and presented a text to the fathers. No consensus was reached. Paschasinus threatened to return to Rome to reassemble the council in Italy. Marcian agreed, saying that if a clause were not added to the credo, the bishops would have to relocate. The Committee then sat in the oratory of the most holy martyr Euphemis and afterwards reported a definition of faith which while teaching the same doctrine was not the Tome of Leo.

Although it could be reconciled with Cyril's Formula of Reunion, it was not compatible in its wording with Cyril's Twelve Anathemas. In particular, the third anathema reads: "If anyone divides in the one Christ the hypostases after the union, joining them only by a conjunction of dignity or authority or power, and not rather by a coming together in a union by nature, let him be anathema." This appeared to some to be incompatible with Leo's definition of two natures hypostatically joined. However, the council would determine (with the exception of 13 Egyptian bishops) that this was an issue of wording and not of doctrine; a committee of bishops appointed to study the orthodoxy of the Tome using Cyril's letters (which included the twelve anathemas) as their criteria unanimously determined it to be orthodox, and the council, with few exceptions, supported this.

It approved the creed of Nicaea (325), the creed of Constantinople (381; subsequently known as the Nicene Creed), two letters of Cyril against Nestorius, which insisted on the unity of divine and human persons in Christ, and the Tome of Pope Leo I confirming two distinct natures in Christ.

== Acceptance ==
Spectrum of Christological views in late antiquity

The dogmatic definitions of the council are recognized as normative by the Eastern Orthodox and Catholic Churches, as well by certain other Western Churches; also, most Protestants agree that the council's teachings regarding the Trinity and the Incarnation are orthodox doctrine which must be adhered to. The council, however, is rejected by the Oriental Orthodox Churches, the latter teaching rather that "The Lord Jesus Christ is God the Incarnate Word. He possesses the perfect Godhead and the perfect manhood. His fully divine nature is united with His fully human nature yet without mixing, blending or alteration." The Oriental Orthodox contend that this latter teaching has been misunderstood as monophysitism, an appellation with which they strongly disagree but, nevertheless, refuse to accept the decrees of the council.

Many Anglicans and most Protestants consider it to be the last authoritative ecumenical council. These churches, along with Martin Luther, hold that both conscience and scripture preempt doctrinal councils and generally agree that the conclusions of later councils were unsupported by or contradictory to scripture.

=== Results ===
The Council of Chalcedon issued the Chalcedonian Definition, which repudiated the notion of a single nature in Christ, and declared that he has two natures in one person and hypostasis. It also insisted on the completeness of his two natures: Godhead and manhood. The council also issued 27 disciplinary canons governing church administration and authority. In a further decree, later known as canon 28, the bishops declared that the See of Constantinople (New Rome) had the patriarchal status with "equal privileges" (τῶν ἴσων ἀπολαύουσαν in Greek, aequalibus privilegiis in Latin) to the See of Rome. No reference was made in Canon 28 to the bishops of Rome or Constantinople having their authority from being successors to Peter or Andrew respectively. Instead, the stated reasons in the actual text of the Canon that the episcopacy of these cities had been granted their status was the importance of these cities as major cities of the empire of the time. (Note: Canon 28: "[...] For the Fathers rightly granted privileges to the throne of old Rome, because it was the royal city. And the One Hundred and Fifty most religious Bishops, actuated by the same consideration, gave equal privileges to the most holy throne of New Rome, justly judging that the city which is honoured with the Sovereignty and the Senate, and enjoys equal privileges with the old imperial Rome, should in ecclesiastical matters also be magnified as she is, and rank next after her; so that, in the Pontic, the Asian, and the Thracian dioceses, the metropolitans only and such bishops also of the Dioceses aforesaid as are among the barbarians, should be ordained by the aforesaid most holy throne of the most holy Church of Constantinople; every metropolitan of the aforesaid dioceses, together with the bishops of his province, ordaining his own provincial bishops, as has been declared by the divine canons; but that, as has been above said, the metropolitans of the aforesaid Dioceses should be ordained by the archbishop of Constantinople, after the proper elections have been held according to custom and have been reported to him.")

=== Confession of Chalcedon ===
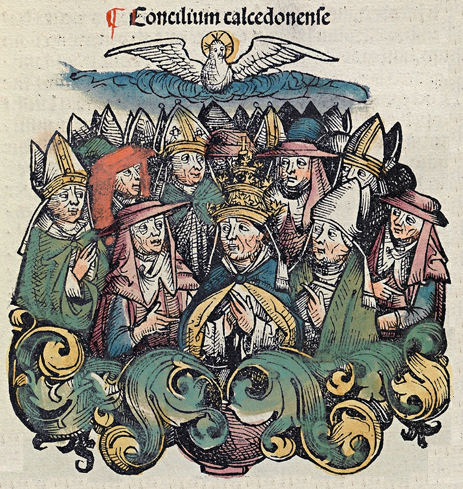
Council of Chalcedon in the Nuremberg Chronicle

The Confession of Chalcedon provides a clear statement on the two natures of Christ, human and divine:

We, then, following the holy Fathers, all with one consent, teach people to confess one and the same Son, our Lord Jesus Christ, the same perfect in Godhead and also perfect in manhood; truly God and truly man, of a reasonable [rational] soul and body; consubstantial [co-essential] with the Father according to the Godhead, and consubstantial with us according to the Manhood; in all things like unto us, without sin; begotten before all ages of the Father according to the Godhead, and in these latter days, for us and for our salvation, born of the Virgin Mary, the Mother of God, according to the Manhood; one and the same Christ, Son, Lord, only begotten, to be acknowledged in two natures, inconfusedly, unchangeably, indivisibly, inseparably; (ἐν δύο φύσεσιν ἀσυγχύτως, ἀτρέπτως, ἀδιαιρέτως, ἀχωρίστως – in duabus naturis inconfuse, immutabiliter, indivise, inseparabiliter) the distinction of natures being by no means taken away by the union, but rather the property of each nature being preserved, and concurring in one Person (prosopon) and one Subsistence (hypostasis), not parted or divided into two persons, but one and the same Son, and only begotten God (μονογενῆ Θεόν), the Word, the Lord Jesus Christ; as the prophets from the beginning [have declared] concerning Him, and the Lord Jesus Christ Himself has taught us, and the Creed of the holy Fathers has handed down to us.

The full text of the definition reaffirms the decisions of the Council of Ephesus and the pre-eminence of the Creed of Nicea (325). (Note: Further definitions of the Council of Constantinople (381) can be found on Wikisource.) It also canonises as authoritative two of Cyril of Alexandria's letters and the Tome of Leo written against Eutyches and sent to Archbishop Flavian of Constantinople in 449.

=== Canons ===
The work of the council was completed by a series of 30 disciplinary canons, the Ancient Epitomes of which are:

1. The canons of every Synod of the holy Fathers shall be observed.
2. Whoso buys or sells an ordination, down to a Prosmonarius, shall be in danger of losing his grade. Such shall also be the case with go-betweens, if they be clerics they shall be cut off from their rank, if laymen or monks, they shall be anathematized.
3. Those who assume the care of secular houses should be corrected, unless perchance the law called them to the administration of those not yet come of age, from which there is no exemption. Unless further their Bishop permits them to take care of orphans and widows.
4. Domestic oratories and monasteries are not to be erected contrary to the judgment of the bishop. Every monk must be subject to his bishop, and must not leave his house except at his suggestion. A slave, however, can not enter the monastic life without the consent of his master.
5. Those who go from city to city shall be subject to the canon law on the subject.
6. In Martyries and Monasteries ordinations are strictly forbidden. Should any one be ordained therein, his ordination shall be reputed of no effect.
7. If any cleric or monk arrogantly affects the military or any other dignity, let him be cursed.
8. Any clergyman in an almshouse or monastery must submit himself to the authority of the bishop of the city. But he who rebels against this let him pay the penalty.
9. Litigious clerics shall be punished according to canon, if they despise the episcopal and resort to the secular tribunal. When a cleric has a contention with a bishop let him wait till the synod sits, and if a bishop have a contention with his metropolitan let him carry the case to Constantinople.
10. No cleric shall be recorded on the clergy-list of the churches of two cities. But if he shall have strayed forth, let him be returned to his former place. But if he has been transferred, let him have no share in the affairs of his former church.
11. Let the poor who stand in need of help make their journey with letters pacificatory and not commendatory: for letters commendatory should only be given to those who are open to suspicion.
12. One province shall not be cut into two. Whoever shall do this shall be cast out of the episcopate. Such cities as are cut off by imperial rescript shall enjoy only the honour of having a bishop settled in them: but all the rights pertaining to the true metropolis shall be preserved.
13. No cleric shall be received to communion in another city without a letter commendatory.
14. A Cantor or Lector alien to the sound faith, if being then married, he shall have begotten children let him bring them to communion, if they had there been baptized. But if they had not yet been baptized they shall not be baptized afterwards by the heretics.
15. No person shall be ordained deaconess except she be forty years of age. If she shall dishonour her ministry by contracting a marriage, let her be anathema.
16. Monks or nuns shall not contract marriage, and if they do so let them be excommunicated.
17. Village and rural parishes if they have been possessed for thirty years, they shall so continue. But if within that time, the matter shall be subject to adjudication. But if by the command of the Emperor a city be renewed, the order of ecclesiastical parishes shall follow the civil and public forms.
18. Clerics and Monks, if they shall have dared to hold conventicles and to conspire against the bishop, shall be cast out of their rank.
19. Twice each year the Synod shall be held wherever the bishop of the Metropolis shall designate, and all matters of pressing interest shall be determined.
20. A clergyman of one city shall not be given a cure in another. But if he has been driven from his native place and shall go into another he shall be without blame. If any bishop receives clergymen from without his diocese he shall be excommunicated as well as the cleric he receives.
21. A cleric or layman making charges rashly against his bishop shall not be received.
22. Whoever seizes the goods of his deceased bishop shall be cast forth from his rank.
23. Clerics or monks who spend much time at Constantinople contrary to the will of their bishop, and stir up seditions, shall be cast out of the city.
24. A monastery erected with the consent of the bishop shall be immovable. And whatever pertains to it shall not be alienated. Whoever shall take upon him to do otherwise, shall not be held guiltless.
25. Let the ordination of bishops be within three months: necessity however may make the time longer. But if anyone shall ordain counter to this decree, he shall be liable to punishment. The revenue shall remain with the œconomus.
26. The œconomus in all churches must be chosen from the clergy. And the bishop who neglects to do this is not without blame.
27. If a clergyman elope with a woman, let him be expelled from the Church. If a layman, let him be anathema. The same shall be the lot of any that assist him.
28. The bishop of New Rome (Constantinople) shall enjoy the same privileges as the bishop of Old Rome, on account of the removal of the Empire. For this reason the [metropolitans] of Pontus, of Asia, and of Thrace, as well as the Barbarian bishops shall be ordained by the bishop of Constantinople.
29. He is sacrilegious who degrades a bishop to the rank of a presbyter. For he that is guilty of crime is unworthy of the priesthood. But he that was deposed without cause, let him be [still] bishop.
30. It is the custom of the Egyptians that none subscribe without the permission of their archbishop. Wherefore they are not to be blamed who did not subscribe the Epistle of the holy Leo until an archbishop had been appointed for them.

Canon 28 grants equal privileges (isa presbeia) to Constantinople as of Rome because Constantinople is the New Rome as renewed by canon 36 of the Quinisext Council. Pope Leo declared the canon 28 null and void and only approved the canons of the council which were pertaining to faith. Initially, the council indicated their understanding that Pope Leo's ratification was necessary for the canon to be binding, writing, "we have made still another enactment which we have deemed necessary for the maintenance of good order and discipline, and we are persuaded that your Holiness will approve and confirm our decree. ... We are confident you will shed upon the Church of Constantinople a ray of that Apostolic splendor which you possess, for you have ever cherished this church, and you are not at all niggardly in imparting your riches to your children. ... Vouchsafe then, most Holy and most Blessed Father, to accept what we have done in your name, and in a friendly spirit (hos oikeia te kai phila). For your legates have made a violent stand against it, desiring, no doubt, that this good deed should proceed, in the first instance, from your provident hand. But we, wishing to gratify the pious Christian emperors, and the illustrious Senate, and the capital of the empire, have judged that an Ecumenical Council was the fittest occasion for effecting this measure. Hence we have made bold to confirm the privileges of the aforementioned city (tharresantes ekurosamen) as if your holiness had taken the initiative, for we know how tenderly you love your children, and we feel that in honoring the child we have honored its parent. ... We have informed you of everything with a view of proving our sincerity, and of obtaining for our labors your confirmation and consent." Following Leo's rejection of the canon, Bishop Anatolius of Constantinople conceded, "Even so, the whole force of confirmation of the acts was reserved for the authority of Your Blessedness. Therefore, let Your Holiness know for certain that I did nothing to further the matter, knowing always that I held myself bound to avoid the lusts of pride and covetousness." However, the Canon has since been viewed as valid by the Eastern Orthodox Church.

According to some ancient Greek collections, canons 29 and 30 are attributed to the council: canon 29, which states that an unworthy bishop cannot be demoted but can be removed, is an extract from the minutes of the 19th session; canon 30, which grants the Egyptians time to consider their rejection of Leo's Tome, is an extract from the minutes of the fourth session.

In all likelihood an official record of the proceedings was made either during the council itself or shortly afterwards. The assembled bishops informed the pope that a copy of all the "Acta" would be transmitted to him; in March 453, Pope Leo commissioned Julian of Cos, then at Constantinople, to make a collection of all the Acts and translate them into Latin. Most of the documents, chiefly the minutes of the sessions, were written in Greek; others, e.g. the imperial letters, were issued in both languages; others, again, e.g. the papal letters, were written in Latin. Eventually nearly all of them were translated into both languages.

== The status of the sees of Constantinople and Jerusalem ==
=== The status of Jerusalem ===
The metropolitan of Jerusalem was given independence from the metropolitan of Antioch and from any other higher-ranking bishop, given what is now known as autocephaly, in the council's seventh session whose "Decree on the Jurisdiction of Jerusalem and Antioch" contains: "the bishop of Jerusalem, or rather the most holy Church which is under him, shall have under his own power the three Palestines". This led to Jerusalem becoming a patriarchate, one of the five patriarchates known as the pentarchy, when the title of patriarch was created in 531 by Justinian. The Oxford Dictionary of the Christian Church, s.v. patriarch (ecclesiastical), also calls it "a title dating from the 6th century, for the bishops of the five great sees of Christendom". Merriam-Webster's Encyclopedia of World Religions, says: "Five patriarchates, collectively called the pentarchy, were the first to be recognized by the legislation of the emperor Justinian (reigned 527–565)".

=== The status of Constantinople ===
In a canon of disputed validity, the Council of Chalcedon also elevated the See of Constantinople to a position "second in eminence and power to the Bishop of Rome".

The Council of Nicaea in 325 had noted that the Sees of Rome, Alexandria and Antioch should have primacy over other, lesser dioceses. At the time, the See of Constantinople was not yet of ecclesiastical prominence, but its proximity to the Imperial court gave rise to its importance. The Council of Constantinople in 381 modified the situation somewhat by placing Constantinople second in honor, above Alexandria and Antioch, stating in Canon III, that "the bishop of Constantinople ... shall have the prerogative of honor after the bishop of Rome; because Constantinople is New Rome". In the early 5th century, this status was challenged by the bishops of Alexandria, but the Council of Chalcedon confirmed in Canon XXVIII:

For the Fathers rightly granted privileges to the throne of old Rome, because it was the royal city. And the One Hundred and Fifty most religious Bishops, actuated by the same consideration, gave equal privileges (ἴσα πρεσβεῖα) to the most holy throne of New Rome, justly judging that the city which is honoured with the Sovereignty and the Senate and enjoys equal privileges with the old imperial Rome, should in ecclesiastical matters also be magnified as she is, and rank next after her.

In making their case, the council fathers argued that tradition had accorded "honor" to the see of older Rome because it was the first imperial city. Accordingly, "moved by the same purposes" the fathers "apportioned equal prerogatives to the most holy see of new Rome" because "the city which is honored by the imperial power and senate and enjoying privileges equaling older imperial Rome should also be elevated to her level in ecclesiastical affairs and take second place after her". The framework for allocating ecclesiastical authority advocated by the council fathers mirrored the allocation of imperial authority in the later period of the Roman Empire. The Eastern position could be characterized as being political in nature, as opposed to a doctrinal view. In practice, all Christians East and West addressed the papacy as the See of Peter and Paul or the Apostolic See rather than the See of the Imperial Capital. Rome understands this to indicate that its precedence has always come from its direct lineage from the apostles Peter and Paul rather than its association with Imperial authority.

After the passage of the Canon 28, Rome filed a protest against the reduction of honor given to Antioch and Alexandria. However, fearing that withholding Rome's approval would be interpreted as a rejection of the entire council, in 453 the pope confirmed the council's canons while declaring the 28th null and void. This position would change and later be accepted in 1215 at the Fourth Council of the Lateran.

== Consequences: Chalcedonian Schism ==
The near-immediate result of the council was a major schism. The bishops who were uneasy with the language of Pope Leo's Tome repudiated the council, saying that the acceptance of two physes was tantamount to Nestorianism. Dioscorus of Alexandria advocated miaphysitism and had dominated the Council of Ephesus. A schism occurred, whereby the churches that rejected Chalcedon in favor of Ephesus and the rest of the Church broke off from each other, the most significant among the former being the Sees of Alexandria and Antioch. The rise of the "so-called" monophysitism in the East (as branded by the West) was incorrectly believed to be led by the Copts of Egypt. This must be regarded as the outward expression of the growing nationalist trends in that province against the gradual intensification of Byzantine imperialism, soon to reach its consummation during the reign of Emperor Justinian.

In Egypt, the Church of Alexandria splintered, as 30,000 Greeks of Chalcedonian persuasion led by Proterius were ranged against some five million Coptic non-Chalcedonian followers of Dioscorus led by Timothy II. Similarly, the Church of Antioch was divided among the local Greeks of Chalcedonian persuasion led by Paul and the Syriac non-Chalcedonian followers of Severus led by Sergius. A significant effect on the Orthodox Christians in Egypt was a series of persecutions by the Roman (later, Byzantine) empire forcing followers of the Oriental Orthodox Churches to claim allegiance to Leo's Tome, or Chalcedon. This led to the martyrdom, persecution and death of thousands of Egyptian saints and bishops till the Arab Conquest of Egypt. As a result, The Council of Chalcedon is referred to as "Chalcedon, the Ominous" among Coptic Egyptians given how it led to Christians persecuting other Christians for the first time in history. Coptic Orthodox Christians continue to distinguish themselves from followers of Chalcedon to this day. Although the theological differences are seen as limited (if non-existent), it is politics, the subsequent persecutions, and the power struggles in the Roman Empire that may have led to this schism, or at least contributed significantly to amplifying it through the centuries.

The divisions in the Church weakened the Byzantine Empire's eastern provinces and helped ease the subsequent Sassanian and Arab invasions.

Justinian I attempted to bring those monks who still rejected the decision of the Council of Chalcedon into communion with the Chalcedonian church. The exact time of this event is unknown, but it is believed to have been between 535 and 548. Abraham of Farshut was summoned to Constantinople and chose to bring with him four monks. Upon arrival, Justinian summoned them and informed them that they could either accept the decision of the council or lose their positions. Abraham refused to entertain the idea. Theodora tried to persuade Justinian to change his mind, seemingly to no avail. Abraham himself stated in a letter to his monks that he preferred to remain in exile rather than subscribe to a faith contrary to that of Athanasius. They were not alone, and the non-Chalcedon churches compose Oriental Orthodoxy, with the Patriarch of Alexandria as their primus inter pares. Only in recent years has a degree of rapprochement between Chalcedonian Christians and the Oriental Orthodox been seen.

== Oriental Orthodox view ==
Plenty of Oriental Orthodox theologians, saints and modern clergy have affirmed that a real difference in the confessions of faith has taken place. Modern Coptic Orthodox Christians profess to be Miaphysites. This is reflected in the daily liturgical prayer: "Christ's divinity parted not from His humanity, not for a single moment nor a twinkling of an eye".

== Liturgical commemorations ==
The Eastern Orthodox Church commemorates the "Holy Fathers of the 4th Ecumenical Council, who assembled in Chalcedon" on the Sunday on or after July 13; however, in some places (e.g., Russia) on that date is rather a feast of the Fathers of the First Six Ecumenical Councils.

For both of the above complete propers have been composed and are found in the Menaion.

For the former "The Office of the 630 Holy and God-bearing Fathers of the 4th ... Summoned against the Monophysites Eftyches and Dioskoros" (despite the latter being miaphysite and not monophysite) was composed in the middle of the 14th century by Patriarch Philotheus I of Constantinople. This contains numerous hymns exposing the council's teaching, commemorating its leaders whom it praises and whose prayers it implores, and naming its opponents pejoratively, e.g., "Come let us clearly reject the errors of ... but praise in divine songs the fourth council of pious fathers."

For the latter the propers are titled "We Commemorate Six Holy Ecumenical Councils". This repeatedly damns those anathematized by the councils with such rhetoric as "Christ-smashing deception enslaved Nestorius" and "mindless Arius and ... is tormented in the fires of Gehenna" while the fathers of the councils are praised and the dogmas of the councils are expounded in the hymns therein.

== See also ==
- Pamphilus the Theologian

== Bibliography ==
- Edward Walford, translator, The Ecclesiastical History of Evagrius: A History of the Church from AD 431 to AD 594, 1846. Reprinted 2008. Evolution Publishing, ISBN 978-1-889758-88-6. The Christian Roman Empire series
- Bindley, T. Herbert and F. W. Green, The Oecumenical Documents of the Faith. 2nd ed. London: Methuen, 1950.
- Bury, John B. (1889). A history of the later Roman empire from Arcadius to Irene. Vol. 2.
- Edwards, Mark J. (2009). Catholicity and Heresy in the Early Church. Farnham: Ashgate. ISBN 9780754662914.
- Grillmeier, Aloys (1975) [1965]. Christ in Christian Tradition: From the Apostolic Age to Chalcedon (451) (2nd revised ed.). Louisville: Westminster John Knox Press. ISBN 9780664223014.
- Gwynn, David M. (2009). "The Council of Chalcedon and the Definition of Christian Tradition". Chalcedon in Context: Church Councils 400–700. Liverpool: Liverpool University Press. pp. 7–26. ISBN 9781846316487.
- Hefele, Charles Joseph. A History of the Councils of the Church from the Original Documents. 5 vols. Edinburgh: T & T Clark, 1883. (Our topic is located in vol. 3)
- Kelly, John N. D. (2006) [1972]. Early Christian Creeds (3rd ed.). London-New York: Continuum. ISBN 9780826492166.
- Louth, Andrew (2009). "Why Did the Syrians reject the Council of Chalcedon?". Chalcedon in Context: Church Councils 400–700. Liverpool: Liverpool University Press. pp. 107–116. ISBN 9781846316487.
- Meyendorff, John (1966). Orthodoxy and Catholicity. New York: Sheed & Ward.
- Meyendorff, John, Christ in Eastern Christian Thought (Washington D.C.: Corpus Books, 1969).
- Meyendorff, John (1989). Imperial unity and Christian divisions: The Church 450–680 A.D. Crestwood, NY: St. Vladimir's Seminary Press. ISBN 978-0-88-141056-3.
- Price, Richard; Gaddis, Michael, eds. (2005a). The Acts of the Council of Chalcedon. Vol. 1. Liverpool: Liverpool University Press. ISBN 9780853230397.
- Price, Richard; Gaddis, Michael, eds. (2005b). The Acts of the Council of Chalcedon. Vol. 2. Liverpool: Liverpool University Press. ISBN 9780853230397.
- Price, Richard; Gaddis, Michael, eds. (2005c). The Acts of the Council of Chalcedon. Vol. 3. Liverpool: Liverpool University Press.
- Price, Richard (2009a). "The Council of Chalcedon (451): A Narrative". Chalcedon in Context: Church Councils 400–700. Liverpool: Liverpool University Press. pp. 70–91. ISBN 9781846316487.
- Price, Richard (2009b). "Truth, Omission, and Fiction in the Acts of Chalcedon". Chalcedon in Context: Church Councils 400–700. Liverpool: Liverpool University Press. pp. 92–106. ISBN 9781846316487.
- Roueché, Charlotte (2009). "Acclamations at the Council of Chalcedon". Chalcedon in Context: Church Councils 400–700. Liverpool: Liverpool University Press. pp. 169–177. ISBN 9781846316487.
- Sellers, R.V., Two Ancient Christologies (London: SPCK, 1940)
- Sellers, R.V., The Council of Chalcedon: A Historical and Doctrinal Survey, (London, SPCK, 1953).
- Whitby, Michael (2009). "An Unholy Crew? Bishops Behaving Badly at Church Councils". Chalcedon in Context: Church Councils 400–700. Liverpool: Liverpool University Press. pp. 178–196. ISBN 9781846316487.
