= Liberatus of Carthage =

Liberatus of Carthage (fl. 6th century) was an archdeacon and the author of an important history of the Nestorian and Monophysite controversies in the 5th- and 6th-century Christian Church.

== Life ==
In 535 he was sent to Rome, as legate of a great African national synod of two hundred and seventeen bishops, to consult Pope Agapetus I (535-6) about a number of questions (Harduin, II, 1154; Mansi, VIII, 808). Like most north Africans he was vehemently opposed to Justinian's edict against the "Three Chapters" (544). He was frequently employed by the African bishops as their ambassador in the disputes that arose from that question. "Tired with the fatigue of traveling, and resting the mind a little from temporal cares" (according to the introduction to his book), he used his leisure to compose a summary history of the two great heresies of the preceding century. His object in writing it was avowedly to show how misjudged the emperor's condemnation of the Three Chapters was. The work is called Breviarium causae Nestorianorum et Eutychianorum ("A Short Account of the Affair of the Nestorians and Eutychians"), most often simply the Breviarium of Liberatus.

The Breviarium begins with the ordination of Nestorius (428) and ends with the Fifth Ecumenical Council. From the fact that the author mentions Patriarch Theodosius I of Alexandria as being still alive, it is evident that it was written before 567, the year that Theodosius died. On the other hand, Liberatus records the death of Pope Vigilius (June 555). His authorities are the Historia tripartita of Cassiodorus, acts of synods, and letters of contemporary Fathers. In spite of Liberatus's controversial purpose and his indignation against Monophysites and all of those involved in the condemnation of the Three Chapters, his short history is well and fairly written. It forms an important document for the history of these movements.
