= Latrocinium =

Subversive or unjust action in Roman law

Latrocinium (from Latin latro, "bandit", ultimately from Greek latron, "pay" or "hire") was a war not preceded by a formal declaration of war as understood in Roman law; thus guerrilla warfare conducted against Rome was a form of latrocinium. It is typically translated into English as "banditry" or "brigandage", but in antiquity encompassed a wider range of subversive or anti-authoritarian actions, especially slave rebellions organized under charismatic leaders. In designating acts of violence that have ideological motives instead of or in addition to material gain, the modern distinction between terrorism and war may be a more illuminating comparison for the 21st century. The Greek term was leisteia; Plato and Aristotle regarded banditry as a way of life, like fishing or hunting.

== Ecclesiastical councils as latrocinia ==
In ecclesiastical Latin, latrocinium is a term of abuse for ecumenical councils regarded as renegade or subversive of canon law, especially the second Council of Ephesus – dubbed the "Robber Council". (Latrocinium Ephesinum) in 449. The Third Council of Sirmium in 357, the Council of Hieria in 754, and the Synod of Pistoia in 1786, were also each described by their opponents as a latrocinium. Some also regarded the fourth Council of Constantinople (879–880) as a latrocinium.

== Medieval usage ==
In the Middle Ages, latrocinium was a war without just cause, or piracy.

== See also ==
- Bagaudae
