= First seven ecumenical councils =

Early Christian governance councils

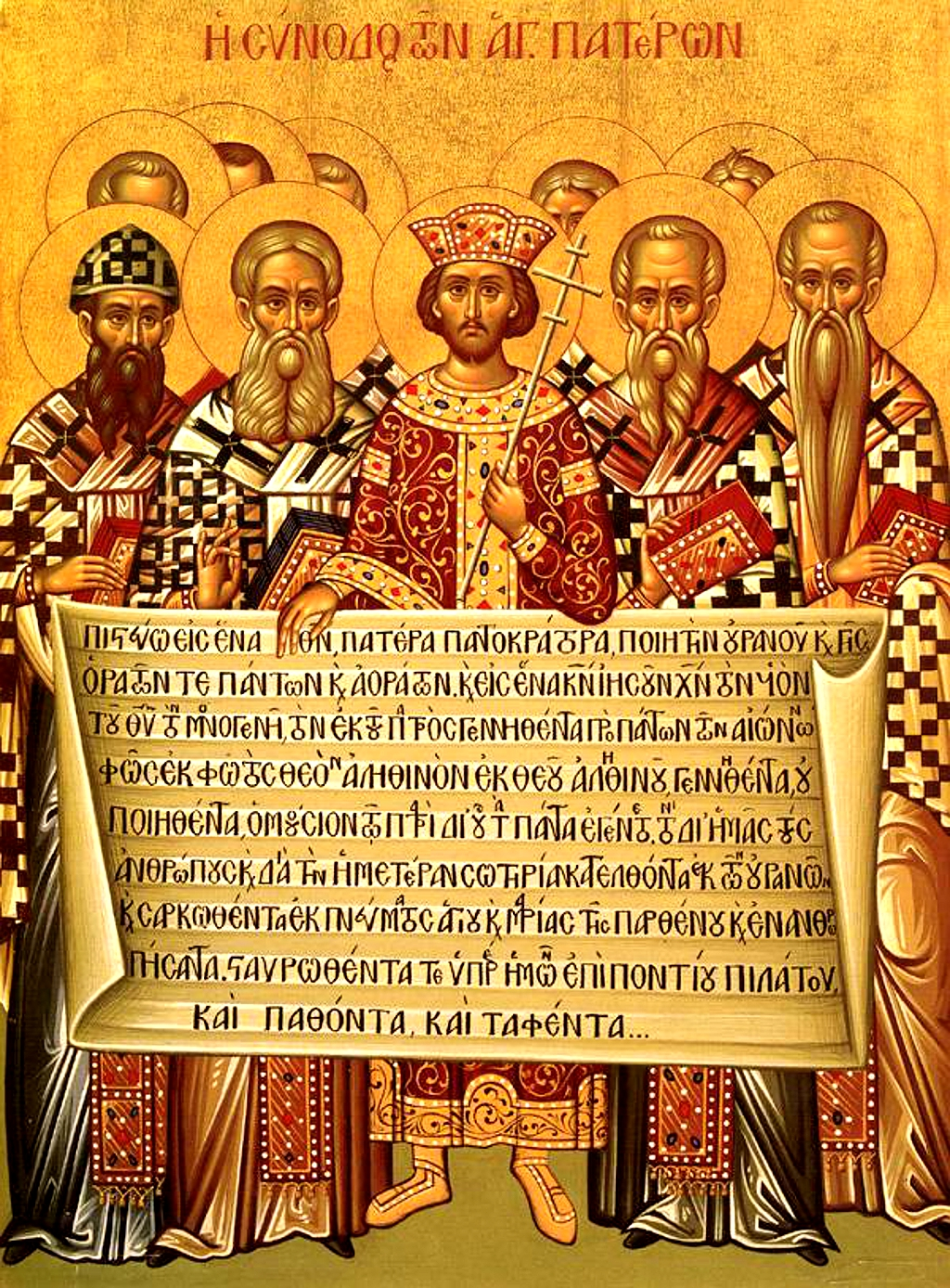
Icon depicting the Emperor Constantine (centre), accompanied by the bishops of the First Council of Nicaea (325), holding the Niceno–Constantinopolitan Creed of 381

In the history of Christianity, the first seven ecumenical councils are as follows: the First Council of Nicaea in 325, the First Council of Constantinople in 381, the Council of Ephesus in 431, the Council of Chalcedon in 451, the Second Council of Constantinople in 553, the Third Council of Constantinople from 680 to 681 and finally, the Second Council of Nicaea in 787.

These seven events represented an attempt by Church leaders to reach an orthodox consensus, restore peace and develop a unified Christendom. Among Eastern Christians the Eastern Orthodox, Oriental Orthodox, and Church of the East (Assyrian) churches and among Western Christians the Roman Catholic, Anglican, Utrecht and Polish National Old Catholic, and some Scandinavian Lutheran churches all trace the legitimacy of their clergy by apostolic succession back to this period and beyond, to the earlier period referred to as the Early Church.

This era begins with the First Council of Nicaea in AD 325, convened by the emperor Constantine I following his victory over Licinius and consolidation of his reign over the Roman Empire. Nicaea I enunciated the Nicene Creed that in its original form and as modified by the First Council of Constantinople of 381 was seen by all later councils as the touchstone of orthodoxy on the doctrine of the Trinity.

The Eastern Orthodox and Roman Catholic Churches accept all seven of these councils as legitimate ecumenical councils. The Non-Chalcedonian Oriental Orthodox Churches accept only the first three, while the Non-Ephesian Church of the East accepts only the first two. There is also one additional council, the so-called Quinisext Council of Trullo held in AD 692 between the sixth and seventh ecumenical councils, which issued organizational, liturgical and canonical rules but did not discuss theology. Only within Eastern Orthodoxy is its authority commonly considered ecumenical; however, the Orthodox do not number it among the seven general councils, but rather count it as a continuation of the fifth and sixth. The Roman Catholic Church does not accept the Quinisext Council, but both the Roman magisterium as well as a minority of Eastern Orthodox hierarchs and theological writers consider there to have been further ecumenical councils after the first seven (see the Fourth Council of Constantinople, Fifth Council of Constantinople, and twelve additional post-schism ecumenical councils canonical for Catholics).

== The councils ==
These seven ecumenical councils are:

Council	Date	Convoked by	Location	President	Attendance (approx.)	Main topics
First Council of Nicaea	20 May – 19 June 325	Emperor Constantine I	Imperial Palace of Nicaea; 40°25′38.8″N 29°42′42.4″E	Hosius of Corduba (and Emperor Constantine)	318	Arianism, the nature of Christ, celebration of Passover (Easter), ordination of eunuchs, prohibition of kneeling on Sundays and from Easter to Pentecost, validity of baptism by heretics, lapsed Christians, sundry other matters.
First Council of Constantinople	May–July 381	Emperor Theodosius I	Hagia Irene; 37°56′41.78″N 27°20′21.1″E	Timothy of Alexandria, Meletius of Antioch, Gregory Nazianzus, and Nectarius of Constantinople	150	Arianism, Apollinarism, Sabellianism, Holy Spirit, successor to Meletius
Council of Ephesus	22 June – 31 July 431	Emperor Theodosius II	Church of Mary; 37°56′41.78″N 27°20′21.13″E	Cyril of Alexandria, Acacius of Melitene, Theodotus of Ancyra	200–250	Nestorianism, Theotokos, Pelagianism
Council of Chalcedon	8 October – 1 November 451	Emperor Marcian	Church of Saint Euphemia; 40°59′26.4″N 29°01′29.8″E	Papal Legates of Pope Leo I: Paschasinus of Lilybaeum, Lucentius of Asculanum, Julian of Cos, and the presbyter Boniface. (Formal presidency)	520	The judgments issued at the Second Council of Ephesus in 449, the alleged offences of Bishop Dioscorus of Alexandria, the relationship between the divinity and humanity of Christ, many disputes involving particular bishops and sees.
Second Council of Constantinople	5 May – 2 June 553	Emperor Justinian I	Hagia Sophia; 41°0′30.0″N 28°58′48.0″E	Eutychius of Constantinople	152	Nestorianism, Monophysitism, Origenism
Third Council of Constantinople	7 November 680 – 16 September 681	Emperor Constantine IV	Great Palace of Constantinople; 41°0′20.8″N 28°58′37.5″E	Patriarch George I of Constantinople	300	Monothelitism, the human and divine wills of Jesus
Second Council of Nicaea	24 September – 23 October 787	Constantine VI and Empress Irene (as regent)	Hagia Sophia; 40°25′45.0″N 29°43′11.8″E	Patriarch Tarasios of Constantinople, legates of Pope Adrian I	350	Iconoclasm

=== First Council of Nicaea (325) ===
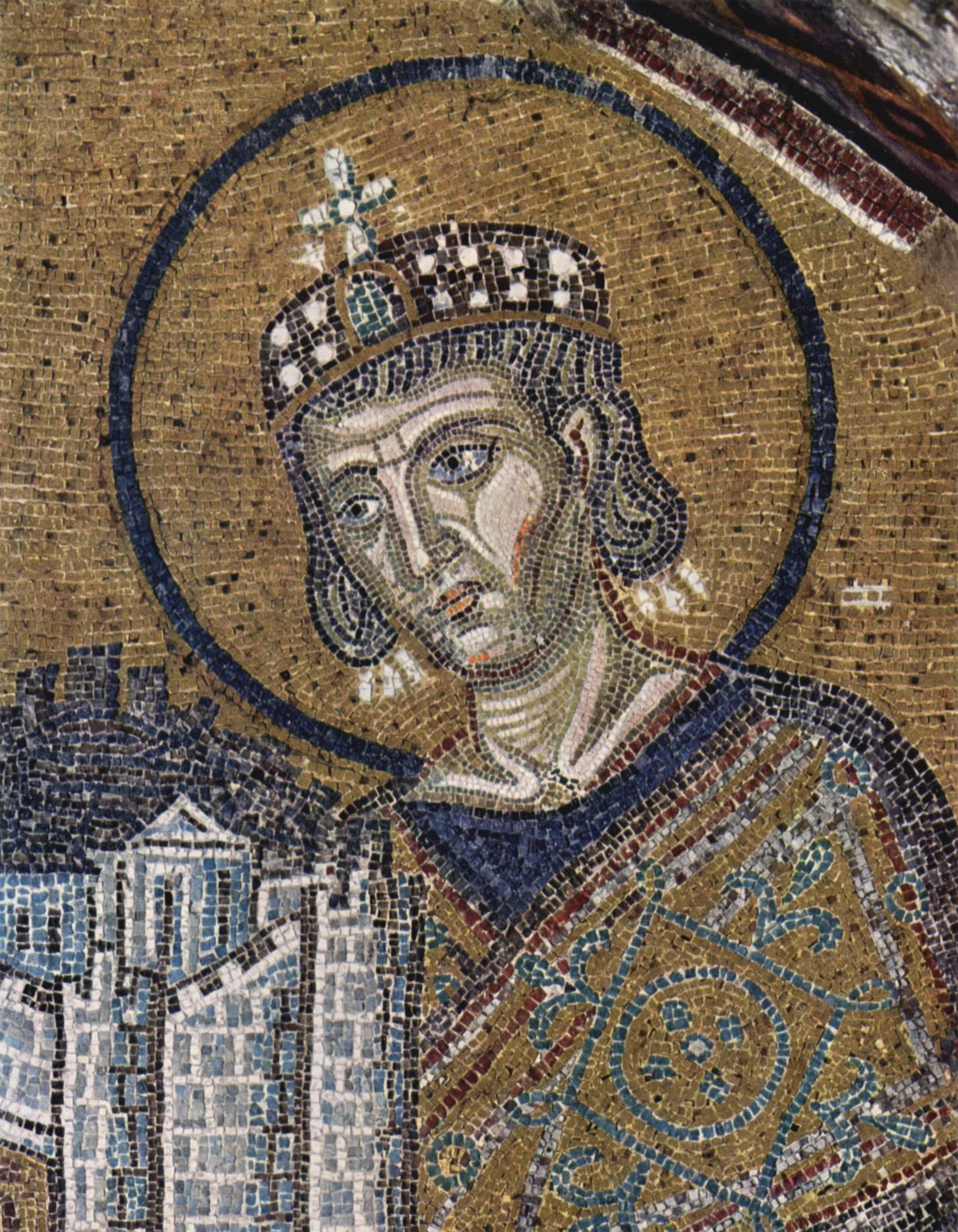
Emperor Constantine presents a representation of the city of Constantinople as tribute to an enthroned Mary and baby Jesus in this church mosaic. Hagia Sophia, c. 1000).

Emperor Constantine convened this council to settle a controversial issue, the relation between Jesus Christ and God the Father. The Emperor wanted to establish universal agreement on it. Representatives came from across the Empire, subsidized by the Emperor. Previous to this council, the bishops would hold local councils, such as the Council of Jerusalem, but there had been no universal, or ecumenical, council.

The council drew up a creed, the original Nicene Creed, which received nearly unanimous support. The council's description of "God's only-begotten Son", Jesus Christ, as of the same substance with God the Father became a touchstone of Christian Trinitarianism. The council also addressed the issue of dating Easter (see Quartodecimanism and Easter controversy), recognised the right of the See of Alexandria to jurisdiction outside of its own province (by analogy with the jurisdiction exercised by Rome) and the prerogatives of the churches in Antioch and the other provinces and approved the custom by which Jerusalem was honoured, but without the metropolitan dignity.

The Council was opposed by the Arians, and Constantine tried to reconcile Arius, after whom Arianism is named, with the Church. Even when Arius died in 336, one year before the death of Constantine, the controversy continued, with various separate groups espousing Arian sympathies in one way or another. In 359, a double council of Eastern and Western bishops affirmed a formula stating that the Father and the Son were similar in accord with the scriptures, the crowning victory for Arianism. The opponents of Arianism rallied, and the First Council of Constantinople in 381 marked the final victory of Nicene orthodoxy within the Empire, though Arianism had by then spread to the Germanic tribes, among whom it gradually disappeared after the conversion of the Franks to Christianity in 496.

==== Constantine commissions Bibles ====
In 331, Constantine I commissioned Eusebius to deliver fifty Bibles for the Church of Constantinople. Athanasius (Apol. Const. 4) recorded Alexandrian scribes around 340 preparing Bibles for Constans. Little else is known, though there is plenty of speculation. For example, it is speculated that this may have provided motivation for canon lists, and that Codex Vaticanus and Codex Sinaiticus are examples of these Bibles. Together with the Peshitta and Codex Alexandrinus, these are the earliest extant Christian Bibles.

=== First Council of Constantinople (381) ===
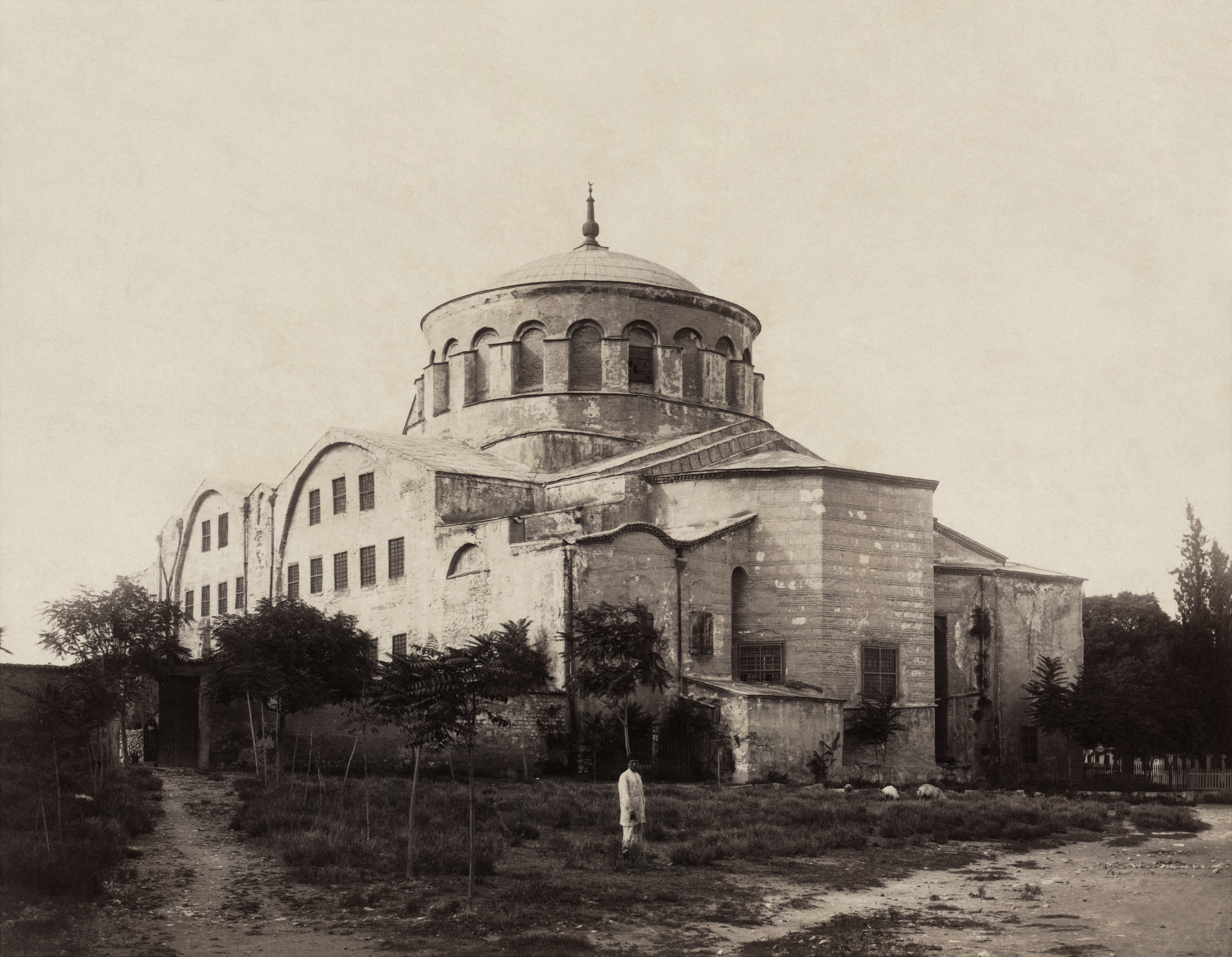
Hagia Irene is a former church, now a museum, in Istanbul. Commissioned in the 4th century, it ranks as the first church built in Constantinople, and has its original atrium. In 381 the First Council of Constantinople took place in the church. Damaged by an earthquake in the 8th century, its present form largely dates from repairs made at that time.

The council approved the current form of the Nicene Creed used in most Oriental Orthodox churches. The Eastern Orthodox Church uses the council's text but with the verbs expressing belief in the singular: Πιστεύω (I believe) instead of Πιστεύομεν (We believe). The Catholic Church's Latin Church and its liturgies also use the singular and, except in Greek, adds two phrases, Deum de Deo (God from God) and Filioque (and the Son). The form used by the Armenian Apostolic Church, which is part of Oriental Orthodoxy, has many more additions. This fuller creed may have existed before the Council and probably originated from the baptismal creed of Constantinople.

The council also condemned Apollinarism, the teaching that there was no human mind or soul in Christ. It also granted Constantinople honorary precedence over all churches save Rome.

The council did not include Western bishops or Roman legates, but it was later accepted as ecumenical in the West.

=== First Council of Ephesus (431) ===
Theodosius II called the council to settle the Christological controversy surrounding Nestorianism. Nestorius, Patriarch of Constantinople, declared the use of the term Theotokos (Greek: Ἡ Θεοτόκος, "God-Bearer") to be insufficient, preferring to use Christokos. This term had been in use by the early church prior to the outbreak of this controversy. Nestorius affirmed that Christ is in two distinct, separate natures (hypostases) that persist after the union, in contrast to Cyril of Alexandria, who insisted on the unity of the two natures into one.

The council deposed Nestorius, repudiated Nestorianism, and proclaimed the Virgin Mary as the Theotokos.

After quoting the Nicene Creed in its original form, as at the First Council of Nicaea, without the alterations and additions made at the First Council of Constantinople, it declared it "unlawful for any man to bring forward, or to write, or to compose a different (ἑτέραν) Faith as a rival to that established by the holy Fathers assembled with the Holy Ghost in Nicæa."

==== Aftermath ====
Shortly after Cyril's death, in November 448, a synod at Constantinople condemned Eutyches, an archimandrite (abbot) of a significant monastery near Constantinople, who taught that Christ was not consubstantial with humanity as He had one divine nature that "consumed his humanity as the ocean consumes a drop of vinegar."

In 449, Theodosius II summoned a council at Ephesus, where Eutyches was exonerated and returned to his monastery. This council was later overturned by the Council of Chalcedon and labeled "Latrocinium" (i.e., "Robber Council").

=== Council of Chalcedon (451) ===
A simplified diagram illustrating the Christology of Eutyches, referred to as Monophysitism. It stands in contrast to Dyophysitism, which asserts that two natures subsist separately, and Miaphysitism, which maintains that while the natures unite, a distinction remains between the parts.

The council repudiated the Eutychian doctrine of monophysitism, described and delineated the "Hypostatic Union" and two natures of Christ, human and divine; adopted the Chalcedonian Definition. For those who accept it (Eastern Orthodox, Roman Catholics, and most Protestants), it is the Fourth Ecumenical Council (calling the Second Council of Ephesus, which was rejected by this council, the "Robber Synod" or "Robber Council").

==== Aftermath ====
The Miaphysite faction held another council at Ephesus, the Third Council of Ephesus, in which it condemned the Council of Chalcedon including the Tome of Leo, in addition to Eutychianism, and reaffirmed the 12 Anathemas of Saint Cyril. This was signed by 500-700 bishops.

=== Second Council of Constantinople (553) ===
This council condemned certain writings and authors which defended the Christology of Nestorius. This move was instigated by Emperor Justinian in an effort to conciliate the Miaphysite Christians, which made up the majority of the east. It was opposed in the West, and the Popes' acceptance of the council caused a major schism.

==== Three Chapters ====
Prior to the Second Council of Constantinople was a prolonged controversy over the treatment of three subjects, all considered sympathetic to Nestorianism, the heresy that there are two separate persons in the Incarnation of Christ. Emperor Justinian condemned the Three Chapters, hoping to appeal to miaphysite Christians with his anti-Nestorian zeal. Monophysites believe that in the Incarnate Christ there is only one nature (i.e. the divine) not two while miaphysites believe that the two natures of Christ are united as one and are distinct in thought only.

Some eastern patriarchs supported the Emperor, but in the West his interference was resented, and Pope Vigilius resisted his edict on the grounds that it opposed the Chalcedonian decrees. Justinian's policy was in fact an attack on Antiochene theology and the decisions of Chalcedon. The pope assented and condemned the Three Chapters, but protests in the West caused him to retract his condemnation. The emperor called the Second Council of Constantinople to resolve the controversy.

==== Council proceedings ====
The council, attended mostly by Eastern bishops, condemned the Three Chapters and, indirectly, the Pope Vigilius. It also affirmed Constantinople's intention to remain in communion with Rome.

==== After the council ====
Vigilius declared his submission to the council, as did his successor, Pope Pelagius I. The council was not immediately recognized as ecumenical in the West, and Milan and Aquileia even broke off communion with Rome over this issue. The schism was not repaired until the late 6th century for Milan and the late 7th century for Aquileia.

Ultimately, the council failed to reconcile the Oriental Orthodox Churches, as it required acceptance of a two-nature formula that contradicted the decisions of the Council of Ephesus. This included the deposition of Dioscorus and Severus, the Patriarchs of Alexandria and Antioch, respectively, as well as the veneration of figures still associated with Nestorianism, such as Ibas of Edessa and Theodore of Mopsuestia.

=== Third Council of Constantinople (680–681) ===
The Third Council of Constantinople (680–681) mainly repudiated monothelitism, a doctrine that had gained widespread support since its formulation in 638. The Council condemned both monoenergism and monothelitism as heretical, affirming that Christ possesses two energies and two wills — divine and human.

==== Quinisext Council ====
Quinisext Council (= Fifth-Sixth Council) or Council in Trullo (692) has not been accepted by the Roman Catholic Church. Since it was mostly an administrative council for raising some local canons to ecumenical status, establishing principles of clerical discipline, addressing the Biblical canon, without determining matters of doctrine, the Eastern Orthodox Church does not consider it to be a full-fledged council in its own right, viewing it instead as an extension of the fifth and sixth councils. It gave ecclesiastical sanction to the Pentarchy as the government of the state church of the Roman Empire.

=== Second Council of Nicaea (787) ===
Second Council of Nicaea (787). In 753, Emperor Constantine V convened the Synod of Hieria, which declared that images of Jesus misrepresented him and that images of Mary and the saints were idols. The Second Council of Nicaea restored the veneration of icons and ended the first iconoclasm.

== Subsequent events ==
Eastern Orthodox sidebar

In the 9th century, Emperor Michael III deposed Patriarch Ignatius of Constantinople and Photius was appointed in his place. Pope Nicholas I declared the deposition of Ignatius invalid. After Michael was murdered, Ignatius was reinstated as patriarch without challenge and in 869–870 a council in Constantinople, considered ecumenical in the West, anathematized Photius. With Ignatius' death in 877, Photius became patriarch, and in 879–880 another council in Constantinople, which many Easterners consider ecumenical, annulled the decision of the previous council.

== See also ==
- Ancient church councils (pre-ecumenical) – church councils before the First Council of Nicaea
- Byzantine Empire
- Late ancient history of Christianity
- Outline of the Catholic ecumenical councils
- Synod of Ancyra
- Synodicon Orientale
- Timeline of Christianity
