= Pope Leo I =

Bishop of Rome from 440 to 461

Pope Saint Leo I
- Bishop of Rome
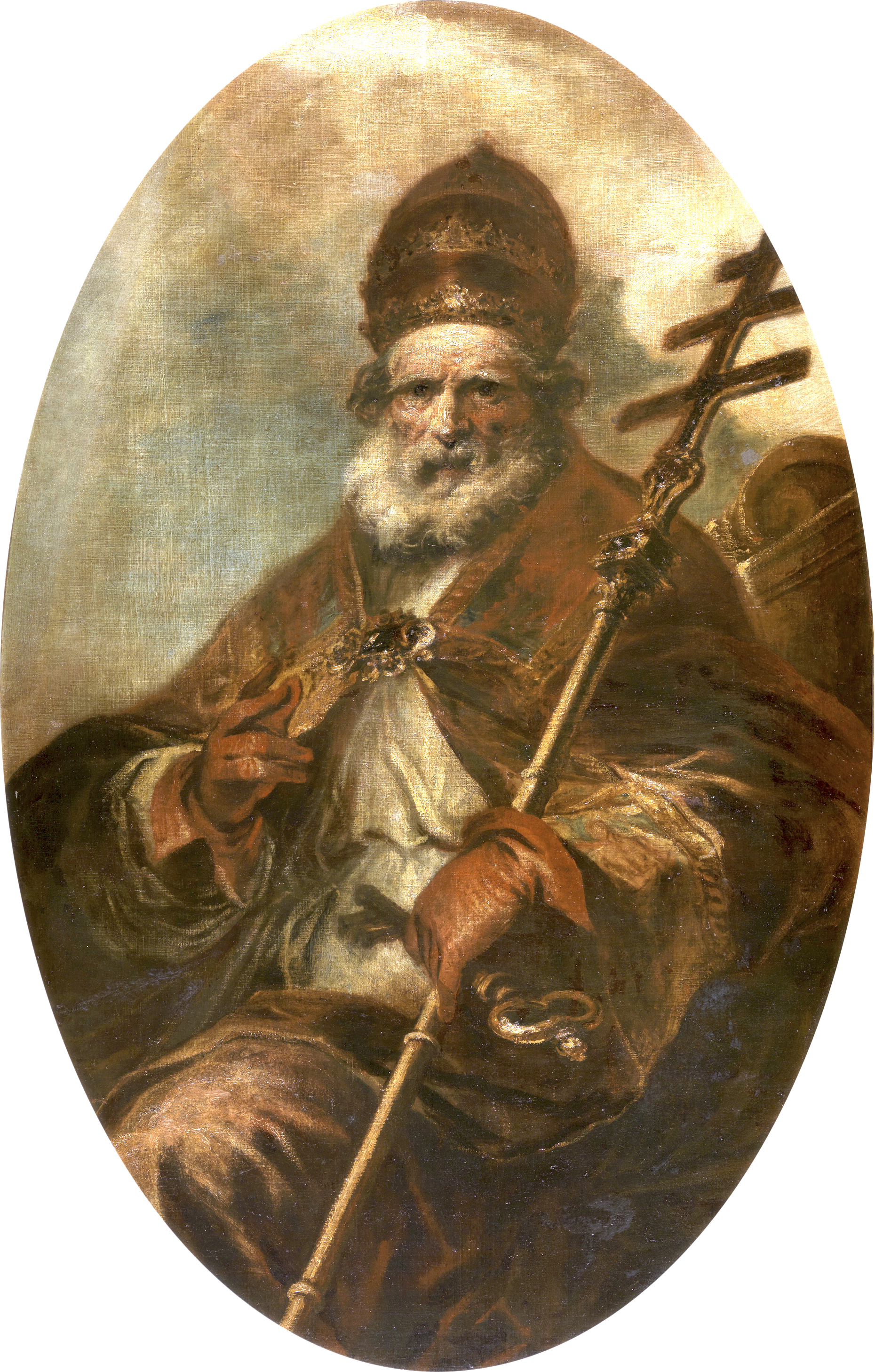
- Painting of Leo, c. 1600s, by Francisco Herrera the Younger
- Church: Catholic Church
- Papacy began: 29 September 440
- Papacy ended: 10 November 461
- Predecessor: Sixtus III
- Successor: Hilarius

Personal details
- Born: c. 391 Tuscany, Italy, Western Roman Empire
- Died: 10 November 461 (aged 69–70) Rome, Italy, Western Roman Empire
- Parents: Quintianus or Quintilianus

Sainthood
- Feast day: 10 November; 11 April (pre-1969 calendar); 18 February - additional Feast in (Eastern Orthodoxy), (Western Orthodoxy) and (True Orthodoxy)
- Venerated in: Catholic Church; Eastern Orthodox Church; Anglican Communion; Lutheran Church; Western Orthodox Church; True Orthodox Church
- Title as Saint: Pope and Doctor
- Attributes: Papal vestments; Papal tiara; Staff
- Theological work
- Era: Post-Nicene
- Language: Latin
- Tradition or movement: Chalcedonism
- Main interests: Christology
- Notable ideas: Chalcedonian Definition

Pope Leo I (Italian: Leone I) (c. 391 – 10 November 461), also known as Leo the Great (Latin: Leo Magnus; Italian: Leone Magno), was Bishop of Rome from 29 September 440 until his death on 10 November 461.

Leo was a Roman aristocrat. During his reign, he contributed significantly to developing ideas of papal authority, which he founded upon the apostolic succession of the bishop of Rome from Saint Peter. He is perhaps best known for meeting Attila the Hun in 452 and persuading him to turn back from his invasion of Italy, though how large a part his personal authority played is debated by scholars.

He is also well-known for his role in the debates of the Council of Chalcedon, the fourth ecumenical council, during which he issued the famous Tome of Leo, which elucidated the hypostatic union of Christ's two natures, divine and human, united in one person. For his theological contributions, he was named a Doctor of the Church by Pope Benedict XIV with the title Doctor unitatis Ecclesiae ("Doctor of the Church's Unity"). Additionally, he is the first of the three Popes listed in the Annuario Pontificio with the title "the Great," alongside Gregory I and Nicholas I.

== Early life ==
According to the Liber Pontificalis, he was a native of Tuscany and son of Quintianus or Quintilianus. By 431, as a deacon, he was sufficiently well known outside of Rome that John Cassian dedicated to him the treatise against Nestorius written at Leo's suggestion. About this time Cyril of Alexandria appealed to Rome regarding a jurisdictional dispute with Juvenal of Jerusalem, but it is not entirely clear whether the letter was intended for Leo in his capacity as archdeacon, or for Pope Celestine I directly.

Near the end of the reign of Pope Sixtus III, Leo was dispatched at the will of Emperor Valentinian III to settle a dispute between Aëtius, one of the chief Roman military commanders in Gaul, and the chief magistrate Albinus. Johann Peter Kirsch sees this commission as a proof of the confidence placed in the able deacon by the Imperial Court.

== Papacy ==
During Leo's absence in Gaul, Pope Sixtus III died on 11 August 440, and on 29 September Leo was unanimously elected by the people to succeed him. Soon after assuming the papal throne, Leo learned that in Aquileia, Pelagians were received into church communion without formal repudiation of their heresy; he censured this practice and directed that a provincial synod be held where such former Pelagians be required to make an unequivocal abjuration.

Leo claimed that Manichaeans, possibly fleeing Vandal Africa, had come to Rome and secretly organized there. In late 443, Leo preached a series of sermons condemning the Manichaeans and calling for Romans to denounce suspected heretics to their priests. Eventually, suspected heretics were brought to court, and likely under torture, they confessed to various crimes. By early 444, Leo announced to the bishops of Italy that the Manichaeans had been eradicated from Rome. According to his contemporary Prosper of Aquitaine, Leo exposed the Manichaeans and burned their books. He was equally firm against the Priscillianist sect. Bishop Turibius of Astorga, astonished at the spread of the sect in Spain, had addressed the other Spanish bishops on the subject, sending a copy of his letter to Leo, who took the opportunity to write an extended treatise (21 July 447) against the sect, examining its false teaching in detail and calling for a Spanish general council to investigate whether it had any adherents in the episcopate.

From a pastoral perspective, he energized charitable works in a Rome beset by famines, an influx of refugees, and poverty. He further associated the practice of fasting with charity and almsgiving, particularly on the occasion of the Quattuor tempora, (the quarterly Ember days). It was during Leo's papacy that the term "Pope", which previously meant any bishop, came to exclusively mean the Bishop of Rome.

== Papal authority ==
Leo drew many learned men about him and chose Prosper of Aquitaine to act in some secretarial or notarial capacity. Leo was a significant contributor to the centralisation of spiritual authority within the Church and in reaffirming papal authority. In 450, the Byzantine Emperor Theodosius II, in a letter to Pope Leo I, was the first to call the Bishop of Rome the Patriarch of the West, a title that would continue to be used by the popes through the present days (only interrupted by a brief period between 2006 and 2024).

By 447, he declared that heretics deserved the most severe punishments. The Pope justified the death penalty declaring that if the followers of a heresy were allowed to live, that would be the end of human and Divine law.

=== Various regional matters ===
On several occasions, Leo was asked to arbitrate disputes in Gaul. Patroclus of Arles (d. 426) had received from Pope Zosimus the recognition of a subordinate primacy over the Gallican Church, which was strongly asserted by his successor Hilary of Arles. An appeal from Chelidonius of Besançon gave Leo the opportunity to assert the pope's authority over Hilary, who defended himself stoutly at Rome, refusing to recognize Leo's judicial status. Feeling that the primatial rights of the bishop of Rome were threatened, Leo appealed to the civil power for support and obtained, from Valentinian III, a decree of 6 June 445, which recognized the primacy of the bishop of Rome based on the merits of Peter, the dignity of the city, and the legislation of the First Council of Nicaea; and provided for the forcible extradition by provincial governors of any bishop who refused to answer a summons to Rome. Faced with this decree, Hilary submitted to the pope, although under his successor, Ravennius, Leo divided the metropolitan rights between Arles and Vienne (450).

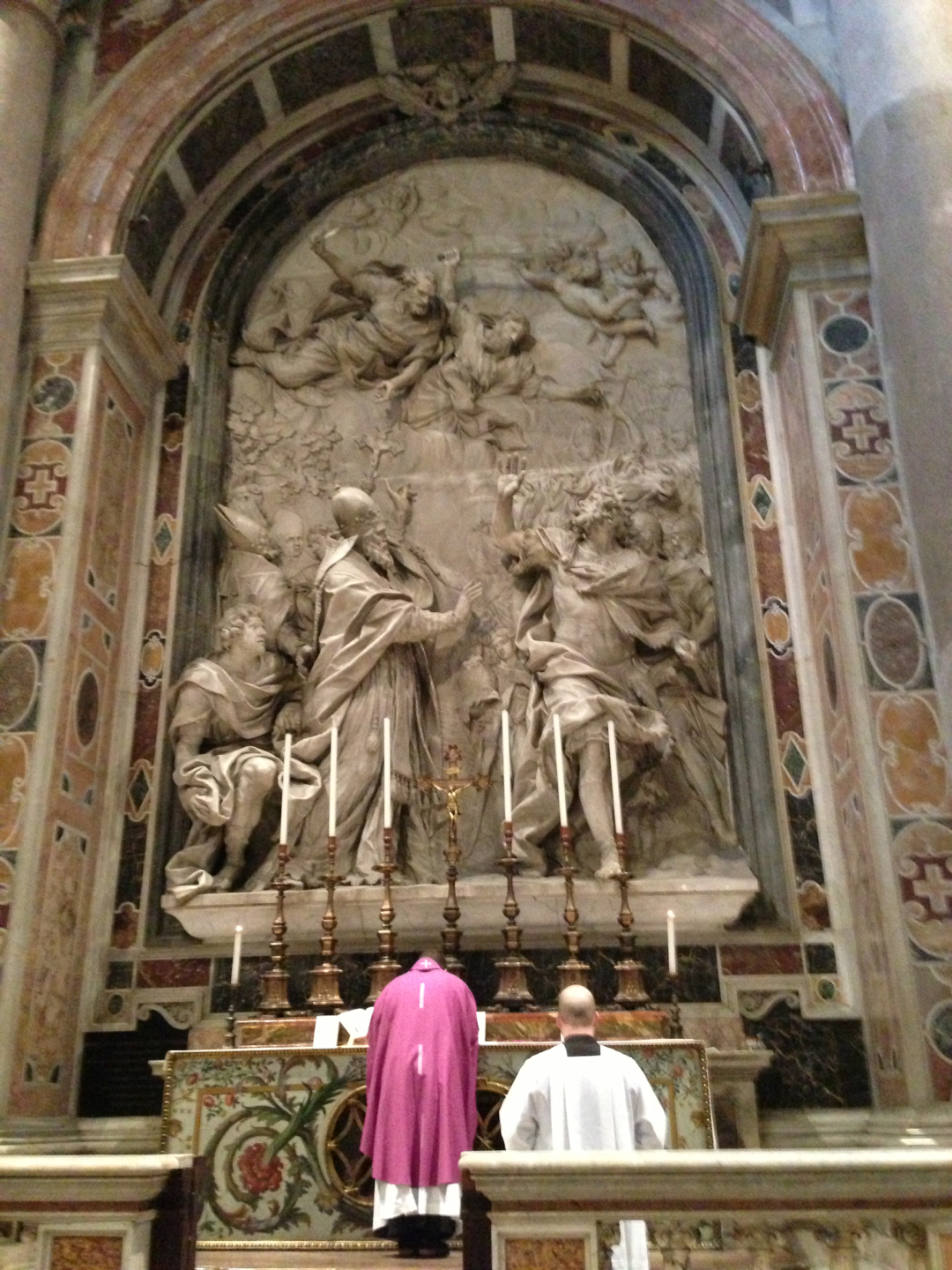
Priest celebrating Mass at the Altar of Leo the Great with the Fuga d'Attila relief by Alessandro Algardi in St. Peter's Basilica

In 445, Leo disputed with Patriarch Dioscorus, Cyril of Alexandria's successor as Patriarch of Alexandria, insisting that the ecclesiastical practice of his see should follow that of Rome on the basis that Mark the Evangelist, the disciple of Peter the Apostle and the founder of the Alexandrian Church, could have had no other tradition than that of the prince of the apostles.

The fact that the African province of Mauretania Caesariensis had been preserved to the empire and thus to the Nicene faith during the Vandal invasion and, in its isolation, was disposed to rest on outside support, gave Leo an opportunity to assert his authority there. In 446 he wrote to the Church in Mauretania in regard to a number of questions of discipline, stressing the point that laymen were not to be appointed to the episcopate.

In a letter to the bishops of Campania, Picenum, and Tuscany (443) he required the observance of all his precepts and those of his predecessors; and he sharply rebuked the bishops of Sicily (447) for their deviation from the Roman custom as to the time of baptism, requiring them to send delegates to the Roman synod to learn the proper practice.

Because of the earlier line of division between the western and eastern parts of the Roman Empire, Illyria was ecclesiastically subject to Rome. Pope Innocent I had constituted the metropolitan of Thessalonica his vicar, in order to oppose the growing influence of the patriarch of Constantinople in the area. In a letter of about 446 to a successor bishop of Thessalonica, Anastasius, Leo reproached him for the way he had treated one of the metropolitan bishops subject to him; after giving various instructions about the functions entrusted to Anastasius and stressing that certain powers were reserved to the pope himself, Leo wrote: "The care of the universal Church should converge towards Peter's one seat, and nothing anywhere should be separated from its Head."

He succeeded in having an imperial patriarch, Timothy Salophakiolos, and not Timotheus Aelurus, chosen as Coptic Orthodox Pope of Alexandria on the murder of Greek Patriarch Proterius of Alexandria.

== Writings ==
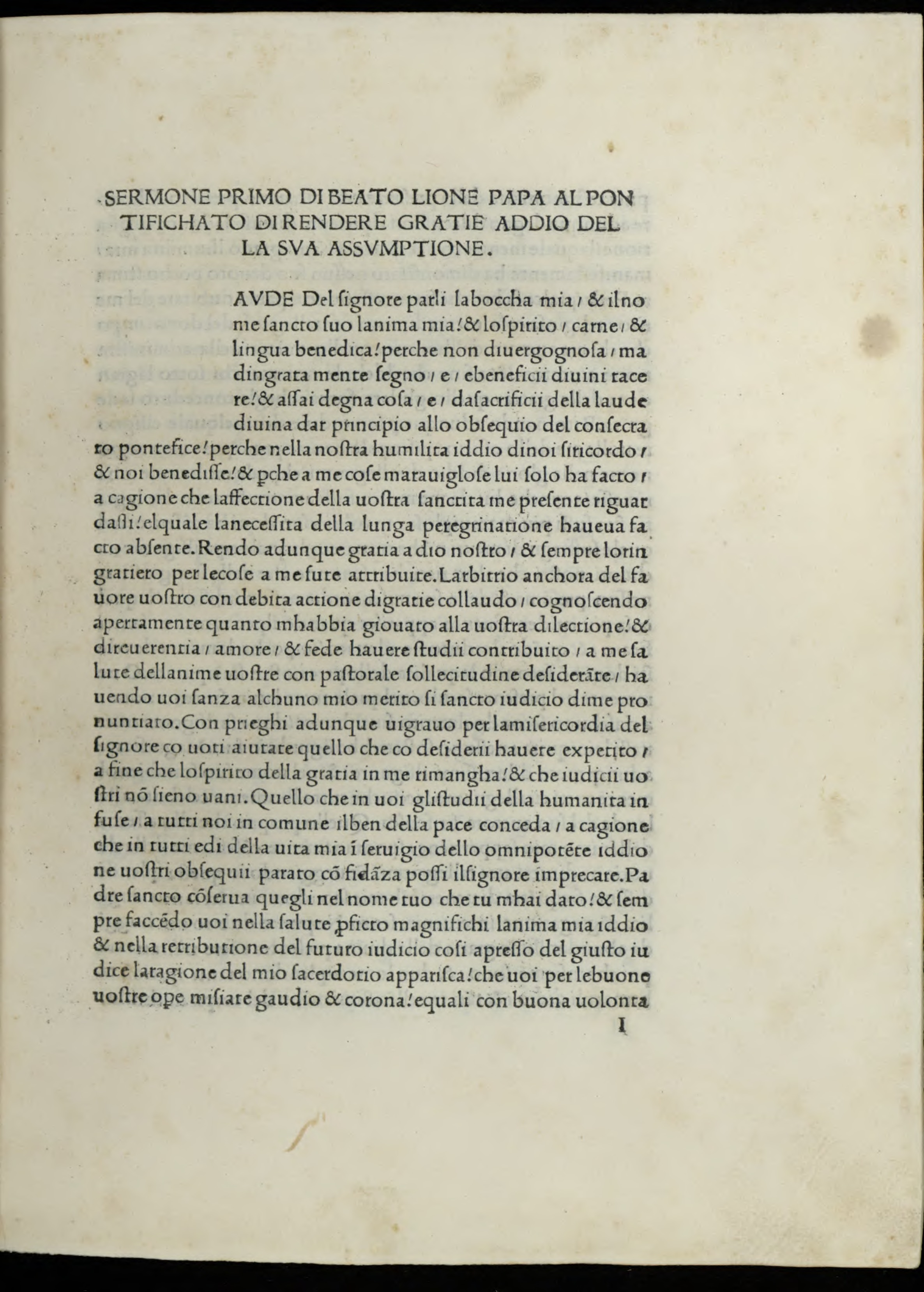
Sermones

Almost 100 sermons and 150 letters of Leo I have been preserved.

=== Tome ===
At the Second Council of Ephesus in 449, Leo's representatives delivered his famous Tome, a statement of the faith of the Roman Church in the form of a letter addressed to Archbishop Flavian of Constantinople, which repeats, in close adherence to Augustine of Hippo, the formulas of western Christology. The council did not read the letter nor did it pay any attention to the protests of Leo's legates but deposed Flavian and Eusebius of Dorylaeum, who appealed to Rome. That is one reason that the council was never recognized as ecumenical and was later repudiated by the Council of Chalcedon.

It was presented again at the subsequent Council of Chalcedon as offering a solution to the Christological controversies still raging between East and West.

=== Council of Chalcedon ===
Eutyches, in the beginning of the conflict, appealed to Leo and took refuge with him on his condemnation by Flavian, but on receiving full information from Flavian, Leo took his side decisively. Leo demanded of the emperor that an ecumenical council should be held in Italy, and in the meantime, at a Roman synod in October 449 (Source needed), repudiated all the decisions of the "Robber Synod". In his letters to the emperor and others he demanded the deposition of Eutyches as a Manichaean and Docetic heretic.

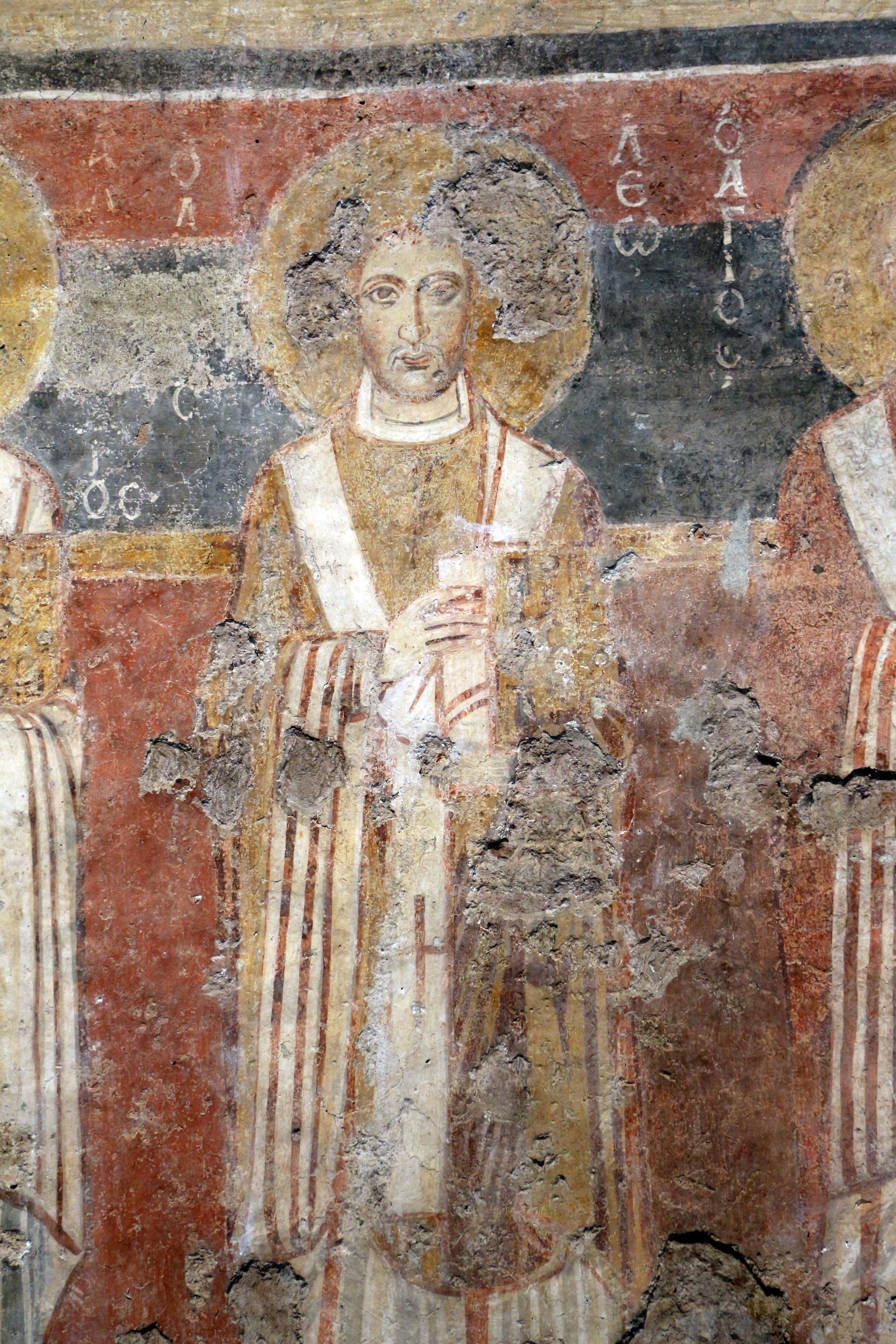
fresco from Santa Maria Antiqua

The Council of Chalcedon of 451 rejected the heresy of Eutyches who denied the true human nature of the Son of God, and affirmed the union in his one Person, without confusion and without separation, of his two natures, human and divine.

The acts of the council report:

"After the reading of the foregoing epistle, the most reverend bishops cried out: This is the faith of the fathers, this is the faith of the Apostles. So we all believe, thus the orthodox believe. Anathema to him who does not thus believe. Peter has spoken thus through Leo. So taught the Apostles. Piously and truly did Leo teach, so taught Cyril. Everlasting be the memory of Cyril. Leo and Cyril taught the same thing, anathema to him who does not so believe. This is the true faith. Those of us who are orthodox thus believe. This is the faith of the fathers. Why were not these things read at Ephesus? These are the things Dioscorus hid away."

Leo firmly declined to confirm their disciplinary arrangements, which seemed to allow Constantinople a practically equal authority with Rome and regarded the civil importance of a city as a determining factor in its ecclesiastical position; but he strongly supported its dogmatic decrees, especially when, after the accession of Emperor Leo I (457), there seemed to be a disposition toward compromise with the Eutychians.

=== Teaching on Christ ===
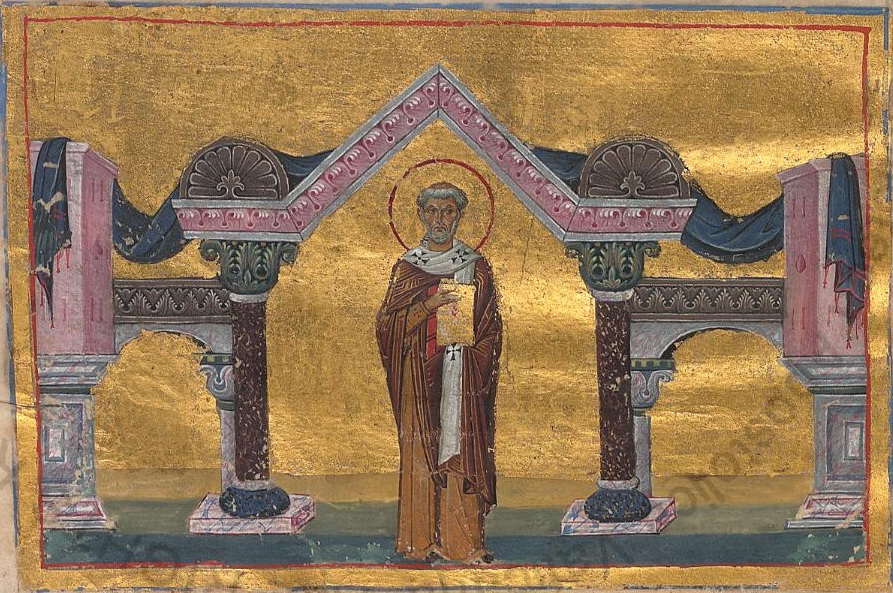
Leo the Great in the Menologion of Basil II (11th century)

Leo's writings (sermons and letters) mostly discuss theological questions concerning the person of Jesus Christ (Christology) and his role as mediator and savior (Soteriology), which is partially connected to the Council of Chalcedon, in which Roman legates represented Leo. Subsequently, through numerous letters to bishops and members of the imperial family, Leo incessantly worked for the propagation and universal reception of the faith in Christ as defined by Chalcedon, also in the eastern part of the Roman empire. Leo defends both the true divinity and true humanity of Christ against heretical one-sidedness. He takes up this topic also in many of his sermons, and over the years, he further develops his own original concepts. A central idea around which Leo deepens and explains his theology is Christ's presence in the Church, more specifically in the teaching and preaching of the faith (Scripture, Tradition and their interpretation), in the liturgy (sacraments and celebrations), in the life of the individual believer and of the organized Church, especially in a council.

To Leo the Great, Mariology is determined by Christology. If Christ were divine only, everything about him would be divine. Only his divinity would have been crucified, buried and resurrected. Mary would only be the mother of God, and Christians would have no hope for their own resurrection. The nucleus of Christianity would be destroyed. The most unusual beginning of a truly human life through her was to give birth to Jesus, the Lord and Son of King David.

=== Oriental Orthodox view ===
Leo's Christological formula however was not entirely well received. Following the death of Dioscorus, the See of Alexandria split into two rival patriarchates; opposing and supporting Chalcedon respectively. The former of which, led by Timothy II of Alexandria would condemn both the heresy of Eutyches as well as the Council of Chalcedon and the Tome of Leo at the Third Council of Ephesus. The communion that accepted Ephesus III is known today as the Oriental Orthodox Churches.

Ephesus III accused Leo's formula of two natures after the union as being fundamentally no different to the view of Nestorius, contradicting Cyril of Alexandria's formula of "mia physis tou Theo logou sesarkōmenē", or "one (mia) nature of the Word of God incarnate" (μία φύσις τοῦ θεοῦ λόγου σεσαρκωμένη).

Several Oriental Orthodox Church historians, such as Pakhoum A. El-Moharraky and Waheeb Atalla Girgis have viewed the council as a dispute with the Church of Rome over precedence among the various patriarchal sees. Coptic sources, both in Coptic and in Arabic, suggest that questions of political and ecclesiastical authority exaggerated differences between the two professions of faith. The Coptic Orthodox Christians are Miaphysites, which means they believe that Jesus Christ is both 100% human and 100% divine but in one person without mingling, confusion or alteration. In every liturgy till this day, the Copts recite "Christ's divinity parted not from His humanity, not for a single moment nor a twinkling of an eye".

=== Heir of Peter ===
Leo assumed the papacy at a time of increasing barbarian invasions; this, coupled with the decreasing imperial authority in the West, forced the Bishop of Rome to take a more active part in civil and political affairs. He was one of the first bishops of Rome to promote papal primacy based on succession from Peter the Apostle; and he did so as a means of maintaining unity among the churches.

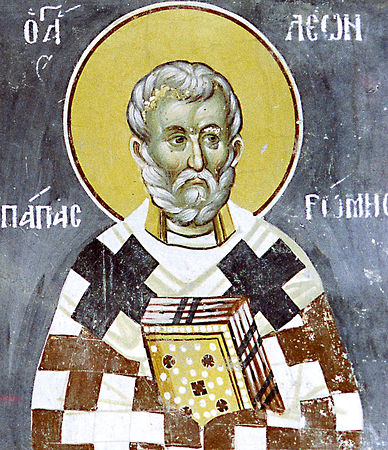
Fresco from the Church of St. George, Staro Nagoričane

Besides recourse to biblical language, Leo also described his own special relationship with Peter in terms derived from Roman law. He called himself the (unworthy) heir and deputy (vicarius) of Peter, having received his apostolic authority and being obliged to follow his example. On the one hand, Peter stood before him with a claim on how Leo was to exercise his office; on the other hand, Leo, as the Roman bishop, represented the Apostle, whose authority he held. Christ, however, always comes out as the source of all grace and authority, and Leo is responsible to him for how he fulfilled his duties (sermon 1). Thus, the office of the Roman bishop was grounded on the special relationship between Christ and Peter, a relationship that cannot be repeated per se; therefore, Leo depended on Peter's mediation, his assistance and his example in order to be able to adequately fulfill his role and exercise his authority as the Bishop of Rome, both in the city and beyond.

== Leo and Attila ==
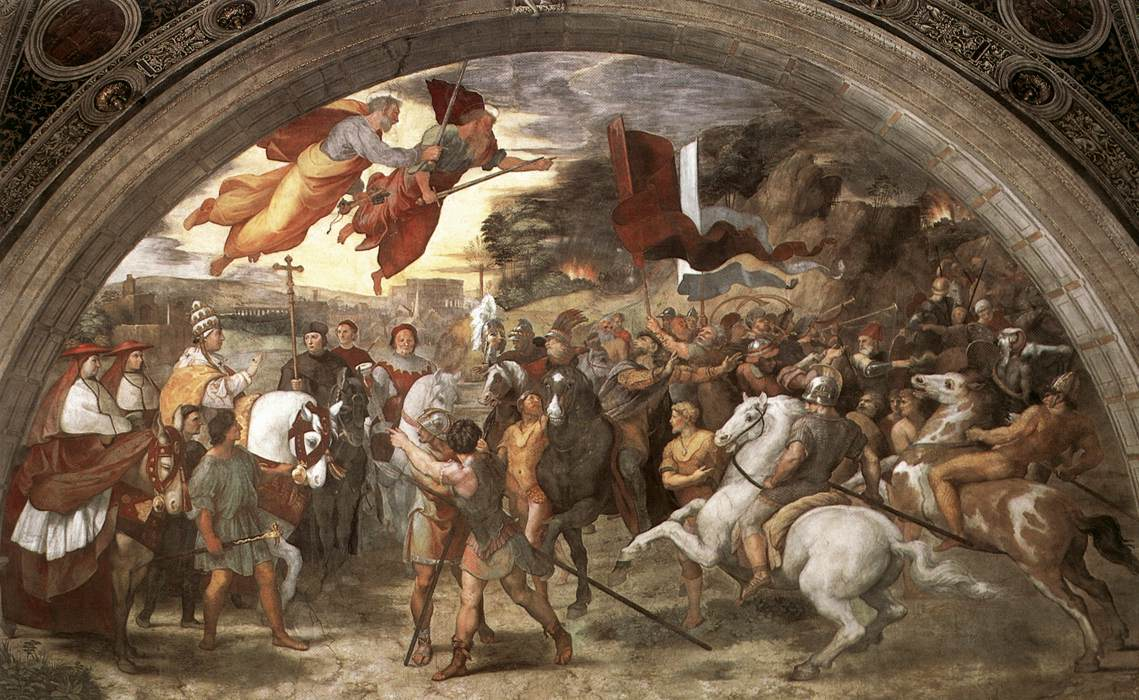
Raphael's The Meeting between Leo the Great and Attila depicts Leo, escorted by Saint Peter and Saint Paul, meeting with the Hun king outside Rome

After the indecisive outcome of the Battle of Chalons in 451, Attila invaded Italy in 452, sacking cities such as Aquileia and heading for Rome. He allegedly demanded that the sister of the reigning Emperor Valentinian III be sent to him with a dowry. In response, the emperor sent three envoys to negotiate with Attila: Gennadius Avienus, one of the consuls of 450, Memmius Aemilius Trygetius, the former urban prefect, and Leo. Little is known of the specifics of the negotiations, as a result of which Attila withdrew. Most ancient and medieval historians celebrated Leo's actions, giving him all the credit for this successful embassy. According to Prosper of Aquitaine, who was alive at the time of the event, Attila was so impressed by Leo that he withdrew. Another near-contemporary was the historian Priscus who records that Attila was dissuaded from attacking Rome by his own men because they feared he would share the fate of the Visigothic king Alaric, who died shortly after sacking the city in 410. Paul the Deacon, in the late 8th century, relates that an enormously huge man dressed in priestly robes and armed with a sword, visible only to Attila, threatened him and his army with death during his discourse with Leo, and this prompted Attila to submit to his request.

Writing in the early 20th century, the religious skeptic John B. Bury remarked:

The fact of the embassy cannot be doubted. The distinguished ambassadors visited the Hun's camp near the south shore of Lake Garda. It is also certain that Attila suddenly retreated. But we are at a loss to know what considerations were offered him to induce him to depart. It is unreasonable to suppose that this heathen king would have cared for the thunders or persuasions of the Church. The Emperor refused to surrender Honoria, and it is not recorded that money was paid. A trustworthy chronicle hands down another account which does not conflict with the fact that an embassy was sent, but evidently furnishes the true reasons which moved Attila to receive it favourably. Plague broke out in the barbarian host and their food ran short, and at the same time troops arrived from the east, sent by Marcian to the aid of Italy. If his host was suffering from pestilence, and if troops arrived from the east, we can understand that Attila was forced to withdraw. But whatever terms were arranged, he did not pretend that they meant a permanent peace. The question of Honoria was left unsettled, and he threatened that he would come again and do worse things in Italy unless she were given up with the due portion of the Imperial possessions.

Leo's intercession could not prevent the sack of the city by the Vandal King Genseric in 455, but murder and arson were repressed by his influence. The Pope and members of his clergy, went to meet the invader to implore him to desist. While the Vandals plundered the city, the gesture nevertheless prevented Rome from being burned and assured that the Basilicas of St Peter, St Paul and St John, in which part of the terrified population sought refuge, were spared. Leo assisted in rebuilding the city of Rome, restoring key places such as Saint Peter's.

== On the fundamental dignity of Christians ==
In his In Nativitate Domini, Christmas Day, sermon, "Christian, remember your dignity", Leo articulates a fundamental dignity common to all Christians, whether saints or sinners, and the consequent obligation to live up to it:

Our Saviour, dearly-beloved, was born today: let us be glad. For there is no proper place for sadness, when we keep the birthday of the Life, which destroys the fear of mortality and brings to us the joy of promised eternity. No one is kept from sharing in this happiness. There is for all one common measure of joy, because as our Lord the destroyer of sin and death finds none free from charge, so is He come to free us all. Let the saint exult in that he draws near to victory. Let the sinner be glad in that he is invited to pardon. Let the gentile take courage in that he is called to life...
Let us put off then the old man with his deeds: and having obtained a share in the birth of Christ let us renounce the works of the flesh. Christian, acknowledge thy dignity, and becoming a partner in the Divine nature, refuse to return to the old baseness by degenerate conduct. Remember the Head and the Body of which thou art a member. Recollect that thou wert rescued from the power of darkness and brought out into God's light and kingdom. By the mystery of Baptism thou wert made the temple of the Holy Ghost: do not put such a denizen to flight from thee by base acts, and subject thyself once more to the devil's thraldom: because thy purchase money is the blood of Christ, because He shall judge thee in truth Who ransomed thee in mercy, who with the Father and the Holy Spirit reigns for ever and ever. Amen.

== Death and burial ==
Leo died on 10 November 461 and his body was entombed within the portico of Old St. Peter's Basilica. He was the first pope to be buried within St. Peter's. In 688, Pope Sergius I had Leo's remains moved to the south transept, inside the basilica. The relocation was apparently due to the number of later papal burials obscuring the prominence that Sergius believed Leo's tomb should have.

== Significance ==
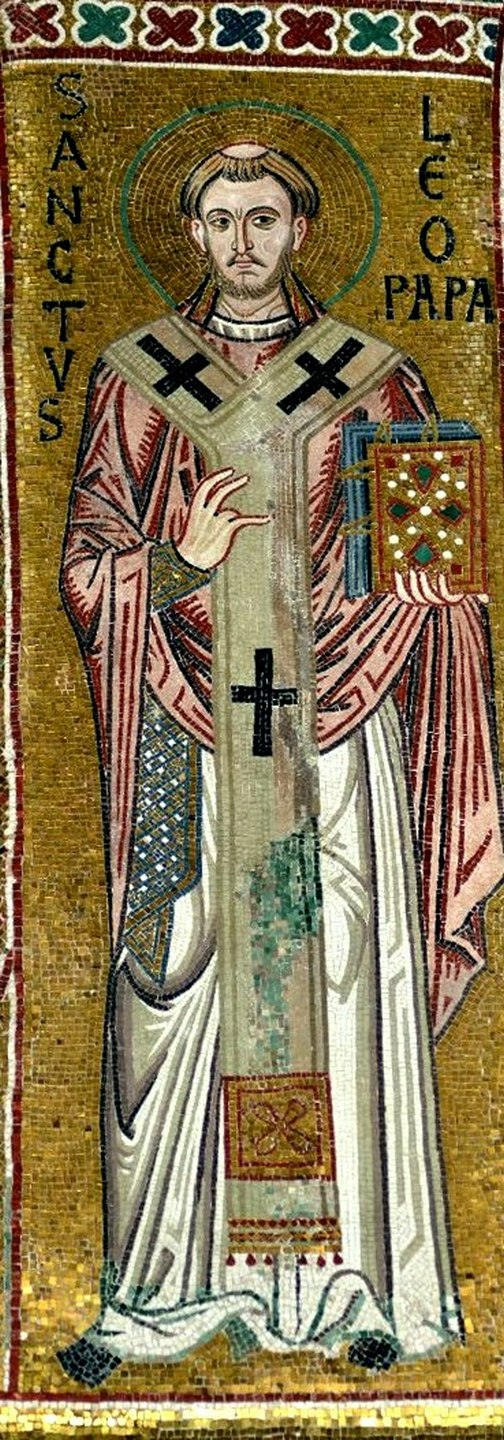
Mosaic from the Cappella Palatina

Pope Benedict XVI said that Leo's papacy was "undoubtedly one of the most important in the Church's history".

In 1754 Pope Benedict XIV proclaimed Leo I a Doctor of the Church. Next to Leo only one other pope, Gregory I, is also recognized as Doctor of the Church.

The Catholic Church marks 10 November as the feast day of Saint Leo, given in the Martyrologium Hieronymianum and the 8th-century Calendar of Saint Willibrord as the date of his death and entry to heaven. His feast was once celebrated in Rome on 28 June, the anniversary of the placing of his relics in Saint Peter's Basilica, but in the 12th century, the Gallican Rite feast of 11 April was admitted to the General Roman Calendar, which maintained that date until 1969.

The Eastern Catholic Churches as well as the Eastern Orthodox Church celebrate Saint Leo on 18 February. Leo is honored in the Church of England and in the Episcopal Church on 10 November, and in the Roman rite, passages from his writings are read in the liturgy of hours, for example at Christmas.

Since his reign, a total of 13 Popes have borne Pope Leo's name. The latest is the current Pope Leo XIV.

== Feast Day ==
- 18 February – commemoration by Eastern Orthodox Church,
- 28 June – commemoration of translation of relics in 688 by Sergius I,
- 10 November – main commemoration (death anniversary),
- 12 November – commemoration by Eastern Orthodox Church,
- 13 or 14 November – main commemoration (Diocese of Solsona),

== Hymns ==
Troparion (Tone 3)

You were the Church's instrument
in strengthening the teaching of true doctrine;
you shone forth from the West like a sun dispelling the errors of the heretics.
Righteous Leo, entreat Christ God to grant us His great mercy.

Troparion (Tone 8)

O Champion of Orthodoxy, and teacher of holiness,
The enlightenment of the universe and the inspired glory of true believers.
O most wise Father Leo, your teachings are as music of the Holy Spirit for us!
Pray that Christ our God may save our souls!

Kontakion (Tone 3)

Seated upon the throne of the priesthood, glorious Leo,
you shut the mouths of the spiritual lions.
With divinely inspired teachings of the honored Trinity,
you shed the light of the knowledge of God up-on your flock.
Therefore, you are glorified as a divine initiate of the grace of God.

== See also ==
- List of 10 longest-reigning popes
- List of Eastern Orthodox saints
- List of popes

== Bibliography ==
- Cohen, Samuel (2020). "Nostra Civitas: Heresy, Charity, and Community in Fifth-century Rome". Jahrbuch für Antike und Christentum. 63: 139–160.
- Meyendorff, John (1989). Imperial unity and Christian divisions: The Church 450-680 A.D. The Church in history. Vol. 2. Crestwood, NY: St. Vladimir's Seminary Press. ISBN 978-0-88-141056-3.
- Neil, Bronwen (2009). Leo the Great. Routledge.
- Louise Ropes Loomis, (2006) The Book of Popes (Liber Pontificalis). Merchantville, NJ: Evolution Publishing. ISBN 1-889758-86-8 (Reprint of the 1916 edition. English translation with scholarly footnotes, and illustrations).
- John Given, (2014) The Fragmentary History of Priscus: Attila, the Huns and the Roman Empire. Merchantville, NJ: Evolution Publishing. ISBN 1-935228-14-5.
- Basil Studer: Art."Leo the Great", in: A. DiBerardino: "Patrology IV", Westminster ML 1994, pp. 589–612, ISBN 978-0870611278
- Alois Grillmeier: "Christ in Christian Tradition", vols. 1 and 2/1, Westminster ML 1988/1987 (2nd revised edition), ISBN 978-0664223014 (Vol. 1), ISBN 978-0664221607 (Vol. 2, pt. 1).
- T. Jalland, The Life and Times of St. Leo the Great, London 1941.
- Hans Feichtinger: Die Gegenwart Christi in der Kirche bei Leo dem Großen, Frankfurt 2007, ISBN 978-3-631-56178-2.
- Randers-Pehrson, Justine Davis (1983). Barbarians and Romans: The Birth Struggle of Europe, A.D. 400-700. University of Oklahoma Press.
- Pope Leo's Tome ccel.org
- Early Church Texts The Tome of Leo in Greek and Latin with English translation.
- St Leo the Great the Pope of Rome Orthodox icon and synaxarion
- Opera Omnia by Migne Patrologia Latina with analytical indexes
- Hans Feichtinger: Die Gegenwart Christi in der Kirche bei Leo dem Großen, Frankfurt am Main u.a. 2007, ISBN 978-3-631-56178-2.
- Basil Studer: Art.Leo the Great, in A. DiBerardino: Patrology IV, Westminster ML 1994, S. 589–612.
- Alois Grillmeier: Jesus der Christus im Glauben der Kirche, Bd. 1 (Freiburg u.a. 1990), S. 734–750; Bd. 2/1 (Freiburg 1991), S. 131–200.
- Ekkart Sauser (1992). "Pope Leo I". In Bautz, Traugott (ed.). Biographisch-Bibliographisches Kirchenlexikon (BBKL) (in German). Vol. 4. Herzberg: Bautz. cols. 1425–1435. ISBN 3-88309-038-7.
- Rudolf Schieffer (1991). "Leo I. der Große". Lexikon des Mittelalters, V: Hiera-Mittel bis Lukanien (in German). Stuttgart and Weimar: J. B. Metzler. col. 1876–1877. ISBN 3-7608-8905-0.

Titles of Chalcedonian Christianity
Preceded by Sixtus III	Pope; 440–461	Succeeded by Hilarius
