= Ecumenical council =

Meeting of bishops to rule on Christian doctrine and other matters

An ecumenical council, also called general council, is a meeting of bishops and other church authorities to consider and rule on questions of Christian doctrine, administration, discipline, and other matters in which those entitled to vote are convoked from the whole world (oikoumene) and which secures the approbation of the whole Church.

The word "ecumenical" derives from the Late Latin oecumenicus "general, universal", from Greek oikoumenikos "from the whole world", from he oikoumene ge "the inhabited world" (as known to the ancient Greeks); the Greeks and their neighbors, considered as developed human society (as opposed to barbarian lands); in later use "the Roman world" and in the Christian sense in ecclesiastical Greek, from oikoumenos, present passive participle of oikein ("inhabit"), from oikos ("house, habitation"). The first seven ecumenical councils, recognised by both the eastern and western denominations comprising Chalcedonian Christianity, were convoked by Roman Emperors, who also enforced the decisions of those councils within the state church of the Roman Empire.

Starting with the second ecumenical council, noteworthy schisms led to non-participation by some members of what had previously been considered a single Christian Church. Thus, some parts of Christendom did not attend later councils, or attended but did not accept the results. Bishops belonging to what became known as the Church of the East participated in the first two councils. Bishops belonging to what became known as Oriental Orthodoxy participated in the first five councils, but rejected the decisions of the fifth and did not attend any subsequent ecumenical councils. Bishops belonging to what then became known as the Catholic Church and Eastern Orthodox Church participated in seven ecumenical councils, as described below, but not the fourth one of those that the Oriental Orthodox bishops participated in.

Acceptance of councils as ecumenical and authoritative varies between different Christian denominations. Disputes over Christological and other questions have led certain branches to reject some councils that others accept.

== Acceptance of councils by denomination ==
The Church of the East accepts as ecumenical the first two councils. Oriental Orthodox Churches accept the first three, while some also accept the fourth one, the Second Council of Ephesus.

Both the Catholic Church and Eastern Orthodox Church recognize in whole or in part seven councils held between the 4th to the 9th centuries as ecumenical. Some Eastern Orthodox also accept one later council as ecumenical. The Catholic Church has continued to hold general councils of the bishops in full communion with the Pope, and recognizes a total of twenty-one councils as ecumenical.

The first three councils and the Council of Chalcedon are recognized by some Lutheran Churches, Anglican Communion and Reformed Churches—though they are "considered subordinate to Scripture". The Lutheran World Federation recognizes as "exercises of apostolic authority" the same seven Ecumenical Councils that both the Catholic Church and Eastern Orthodox Church accept in whole or in part, and recognizes their decisions as authoritative; while member churches are not required to accept all theological statements produced by the Federation, but only to subscribe to the most basic Lutheran historical confessional documents, most do follow this recommendation. The Anglican Communion "acknowledge the authoritative place of the Ecumenical Councils in the life of the Church." The Anglican Communion has further affirmed the following:

The Anglican Communion has not expressly, or officially, defined, in its historic formularies or Canons, an exact number of those councils which it receives as Ecumenical, although there is a broad consensus in favour of the first four councils, and a respect for six and sometimes even seven. (Note: The first four councils referred to here are the first four of those accepted in whole or in part by both the Catholic Church and the Eastern Orthodox church; the fourth one is thus the Council of Chalcedon rather than the Second Council of Ephesus.)

== Infallibility of ecumenical councils ==
The doctrine of the infallibility of ecumenical councils states that solemn definitions of ecumenical councils, which concern faith or morals, and to which the whole Church must adhere, are infallible. Such decrees are often labeled as 'Canons' and they often have an attached anathema, a penalty of excommunication, against those who refuse to believe the teaching. The doctrine does not claim that every aspect of every ecumenical council is dogmatic, but that every aspect of an ecumenical council is free of errors or impeccable.

Both the Catholic and the Eastern Orthodox churches uphold versions of this doctrine. However, the Catholic Church holds that solemn definitions of ecumenical councils meet the conditions of infallibility only when approved by the Pope, while the Eastern Orthodox Church holds that an ecumenical council is itself infallible when pronouncing on a specific matter.

Protestant churches generally view ecumenical councils as fallible human institutions that have no more than a derived authority to the extent that they correctly expound Scripture (as most would generally consider occurred with the first three councils and the Council of Chalcedon in regard to their dogmatic decisions).

== Council documents ==
Ecumenical councils were, from the beginning, bureaucratic exercises. Written documents were circulated, speeches made and responded to, votes taken, and final documents published and distributed. A large part of what is known about the beliefs of what was condemned as heresies by the councils comes from the documents the councils quoted in order to present refutations to them, or from deduction based on the refutations alone.

Most councils dealt not only with doctrinal but also with disciplinary matters, which were decided in canons ("laws"). Study of the canons of ecumenical councils is the foundation of the development of canon law, especially the reconciling of or determination of priority between seemingly contradictory canons. Canons consist of doctrinal statements and disciplinary measures—most ecumenical councils and local synods dealt with immediate disciplinary concerns as well as major difficulties of doctrine. Eastern Orthodoxy typically views the purely doctrinal canons as dogmatic and applicable to the entire church at all times, while the disciplinary canons apply to a particular time and place and may or may not be applicable in other situations.

== Circumstances of the early ecumenical councils ==
The ecumenical councils were successors to the earlier councils (also known as synods) held in the Empire before Christianity was made legal. These include the Council of Jerusalem (c. 50), the Council of Rome (155), the Second Council of Rome (193), the Council of Ephesus (193), the Council of Carthage (251), the Council of Iconium (258), the Council of Antioch (264), the Councils of Arabia (246–247), the Council of Elvira (306), the Council of Carthage (311), the Synod of Neo-Caesarea (c. 314), the Council of Ancyra (314) and the Council of Arles (314).

Of the seven councils recognised in whole or in part by both the Catholic and the Eastern Orthodox Church as ecumenical, all were called by a Roman emperor. The emperor gave them legal status within the entire Roman Empire. All were held in the eastern part of the Roman Empire. The Bishop of Rome, self-styled as "pope" since the end of the fourth century, did not attend, although he sent legates to some of them.

Various theological and political differences led to parts of the Church to separate after some councils were held, with theological views on which councils were ecumenical becoming fragmented. The 431 Council of Ephesus—the third ecumenical council to be held—called by emperor Theodosius II to address a Christological dispute between the patriarchs Cyril of Alexandria and Nestorius of Constantinople. The attending bishops ended up fracturing into two separate synods after Cyril declared the council open prior to the arrival of the delayed delegation of eastern bishops headed by John I of Antioch, who upon arriving five days later and learning of Cyril's actions decided to declare the opening of the council by themselves and proceeded to support Nestorius. The result was the Nestorian schism between what came to be known as the Church of the East and wider Christendom.

Similarly, the Second Council of Ephesus of 449, also held in Anatolia, was called by the Byzantine Emperor Theodosius II and, though annulled by the Council of Chalcedon, was confirmed by Emperor Basiliscus, who annulled the Council of Chalcedon.

The Council of Hieria of 754, held at the imperial palace of that name close to Chalcedon in Anatolia, was summoned by Byzantine Emperor Constantine V and was attended by 338 bishops, who regarded it as the seventh ecumenical council. The Second Council of Nicaea, which annulled that of Hieria, was itself annulled at the synod held in 815 in Constantinople under Emperor Leo V. This synod, presided over by Patriarch Theodotus I of Constantinople, declared the Council of Hieria to be the seventh ecumenical council, but, although the Council of Hieria was called by an emperor and confirmed by another, and although it was held in the East, it later ceased to be considered ecumenical.

=== Catholic views on those circumstances ===
The Catholic Church does not consider the validity of an ecumenical council's teaching to be in any way dependent on where it is held or on the granting or withholding of prior authorization or legal status by any state, in line with the attitude of the 5th-century bishops who "saw the definition of the church's faith and canons as supremely their affair, with or without the leave of the Emperor" and who "needed no one to remind them that Synodical process pre-dated the Christianisation of the royal court by several centuries".

The Catholic Church recognizes as ecumenical various councils held later than the First Council of Ephesus (after which churches out of communion with the Holy See because of the Nestorian Schism did not participate), later than the Council of Chalcedon (after which there was no participation by churches that rejected Dyophysitism), later than the Second Council of Nicaea (after which there was no participation by the Eastern Orthodox Church), and later than the Fifth Council of the Lateran (after which groups that adhered to Protestantism did not participate).

Of the twenty-one ecumenical councils recognised by the Catholic Church, some gained recognition as ecumenical only later. Thus the Eastern First Council of Constantinople became ecumenical only when its decrees were rejected in the West.

== List of ecumenical councils ==
=== Early councils ===
Locations of six of the early ecumenical councils (all convened in modern-day Turkey).

All of the earliest ecumenical councils were called by a Roman emperor and were held in the Eastern Roman Empire. Other councils similarly called by an Eastern Roman emperor and held in his territory, in particular the Council of Serdica (343), the Second Council of Ephesus (449) and the Council of Hieria (754), saw themselves as ecumenical or were intended as such.

1. The First Council of Nicaea (325) repudiated Arianism, declared that Christ is "homoousios with the Father" (of the same substance as the Father), and adopted the original Nicene Creed; addressed the Quartodeciman controversy by fixing the date of Easter; recognised authority of the sees of Rome, Alexandria and Antioch outside their own civil provinces and granted the see of Jerusalem a position of honour.
2. The First Council of Constantinople (381) repudiated Arianism and Macedonianism, declared that Christ is "born of the Father before all time", revised the Nicene Creed in regard to the Holy Spirit and water baptism.
3. The Council of Ephesus (431) repudiated Nestorianism, proclaimed the Virgin Mary as the Theotokos ("Birth-giver to God", "God-bearer", "Mother of God"), repudiated Pelagianism, and reaffirmed the Nicene Creed. This council and all subsequent ones on this list are unrecognized by the Church of the East.
4. The Second Council of Ephesus (449) received Eutyches as orthodox based on his petition outlining his confession of faith. It also deposed Theodoret of Cyrrhus and Ibas of Edessa, and condemned Ibas's Letter to "Maris the Persian" (possibly a misunderstood title, indicating as the receiver a certain Catholicus Dadyeshu, bishop of Ardashir/Ctesiphon between 421 and 456; this same letter later became one of the Three Chapters). This council is unrecognized by Chalcedonians (Catholics, Eastern Orthodox and most Protestants).
4. (or 5.) The Council of Chalcedon (451) repudiated the Eutychian doctrine of monophysitism, and instead adopted the Chalcedonian Creed, which described the hypostatic union of the two natures of Christ, human and divine. It accordingly reinstated those deposed in 449 including Theodoret of Cyrus restored Ibas of Edessa to his see and declared him innocent upon reading his letter. It also deposed Dioscorus of Alexandria, and elevated the bishoprics of Constantinople and Jerusalem to the status of patriarchates. This council is rejected by Oriental Orthodox churches and is the last council explicitly recognised by the Anglican Communion.
5. The Third Council of Ephesus (475) ratified an encyclical of Emperor Basiliscus which repudiated the Council of Chalcedon and particularly the Tome of Leo. This council is unrecognized by Chalcedonians.
5. The Second Council of Constantinople (553) repudiated the Three Chapters as Nestorian, condemned Origenism, and decreed the theopaschite formula. This council and all subsequent ones on this list are rejected or at least not explicitly affirmed by Oriental Orthodox churches.
6. The Third Council of Constantinople (680–681) repudiated monothelitism and monoenergism.
  - The Quinisext Council (692), also called the Council in Trullo, addressed matters of discipline (in amendment to the 5th and 6th councils). This council is not considered to have been ecumenical by the Catholic Church.
  - The Council of Hieria (754) condemned the veneration and production of icons. This council received no recognition outside of iconoclasm.
7. The Second Council of Nicaea (787) repudiated the previous Council of Hieria.

=== Further councils recognised as ecumenical in the Catholic Church ===
As late as the 11th century, seven councils were recognised as ecumenical in the Catholic Church. Then, in the time of Pope Gregory VII (1073–1085), canonists who in the Investiture Controversy quoted the prohibition in canon 22 of the Council of Constantinople of 869–870 against laymen influencing the appointment of prelates elevated this council to the rank of ecumenical council. In the 16th century was recognition as ecumenical granted by Catholic scholars to the Councils of the Lateran, of Lyon and those that followed. The following is a list of further councils recognised as ecumenical by the Catholic Church

8. The Fourth Council of Constantinople (869–870) deposed Patriarch Photios I of Constantinople as a usurper and reinstated his predecessor Saint Ignatius, thus ending the Photian schism. Photius had already been declared deposed by the Pope, an act to which the See of Constantinople acquiesced at this council.
9. The First Council of the Lateran (1123) addressed investment of bishops and the Holy Roman Emperor's role therein.
10. The Second Council of the Lateran (1139) reaffirmed Lateran I and addressed clerical discipline (clerical celibacy, dress).
11. The Third Council of the Lateran (1179) restricted papal election to the cardinals, condemned simony, and introduced minimum ages for ordination (thirty for bishops).
12. The Fourth Council of the Lateran (1215) defined transubstantiation, and addressed papal primacy and clerical discipline.
13. The First Council of Lyon (1245) proclaimed the deposition of Emperor Frederick II and instituted a levy to support the Holy Land.
14. The Second Council of Lyon (1274) attempted reunion with the Eastern churches, defined teaching on purgatory, approved Franciscan and Dominican orders, instituted a tithe to support crusades, and defined conclave procedures.
15. The Council of Vienne (1311–1312) disbanded the Knights Templar.
  - The Council of Pisa (1409) attempted to solve the Great Western Schism.
    This council is not numbered because it was not convened by a pope and its outcome was repudiated at Constance.
16. The Council of Constance (1414–1418) resolved the Great Western Schism, and condemned Jan Hus and burned him at the stake.
  The Catholic Church declared invalid the first sessions of the Council of Constance, gathered under the authority of Antipope John XXIII, which included the famous decree Haec sancta synodus, which marked the high-water mark of the conciliar movement of reform. Decrees of the council were later annulled by Pope Sixtus IV.
  - The Council of Siena (1423–1424) addressed church reform.
    This council is not numbered as it was swiftly disbanded.
17. The separate and conflicting councils of Basel (1431-1449), and of Ferrara-Florence (1438-1445) addressed church reform and reunion with the Eastern Churches but split into two parties. The attendees at Basel became the apogee of conciliarism, still a heresy in the Catholic Church. The attendees at Florence achieved union with various Eastern Churches and very temporarily with the Eastern Orthodox Church. The Great Schism remains unhealed to this day (2026).
18. The Fifth Council of the Lateran (1512–1517) addressed church reform.
19. The Council of Trent (1545–1563, with interruptions) addressed church reform and repudiated Protestantism, defined the role and canon of Scripture and the seven sacraments, and strengthened clerical discipline and education. It is considered the founding event of the Counter-Reformation.
  This council was temporarily attended by Lutheran delegates.
20. The First Council of the Vatican (1869–1870) defined the Pope's primacy in church governance and his infallibility, repudiated rationalism, materialism and atheism, and addressed revelation, interpretation of scripture, and the relationship of faith and reason.
21. The Second Council of the Vatican (1962–1965) addressed pastoral and disciplinary issues dealing with the Church and its relation to the modern world, including liturgy and ecumenism.

=== Further councils recognised as ecumenical by Oriental Orthodox ===
4. The Second Council of Ephesus (449) received Eutyches as orthodox based on his petition outlining his confession of faith. It also deposed Theodoret of Cyrrhus and Ibas of Edessa, and condemned Ibas's Letter to "Maris the Persian" (possibly a misunderstood title, indicating as the receiver a certain Catholicus Dadyeshu, bishop of Ardashir/Ctesiphon between 421 and 456).
5. The Third Council of Ephesus (475) ratified an encyclical of Emperor Basiliscus which repudiated the Council of Chalcedon and particularly the Tome of Leo.

=== Further councils recognised as ecumenical by some Eastern Orthodox ===
Eastern Orthodox catechisms teach that there are seven ecumenical councils and there are feast days for seven ecumenical councils. Nonetheless, some Eastern Orthodox theologians consider events like the rival Council of Constantinople of 879–880, that of Constantinople in 1341–1351 and that of Jerusalem in 1672 to be ecumenical:

5. (or 6.) The Council in Trullo (692) debated ritual observance and clerical discipline in different parts of the Christian Church. Not recognised by Western churches and some Oriental churches.
8. The Fourth Council of Constantinople (Eastern Orthodox) (879–880) restored Photius to the See of Constantinople. This happened after the death of Ignatius and with papal approval.
9. The Fifth Council of Constantinople (1341–1351) affirmed hesychastic theology according to Gregory Palamas and condemned Barlaam of Seminara.
10. The Synod of Iași (or Jassy) (1642) reviewed and amended Peter Mogila's Expositio fidei (Statement of Faith, also known as the Orthodox Confession).
11. The Synod of Jerusalem (1672) defined Orthodoxy relative to Catholicism and Protestantism, and defined the orthodox Biblical canon.
12. The Synod of Constantinople (1872) addressed nationalism or phyletism in the unity of Orthodoxy.

It is unlikely that formal ecumenical recognition will be granted to these councils, despite the acknowledged orthodoxy of their decisions, so that seven are universally recognized among the Eastern Orthodox as ecumenical.

The 2016 Pan-Orthodox Council was sometimes referred to as a potential "Eighth Ecumenical Council" following debates on several issues facing Eastern Orthodoxy; however, not all autocephalous churches were represented.

== Acceptance of the councils ==
Although some Protestants reject the concept of an ecumenical council establishing doctrine for the entire Christian faith, Catholics, Lutherans, Anglicans, Methodists, Eastern Orthodox and Oriental Orthodox all accept the authority of ecumenical councils in principle. Where they differ is in which councils they accept and what the conditions are for a council to be considered "ecumenical". The relationship of the Papacy to the validity of ecumenical councils is a ground of controversy between Catholicism and the Eastern Orthodox churches. The Catholic Church holds that recognition by the Pope is an essential element in qualifying a council as ecumenical; Eastern Orthodox view approval by the Bishop of Rome (the Pope) as being roughly equivalent to that of other patriarchs. Some have held that a council is ecumenical only when all five patriarchs of the Pentarchy are represented at it. Others reject this theory in part because there were no patriarchs of Constantinople and Jerusalem at the time of the first ecumenical council.

=== Catholic Church ===
Both the Catholic and Eastern Orthodox churches recognize seven councils in the early centuries of the church, but Catholics also recognize fourteen councils in later times called or confirmed by the Pope. At the urging of German King Sigismund, who was to become Holy Roman Emperor in 1433, the Council of Constance was convoked in 1414 by Antipope John XXIII, one of three claimants to the papal throne, and was reconvened in 1415 by the Roman Pope Gregory XII. The Council of Florence is an example of a council accepted as ecumenical in spite of being rejected by the East, as the Councils of Ephesus and Chalcedon are accepted in spite of being rejected respectively by the Church of the East and Oriental Orthodoxy.

The Catholic Church teaches that an ecumenical council is a gathering of the College of Bishops (of which the Bishop of Rome is an essential part) to exercise in a solemn manner its supreme and full power over the whole Church. It holds that "there never is an ecumenical council which is not confirmed or at least recognized as such by Peter's successor". Its present canon law requires that an ecumenical council be convoked and presided over, either personally or through a delegate, by the Pope, who is also to decide the agenda; but the church makes no claim that all past ecumenical councils observed these present rules, declaring only that the Pope's confirmation or at least recognition has always been required, and saying that the version of the Nicene Creed adopted at the First Council of Constantinople (381) was accepted by the Church of Rome only seventy years later, in 451.

=== Eastern Orthodox Church ===
The Eastern Orthodox Church accepts seven ecumenical councils, with the disputed Council in Trullo—rejected by Catholics—being incorporated into, and considered as a continuation of, the Third Council of Constantinople.

To be considered ecumenical, Orthodox accept a council that meets the condition that it was accepted by the whole church. That it was called together legally is also an important factor. A case in point is the Third Ecumenical Council, where two groups met as duly called for by the emperor, each claiming to be the legitimate council. The Emperor had called for bishops to assemble in the city of Ephesus. Theodosius did not attend but sent his representative Candidian to preside. However, Cyril managed to open the council over Candidian's insistent demands that the bishops disperse until the delegation from Syria could arrive. Cyril was able to completely control the proceedings, completely neutralizing Candidian, who favored Cyril's antagonist, Nestorius. When the pro-Nestorius Antiochene delegation finally arrived, they decided to convene their own council, over which Candidian presided. The proceedings of both councils were reported to the emperor, who decided ultimately to depose Cyril, Memnon and Nestorius. Nonetheless, the Orthodox accept Cyril's group as being the legitimate council because it maintained the same teaching that the church has always taught.

Paraphrasing a rule by St Vincent of Lérins, Hasler states

... a teaching can only be defined if it has been held to be revealed at all times, everywhere, and by all believers.

Orthodox believe that councils could over-rule or even depose popes. At the Sixth Ecumenical Council, Pope Honorius and Patriarch Sergius were declared heretics. The council anathematized them and declared them tools of the devil and cast them out of the church.

It is their position that, since the Seventh Ecumenical Council, there has been no synod or council of the same scope. Local meetings of hierarchs have been called "pan-Orthodox", but these have invariably been simply meetings of local hierarchs of whatever Eastern Orthodox jurisdictions are party to a specific local matter. From this point of view, there has been no fully "pan-Orthodox" (Ecumenical) council since 787. The use of the term "pan-Orthodox" is confusing to those not within Eastern Orthodoxy, and it leads to mistaken impressions that these are ersatz ecumenical councils rather than purely local councils to which nearby Orthodox hierarchs, regardless of jurisdiction, are invited.

Others, including 20th-century theologians Metropolitan Hierotheos (Vlachos) of Naupactus, Fr. John S. Romanides, and Fr. George Metallinos (all of whom refer repeatedly to the "Eighth and Ninth Ecumenical Councils"), Fr. George Dragas, and the 1848 Encyclical of the Eastern Patriarchs (which refers explicitly to the "Eighth Ecumenical Council" and was signed by the patriarchs of Constantinople, Jerusalem, Antioch, and Alexandria as well as the Holy Synods of the first three), regard other synods beyond the Seventh Ecumenical Council as being ecumenical. Before the 20th century, the Council at Constantinople in 879 AD was recognised as the 8th ecumenical council by people like the expert on canon law, Theodore Balsamon (11th century), St. Neilos of Rhodes, St. Mark of Ephesus (15th century), St. Symeon of Thessalonica (15th century), and the Patriarch Dositheos II of Jerusalem in his Tome of Joy (17th century).

From the Eastern Orthodox perspective, a council is accepted as being ecumenical if it is accepted by the Eastern Orthodox church at large—clergy, monks and assembly of believers. Teachings from councils that purport to be ecumenical, but which lack this acceptance by the church at large, are, therefore, not considered ecumenical.

=== Oriental Orthodoxy ===
Oriental Orthodoxy accepts three ecumenical councils, the First Council of Nicaea, the First Council of Constantinople, and the Council of Ephesus. Some theologians of the Oriental Orthodox Churches, also recognize the Second Council of Ephesus as ecumenical that was ratified by the principal patriarchs in the time and the people, except the Pope. The formulation of the Chalcedonian Creed caused a schism in the Alexandrian and Syriac churches. Reconciliatory efforts between Oriental Orthodox with the Eastern Orthodox and the Catholic Church in the mid- and late 20th century have led to common Christological declarations. The Oriental and Eastern Churches have also been working toward reconciliation as a consequence of the ecumenical movement.

The Oriental Orthodox hold that the Dyophysite formula of two natures formulated at the Council of Chalcedon is inferior to the Miaphysite formula of "One Incarnate Nature of God the Word" (Byzantine Greek: Mia physis tou theou logou sarkousomene) and that the proceedings of Chalcedon themselves were motivated by imperial politics. The Alexandrian Church, the main Oriental Orthodox body, also felt unfairly underrepresented at the council following the deposition of their Pope, Dioscorus of Alexandria at the council.

=== Church of the East ===
The Church of the East accepts two ecumenical councils, the First Council of Nicaea and the First Council of Constantinople, as well as a series of their own national councils, starting with the Council of Seleucia-Ctesiphon in 410 AD. It was the formulation of Mary as the Theotokos which caused a schism with the Church of the East, now divided between the Assyrian Church of the East and the Ancient Church of the East, while the Chaldean Catholic Church entered into full communion with Rome in the 16th century. Meetings between Pope John Paul II and the Assyrian Patriarch Mar Dinkha IV led to a common Christological declaration on 11 November 1994 that "the humanity to which the Blessed Virgin Mary gave birth always was that of the Son of God himself". Both sides recognised the legitimacy and rightness, as expressions of the same faith, of the Assyrian Church's liturgical invocation of Mary as "the Mother of Christ our God and Saviour" and the Catholic Church's use of "the Mother of God" and also as "the Mother of Christ".

=== Protestantism ===
==== Lutheran Churches ====
The Lutheran World Federation, in ecumenical dialogues with the Ecumenical Patriarch of Constantinople, has affirmed all of the first seven councils as ecumenical and authoritative. It teaches:

Both Orthodox and Lutherans affirm that apostolic authority was exercised in the ecumenical councils of the Church in which the bishops, through illumination and glorification brought about by the Holy Spirit, exercised responsibility. Ecumenical councils are a special gift of God to the Church and are an authoritative inheritance through the ages. Through ecumenical councils the Holy Spirit has led the Church to preserve and transmit the faith once delivered to the saints. They handed on the prophetic and apostolic truth, formulated it against heresies of their time and safeguarded the unity of the churches.

==== Anglican Communion ====
Article XXI of the Thirty-nine Articles of Religion of Anglicanism teaches: "General Councils ... when they be gathered together, forasmuch as they be an assembly of men, whereof all be not governed with the Spirit and word of God, they may err and sometime have erred, even in things pertaining to God. Wherefore things ordained by them as necessary to salvation have neither strength nor authority, unless it may be declared that they be taken out of Holy Scripture."

The 19th Canon of 1571 asserted the authority of the Councils in this manner: "Let preachers take care that they never teach anything ... except what is agreeable to the doctrine of the Old and New Testament, and what the Catholic Fathers and ancient Bishops have collected from the same doctrine." This remains the Church of England's teaching on the subject. A modern version of this appeal to catholic consensus is found in the Canon Law of the Church of England and also in the liturgy published in Common Worship:

The Church of England is part of the One, Holy, Catholic, and Apostolic Church, worshipping the one true God, Father, Son, and Holy Spirit. It professes the faith uniquely revealed in the Holy Scriptures and set forth in the catholic creeds, which faith the Church is called upon to proclaim afresh in each generation. Led by the Holy Spirit, it has borne witness to Christian truth in its historic formularies, the Thirty-nine Articles of Religion, The Book of Common Prayer and the Ordering of Bishops, Priests and Deacons. I, AB, do so affirm, and accordingly declare my belief in the faith which is revealed in the Holy Scriptures and set forth in the catholic creeds and to which the historic formularies of the Church of England bear witness; and in public prayer and administration of the sacraments, I will use only the forms of service which are authorized or allowed by Canon.

The 1559 Act of Supremacy made a distinction between the decisions of the first four ecumenical councils, which were to be used as sufficient proof that something was heresy, as opposed to those of later councils, which could only be used to that purpose if "the same was declared heresy by the express and plain words of the ... canonical Scriptures". As such, the Anglican tradition accepts the first four ecumenical councils, though they "considered subordinate to Scripture".

While the Councils are part of the "historic formularies" of Anglican tradition, it is difficult to locate an explicit reference in Anglicanism to the unconditional acceptance of all Seven Ecumenical Councils. There is little evidence of dogmatic or canonical acceptance beyond the statements of individual Anglican theologians and bishops. Anglican cleric of Anglo-Catholic churchmanship Bishop Chandler Holder Jones, SSC, explains:

We indeed and absolutely believe all Seven Councils are truly ecumenical and Catholic—on the basis of the received Tradition of the ancient Undivided Church of East and West. The Anglican formularies address only particular critical theological and disciplinary concerns of the sixteenth and seventeenth centuries, and that certainly by design. Behind them, however, stands the universal authority of the Holy and Apostolic Tradition, which did not have to be rehashed or redebated by Anglican Catholics.

He quotes William Tighe, Associate Professor of History at Muhlenberg College in Allentown, Pennsylvania, (another member of the Anglo-Catholic wing of Anglicanism):

...despite the fact that advocates of all sides to the 16th-century religious conflict, Catholic, Lutheran and Reformed alike, were given to claiming that their particular doctrinal stances and, in some cases, distinctive practices, were in accord with those of the Early Church Fathers, or at least with those of high standing (such as St. Augustine), none [but Anglicanism] were willing to require, or even permit, their confessional stances to be judged by, or subordinated to, a hypothetical "patristic consensus" of the first four or five centuries of Christianity. But Anglicanism most certainly did, and does so to this day.

==== Methodist Churches ====
Methodist theologian Charles W. Brockwell Jr wrote that the first "four ecumenical councils produced and clarified the Niceno-Constantinopolitan Symbol (Nicene Creed), the most important document in Christian history after the Bible itself."

The Manual of the Church of the Nazarene, part of the Wesleyan-Holiness movement within Methodism, states "Our denomination receives the creeds of the first five Christian centuries as expressions of its own faith", including the Christological doctrines formulated during the first four Ecumenical Councils.

==== Other Protestant denominations ====
Some, including some fundamentalist Christians, condemn the ecumenical councils for other reasons. Independency or congregationalist polity among Protestants may involve the rejection of any governmental structure or binding authority above local congregations; conformity to the decisions of these councils is therefore considered purely voluntary and the councils are to be considered binding only insofar as those doctrines are derived from the Scriptures. Many of these churches reject the idea that anyone other than the authors of Scripture can directly lead other Christians by original divine authority; after the New Testament, they assert, the doors of revelation were closed and councils can only give advice or guidance, but have no authority. They consider new doctrines not derived from the sealed canon of Scripture to be both impossible and unnecessary whether proposed by church councils or by more recent prophets. Catholic and Orthodox objections to this position point to the fact that the Canon of Scripture itself was fixed by these councils. They conclude that this would lead to a logical inconsistency of a non-authoritative body fixing a supposedly authoritative source.

=== Nontrinitarian groups ===
Ecumenical councils are not recognised by nontrinitarian churches such as the Church of Jesus Christ of Latter-day Saints (and other denominations within the Latter Day Saint movement), Christadelphians, Jehovah's Witnesses, Church of God (Seventh-Day), their descendants and Unitarians. They view the ecumenical councils as misguided human attempts to establish doctrine, and as attempts to define dogmas by debate rather than by revelation.

== See also ==
- Buddhist councils
