= Acacius of Melitene =

- Acacius I of Melitene
- Acacius II of Melitene
