= Pope Sixtus III =

Head of the Catholic Church from 432 to 440

Pope Saint Sixtus III
- Bishop of Rome
- Church: Catholic Church
- Papacy began: 31 July 432
- Papacy ended: 18 August 440
- Predecessor: Celestine I
- Successor: Leo I

Personal details
- Born: Rome, Roman Empire
- Died: 18 August 440 Gaul, Western Roman Empire

Sainthood
- Feast day: 28 March

Pope Saint Sixtus III, also called Xystus III, was the bishop of Rome from 31 July 432 to his death on 18 August 440. His ascension to the papacy is associated with a period of increased construction in the city of Rome. His feast day is celebrated by the Catholic Church and Eastern Orthodox Church on 28 March.

== Early career ==
Sixtus was born in Rome and before his accession he was prominent among the Roman clergy, and frequently corresponded with Augustine of Hippo. According to Peter Brown, before being made pope, Sixtus was a patron of Pelagius, who was later condemned as a heretic, although Alban Butler disagrees and attributes the charge to Garnier. Nicholas Weber also disputes this, "...it was probably owing to his conciliatory disposition that he was falsely accused of leanings towards these heresies."

== Pontificate ==
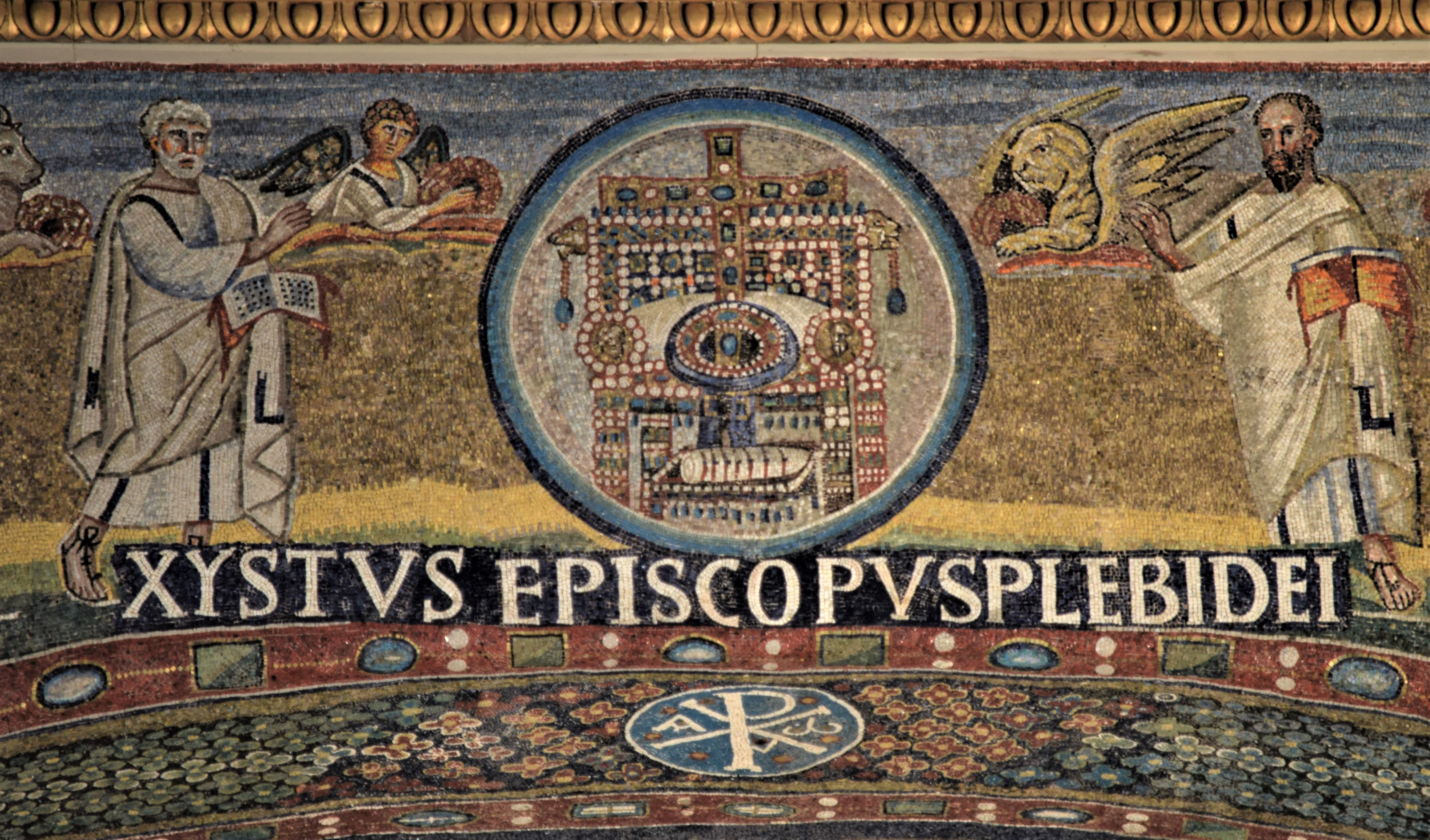
Mosaic from Santa Maria Maggiore (c. AD 435), with Sixtus III's name (Xystus Episcopus Plebi Dei, "Sixtus Bishop to the People of God.")

Sixtus was consecrated pope on 31 July 432. He attempted to restore peace between Cyril of Alexandria and John of Antioch. He also defended the rights of the pope over Illyria and the position of the archbishop of Thessalonica as head of the local Illyrian church against the ambition of Proclus of Constantinople.

His name is often connected with a great building boom in Rome: Santa Sabina on the Aventine Hill was dedicated during his pontificate. He built the Liberian Basilica as Santa Maria Maggiore, whose dedication to Mary the Mother of God reflected his acceptance of the Ecumenical council of Ephesus which closed in 431. At that council, the debate over Christ's human and divine natures turned on whether Mary could legitimately be called the "Mother of God" or only "Mother of Christ". The council gave her the Greek title Theotokos (literally "God-bearer", or "Mother of God"), and the dedication of the large church in Rome is a response to that.

Sixtus III's feast day is 28 March.

== See also ==
- List of Catholic saints
- List of Eastern Orthodox saints
- List of popes

== Literature ==
- Helmut Feld (1995). "Sixtus III". In Bautz, Traugott (ed.). Biographisch-Bibliographisches Kirchenlexikon (BBKL) (in German). Vol. 10. Herzberg: Bautz. cols. 583–584. ISBN 3-88309-062-X.

Titles of the Great Christian Church
Preceded by Celestine I	Pope; 432–440	Succeeded by Leo I (the Great)
