= Council of Ephesus (disambiguation) =

The Council of Ephesus was an Ecumenical Council that took place in 431 CE.

Council of Ephesus may also refer to:

- The Second Council of Ephesus of 449 CE
- The Third Council of Ephesus of 475 CE
