= Chalcedonian Definition =

Theological resolution adopted at the Council of Chalcedon (AD 451)

The Chalcedonian Definition (also called the Chalcedonian Creed or the Definition of Chalcedon) is the declaration of Christ as fully God and fully human, having two natures "without confusion, without change, without division, without separation", adopted at the Council of Chalcedon in AD 451. Chalcedon was an early centre of Christianity located in Asia Minor. The council was the fourth of the ecumenical councils that are accepted by Chalcedonian churches which include the Catholic and Orthodox churches.

It was the first council not to be recognised by any Oriental Orthodox church; for this reason these churches may be classified as Non-Chalcedonian.

== Context ==
The Council of Chalcedon was summoned to consider the Christological question in light of the "one-nature" view of Christ proposed by Eutyches, archimandrite at Constantinople, which prevailed at the Second Council of Ephesus in 449, sometimes referred to as the "Robber Synod".

The Council first solemnly ratified the Nicene Creed adopted in 325 and that creed as amended by the First Council of Constantinople in 381. It also confirmed the authority of two synodical letters of Cyril of Alexandria and the letter of Pope Leo I to Flavian of Constantinople.

== Content ==
The full text of the definition reaffirms the decisions of the Council of Ephesus, the pre-eminence of the Creed of Nicaea (325) and the further definitions of the Council of Constantinople (381).

In one of the translations into English, the key section, emphasizing the double nature of Christ (human and divine), runs:

Following, then, the holy Fathers, we all unanimously teach that our Lord Jesus Christ is to us One and the same Son, the Self-same Perfect in Godhead, the Self-same Perfect in Manhood; truly God and truly Man; the Self-same of a rational soul and body; co-essential with the Father according to the Godhead, the Self-same co-essential with us according to the Manhood; like us in all things, sin apart; before the ages begotten of the Father as to the Godhead, but in the last days, the Self-same, for us and for our salvation (born) of Mary the Virgin Theotokos as to the Manhood; One and the Same Christ, Son, Lord, Only-begotten; acknowledged in Two Natures unconfusedly, unchangeably, indivisibly, inseparably; the difference of the Natures being in no way removed because of the Union, but rather the properties of each Nature being preserved, and (both) concurring into One Person and One Hypostasis; not as though He was parted or divided into Two Persons, but One and the Self-same Son and Only-begotten God, Word, Lord, Jesus Christ; even as from the beginning the prophets have taught concerning Him, and as the Lord Jesus Christ Himself hath taught us, and as the Symbol of the Fathers hath handed down to us.

— Bindley 1899, p. 297

The Definition implicitly addressed a number of popular heretical beliefs. The reference to "co-essential with the Father" was directed at Arianism; "co-essential with us" is directed at Apollinarianism; "Two Natures unconfusedly, unchangeably" refutes Eutychianism; and "indivisibly, inseparably" and "Theotokos" are against Nestorianism.

== Oriental Orthodox dissent ==
The Chalcedonian Definition was written amid controversy between the Western and Eastern churches over the meaning of the Incarnation. The Western church readily accepted the creed, but some Eastern churches did not. Political disturbances prevented the Armenian bishops from attending. Even though Chalcedon reaffirmed the Third Council's condemnation of Nestorius, the Non-Chalcedonians always suspected that the Chalcedonian Definition tended towards Nestorianism. This was in part because of the restoration of a number of bishops deposed at the Second Council of Ephesus, bishops who had previously indicated what appeared to be support of Nestorian positions.

The Coptic Church of Alexandria dissented, holding to Cyril of Alexandria's preferred formula for the oneness of Christ's nature in the incarnation of God the Word as "out of two natures". Cyril's language is not consistent and he may have countenanced the view that it is possible to contemplate in theory two natures after the incarnation, but the Church of Alexandria felt that the Definition should have stated that Christ be acknowledged "out of two natures" rather than "in two natures".

The definition defines that Christ is "acknowledged in two natures", which "come together into one person and one hypostasis". The formal definition of "two natures" in Christ was understood by the critics of the council at the time, and is understood by many historians and theologians today, to side with Western and Antiochene Christology and to diverge from the teaching of Cyril of Alexandria, who always stressed that Christ is "one". Modern analysis of the sources of the creed and the acts of the council show that the bishops considered Cyril the great authority and that even the language of "two natures" derives from him.

This miaphysite position, historically characterised by Chalcedonian followers as "monophysitism", though this is denied by the dissenters, formed the basis for the distinction of the Coptic, Ethiopian, Syriac and Armenian Apostolic churches.

== Sources ==
- Bindley, T. Herbert, ed. (1899). The Oecumenical Documents of the Faith. London: Methuen.
- Edwards, Mark J. (2009). Catholicity and Heresy in the Early Church. Farnham: Ashgate. ISBN 9780754662914.
- Grillmeier, Aloys (1975) [1965]. Christ in Christian Tradition: From the Apostolic Age to Chalcedon (451) (2nd revised ed.). Louisville: Westminster John Knox Press. ISBN 9780664223014.
- Gwynn, David M. (2009). "The Council of Chalcedon and the Definition of Christian Tradition". Chalcedon in Context: Church Councils 400–700. Liverpool: Liverpool University Press. pp. 7–26. ISBN 9781846316487.
- Schaff, Philip, ed. (1885). "The Definition of Faith of the Council of Chalcedon" . Nicene and Post-Nicene Fathers. Series II. Vol. Vil. XIV. Edinburgh: T. & T. Clark – via Wikisource.
- Kelly, John N. D. (2006) [1972]. Early Christian Creeds (3rd ed.). London-New York: Continuum. ISBN 9780826492166.
- Meyendorff, John (1989). Imperial unity and Christian divisions: The Church 450–680 A.D. Crestwood, NY: St. Vladimir's Seminary Press. ISBN 9780881410563.
- Price, Richard; Gaddis, Michael, eds. (2005a). The Acts of the Council of Chalcedon. Vol. 1. Liverpool: Liverpool University Press. ISBN 9780853230397.
- Price, Richard; Gaddis, Michael, eds. (2005b). The Acts of the Council of Chalcedon. Vol. 2. Liverpool: Liverpool University Press. ISBN 9780853230397.
- Price, Richard; Gaddis, Michael, eds. (2005c). The Acts of the Council of Chalcedon. Vol. 3. Liverpool: Liverpool University Press.
- Price, Richard (2009a). "The Council of Chalcedon (451): A Narrative". Chalcedon in Context: Church Councils 400–700. Liverpool: Liverpool University Press. pp. 70–91. ISBN 9781846316487.
- Price, Richard (2009b). "Truth, Omission, and Fiction in the Acts of Chalcedon". Chalcedon in Context: Church Councils 400–700. Liverpool: Liverpool University Press. pp. 92–106. ISBN 9781846316487.
- Roueché, Charlotte (2009). "Acclamations at the Council of Chalcedon". Chalcedon in Context: Church Councils 400–700. Liverpool: Liverpool University Press. pp. 169–177. ISBN 9781846316487.
