= Acathius I of Melitene =

3rd-century bishop and saint from Armenia

Saint Acathius
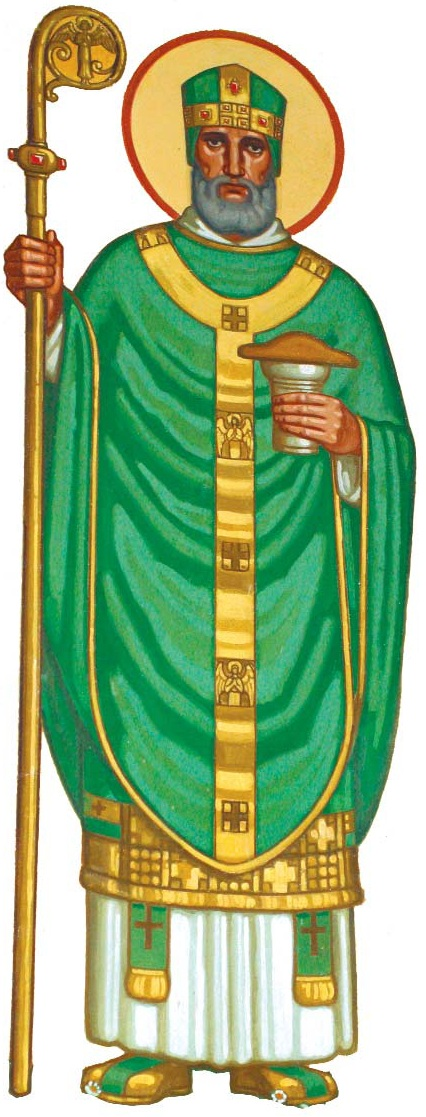
- Born: unknown ?
- Died: c. 251 ?
- Venerated in: Roman Catholic Church; Eastern Orthodox Church; Oriental Orthodox Church
- Feast: varies, generally 31 March
- Attributes: crown of thorns

Saint Acathius (died c. 251, also known as Acacius or Achates) was bishop of Melitene (now Malatya in modern Turkey) in the third century, although he is occasionally given as bishop of Antioch. Melitene was the capital of the Roman Province of Second Armenia.

He is not to be confused with the later Acacius of Melitene, conspicuous as an opponent of Nestorius and a participant at the Council of Ephesus in 431.

== Life ==
He lived in the time of the persecution of Decius, and although it is certain that he was cited before the tribunal of Marcian to give an account of his faith, it is not certain that he died for it. He was indeed condemned to death, but his prudence and constancy so impressed the Emperor as to obtain his discharge from custody after he had undergone considerable suffering.

He was famous both for the splendour of his doctrinal teaching and the miracles he wrought. The Eastern Orthodox Church venerates him on different days, but especially on 31 March. He had also a name of Agathangelos, that means "good angel".
