= Pope Celestine I =

Head of the Catholic Church from 422 to 432

Pope Saint Celestine I
- Bishop of Rome
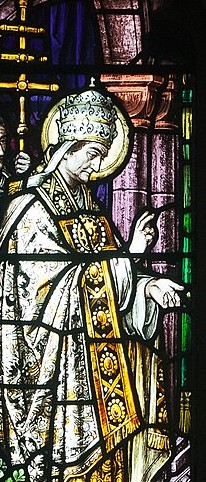
- Stained glass window depiction of Pope Celestine I, Ireland
- Church: Catholic Church
- Papacy began: 10 September 422
- Papacy ended: 27 July 432
- Predecessor: Boniface I
- Successor: Sixtus III

Personal details
- Born: c. 359 Rome, Roman Empire
- Died: 27 July 432

Sainthood
- Feast day: 27 July (Catholic); 8 April (Eastern Orthodox); 3 Epip (Coptic Christianity)
- Venerated in: Catholic Church; Eastern Orthodox Church; Oriental Orthodoxy
- Attributes: Dove; Dragon; Flame

Pope Celestine I (Latin: Caelestinus I) (c. 359 – 27 July 432) was the bishop of Rome from 10 September 422 to his death on 27 July 432. Celestine's pontificate was largely spent combatting various teachings deemed heretical. He was instrumental in the condemnation of Nestorius in the Council of Ephesus when Cyril of Alexandria appealed him to make a decision; in response, Celestine delegated to Cyril the job of condemning Nestorius if he did not recant his teachings. He supported the mission of the Gallic bishops that sent Germanus of Auxerre in 429, to Britain to address Pelagianism, and later commissioned Palladius as bishop to the Scots of Ireland and northern Britain.

== Early life and family ==
Celestine I was a Roman from the region of Campania. Nothing is known of his early history except that his father's name was Priscus. According to John Gilmary Shea, Celestine was a relative of the emperor Valentinian. He is said to have lived for a time at Milan with St. Ambrose. The first known record of him is in a document of Pope Innocent I from the year 416, where he is spoken of as "Celestine the Deacon".

== Pontificate ==
According to the Liber Pontificalis, the start of his papacy was 3 November. However, Tillemont places the date at 10 September. The Vatican also gives his pontificate as starting on 10 September 422.

Various portions of the liturgy are attributed to Celestine I, but without any certainty on the subject. In 430, he held a synod in Rome, at which the teachings of Nestorius were condemned. The following year, he sent delegates to the First Council of Ephesus, which addressed the same issue. Four letters written by him on that occasion, all dated 15 March 431, together with a few others, to the African bishops, to those of Illyria, of Thessalonica, and of Narbonne, are extant in re-translations from the Greek; the Latin originals having been lost.

Celestine actively condemned the Pelagians and was zealous for Roman orthodoxy. To this end he was involved in the initiative of the Gallic bishops to send Germanus of Auxerre and Lupus of Troyes travelling to Britain in 429 to confront bishops reportedly holding Pelagian views.

He sent Palladius to Ireland to serve as a bishop in 431. Celestine strongly opposed the Novatians in Rome; as Socrates Scholasticus writes, "this Celestinus took away the churches from the Novatians at Rome also, and obliged Rusticulus their bishop to hold his meetings secretly in private houses." The Novationists refused absolution to the lapsi, but Celestine argued that reconciliation should never be refused to any dying sinner who sincerely asked for it. He was zealous in refusing to tolerate the smallest innovation on the constitutions of his predecessors. As St. Vincent of Lerins reported in 434:

Holy Pope Celestine also expresses himself in like manner and to the same effect. For in the Epistle which he wrote to the priests of Gaul, charging them with connivance with error, in that by their silence they failed in their duty to the ancient faith, and allowed profane novelties to spring up, he says: "We are deservedly to blame if we encourage error by silence. Therefore rebuke these people. Restrain their liberty of preaching."

In a letter to certain bishops of Gaul, dated 428, Celestine rebukes the adoption of special clerical garb by the clergy. He wrote: "We [the bishops and clergy] should be distinguished from the common people [plebe] by our learning, not by our clothes; by our conduct, not by our dress; by cleanness of mind, not by the care we spend upon our person".

== Death and legacy ==
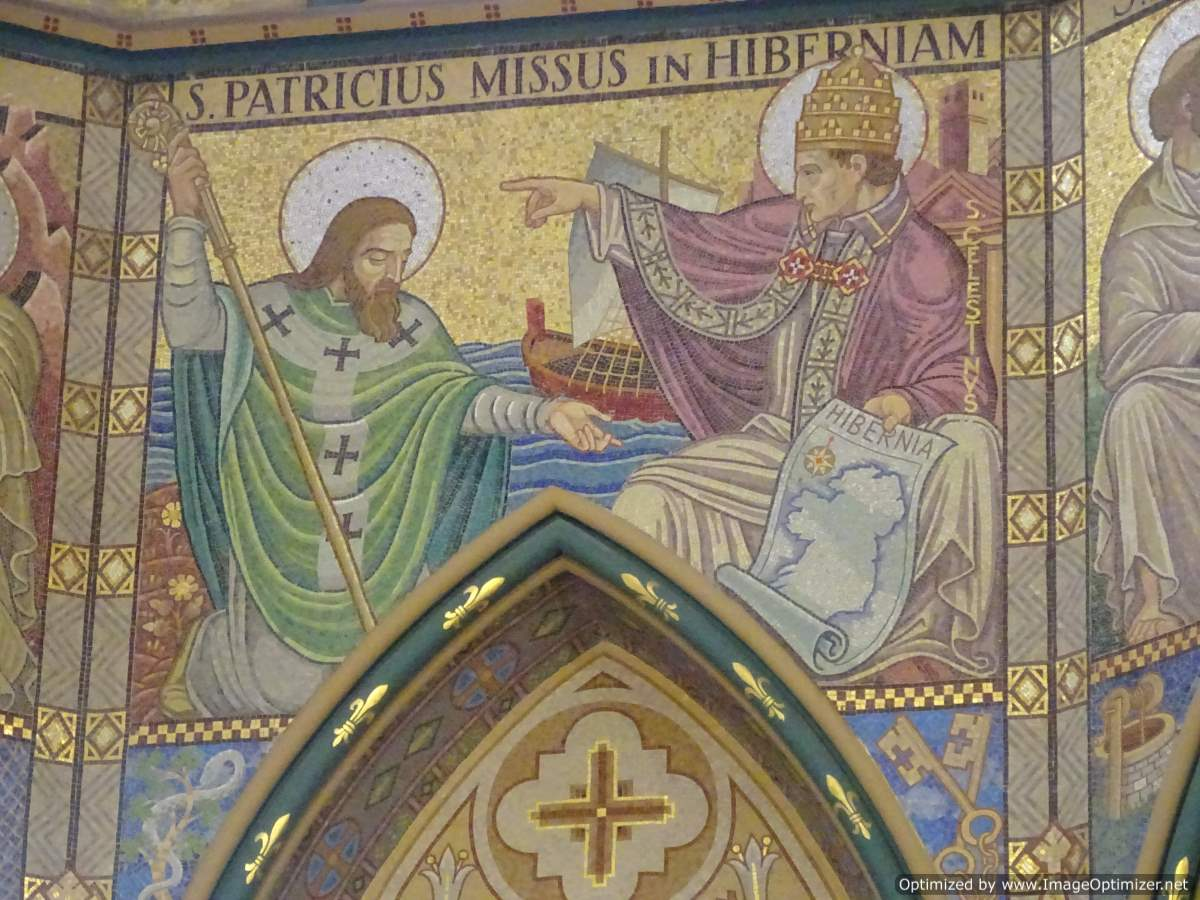
Saint Patrick sent to Ireland by Pope Celestine I; wall mosaic in St Mary's Cathedral, Kilkenny.

There are several interpretations for the date of Celestine's death. Different sources for the Liber Pontificalis provide a date of death as April 6 or 8, 432. This interpretation is favored by the Eastern Orthodox church, and fixed the feast day in this tradition.

Critical analysis of alternative sources shows the April date is inconsistent with the succession of Sixtus III, as well as the number of days Celestine was on the papal throne. By counting the number of days from election to his death, Tillemont calculated date of Celestine's death to be July 26, 432.

Louis Duchesne, when compiling the first complete critical edition of the Liber Pontificalis in 1886, similarly calculated a date of July 27, 432, which is now largely accepted in the Western tradition (and is marked as Celestine's feast day by the Roman church).

Celestine was buried in the cemetery of St. Priscilla on the Via Salaria, but his body, subsequently moved, now lies in the Basilica di Santa Prassede. In art, Celestine is portrayed as a pope with a dove, dragon, and flame, and is recognized by the Oriental Orthodox, Eastern Orthodox, and Catholic Churches as a saint.

== See also ==
- List of popes
- List of Catholic saints

Titles of the Great Christian Church
Preceded by Boniface I	Pope; 422–432	Succeeded by Sixtus III
