= Leo's Tome =

5th-century papal bull to Flavian of Constantinople

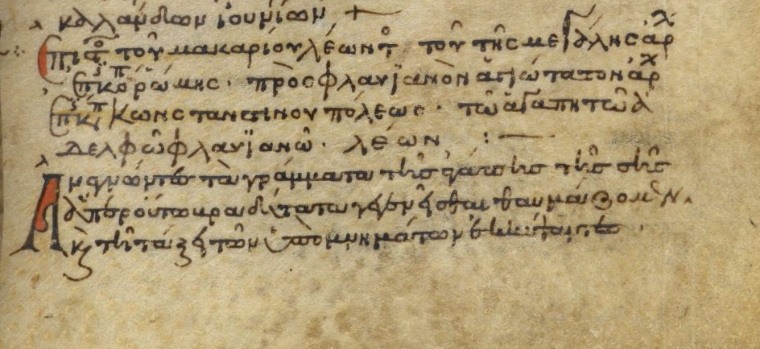
Greek manuscript of Leo's Tome from 1111, British Library

Leo's Tome (also Tomus ad Flavianum) was a rescript sent by Pope Leo I to Archbishop Flavian of Constantinople, explaining the position of the see of Rome in matters of Christology. The letter was written in response to a letter from Flavian, who had excommunicated Eutyches, who also wrote to the pope to appeal the excommunication.

The text confesses that Christ has two natures, being both fully human and fully divine. The letter was a topic of debate at the Council of Chalcedon in 451, being ultimately accepted by the council as a doctrinal explanation of the nature of the person of Christ. Several major eastern sees (later known as the Oriental Orthodox Churches) rejected it for its seemingly Nestorian tendencies.

== Summary of the text ==
Acknowledging the letter of Flavian that prompted the reply and the "proceedings of the bishops," the Pope declares that he now understands the controversy. He condemns Eutyches in the first paragraph, impugning the wayward presbyter's learning and misunderstanding of the Creed. Leo states that those who recite the creed profess that they "believe in God the Father Almighty, and in Jesus Christ his only Son our Lord, who was born of the Holy Ghost and the Virgin Mary"; by these three clauses "the engines of almost all heretics are shattered." Leo recounts the Church's doctrine regarding the coequal nature of God the Father and God the Son. Bespeaking the necessity of the Incarnation, he next offers scriptural justification for the dogma and against the position of Eutyches, noting that the latter, for his own illumination on this matter, might have read relevant passages in Matthew, St. Paul's Epistle to the Romans, or Isaiah. Eutyches, the Pope says, believes Christ not to have been of our nature, but rather to have been the Word made flesh, i.e. to have taken a body that was created directly for the purpose, not a body truly derived from that of his Mother; in this Eutyches errs, for the Holy Ghost made the Virgin fertile, and from her body a real body was derived.

Leo insists that both natures of Christ were maintained, both met in one Person; this is the "appropriate remedy for our ills," and Christ is, from the human element, capable of death and, from the divine, incapable. By taking up our nature and, therefore, "a share in our infirmities," furthermore, Jesus did not become "a partaker in our transgressions...enriching what was human, not impairing what was divine." The form of God does not take away the form of a servant, nor does the servant's form impair God's form. God willed to be confined to the flesh, "to be subjected to the laws of death." The wondrousness of the Nativity does not imply that Christ lacks human nature; the natures co-exist in Christ, each performing the duties proper to it.

Again invoking the text of the Creed, Pope Leo illustrates the coexistence of human and divine natures in Jesus, also drawing upon references to the New Testament, e.g. "The infancy of the Babe is exhibited by the humiliation of swaddling clothes: the greatness of the Highest is declared by the voices of angels." One Nature, such as that promulgated by Eutyches, does not claim, "I and the Father are one," while also stating, "the Father is greater than I"; two natures exist in one Person. Saint Peter is brought forward as the earliest example of a believer who rejects all other theories of the nature of Christ in order to declare Him the Son of the living God; for this declaration of faith, Peter is especially rewarded by Jesus.

The Resurrection of Jesus and the interval between that event and the Ascension is that which makes the "faith entire and clear of all darkness": in that time, Jesus sought to demonstrate that the two natures existed in him without division. Turning now to John, Leo reaffirms that to deny the human nature of Christ is to dissolve Jesus, and to deny the redemptive mystery of the resurrection and also of the crucifixion, whose indignities only the human nature of Christ could have suffered.

The Pope is astonished that the folly of Eutyches has not been more soundly rebuked, and he concludes by asking Flavian's "solicitude...to see that, if by God’s merciful inspiration the case is brought to a satisfactory issue, the inconsiderate and inexperienced man be cleansed also from this pestilent notion of his." Pleading Christlike mercy on the matter, Leo notes Eutyches's perceived occasional indifference to his heresy, and seems hopeful that the excommunicate will soon recant. He names the men who will bear his position to Eutyches before wishing Flavian health and noting the date.

== Reception by Nestorius ==
Nestorius, who was condemned and exiled after the Council of Ephesus in 431, was aware of the Tome. In The Bazaar of Heracleides he references it as "the letter of our father Leo". Following this, he continually praises Leo for what he considers the correct christology; "And because they were [filled] with suspicion about me and were not believing what I was saying, as one that dissembles the truth and represses exact speech, God appointed for this [purpose] a preacher who was guiltless of this suspicion, Leo, who used to preach the truth undaunted."
