= Acacius II of Melitene =

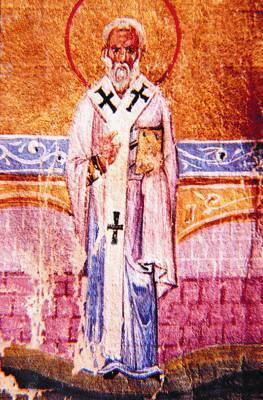
Acathius of Melitene

Acacius II of Melitene (? - after 437) was metropolitan bishop of Melitene. He was an opponent of Nestorius and close ally of Cyril of Alexandria at the Council of Ephesus of 431. He delivered a homily at Ephesus and wrote two letters to Cyril. Cyril in turn wrote two letters to Acacius. Melitene was a town in Eastern Anatolia.

His successor was Constantine of Melitene. He would have been a young bishop at the time of the Second Council of Ephesus.
