= Third Council of Ephesus =

475 Oriental Orthodox religious council

- Date: 475
- Accepted by: Oriental Orthodox Churches
- Previous council: Council of Chalcedon (not accepted by the Oriental Orthodox); Second Council of Ephesus
- Convoked by: Emperor Basiliscus
- President: Pope Timothy II of Alexandria
- Attendance: 500-700
- Topics: Miaphysitism, Monophysitism, Dyophysitism, Restoration the complete autonomy of the Exarchate of Ephesus
- Documents and statements: Condemnations of Eutyches, the Council of Chalcedon and the Tome of Leo

The Third Council of Ephesus was held in the Anatolian city of Ephesus in 475. It was presided over by Pope Timothy II of Alexandria, and also attended by Peter the Fuller, then Patriarch of Antioch, and Paul the Exarch of Ephesus.

It ratified a recent Encyclical of Emperor Basiliscus, reportedly signed by 500-700 bishops throughout the Empire, which condemned the Council of Chalcedon and particularly the Tome of Leo. This council thus constitutes one of the most significant synodical condemnations of Chalcedon for the Oriental Orthodox. In response to the accusations of certain Chalcedonians that they, the Non-Chalcedonians, had adopted the erroneous teachings of Eutyches, the attendees of Ephesus III summarily anathematized all teachings which compromised the humanity of Christ, but without any explicit mention of Eutyches.

Additionally, the council restored the complete autonomy of the Ecclesiastical Exarchate of Ephesus (corresponding to the civil Diocese of Asia), which had been compromised at Chalcedon by ascribing authority to the Patriarch of Constantinople over Thrace, Pontus, and Asia.
