= Eutyches =

Presbyter and archimandrite at Constantinople

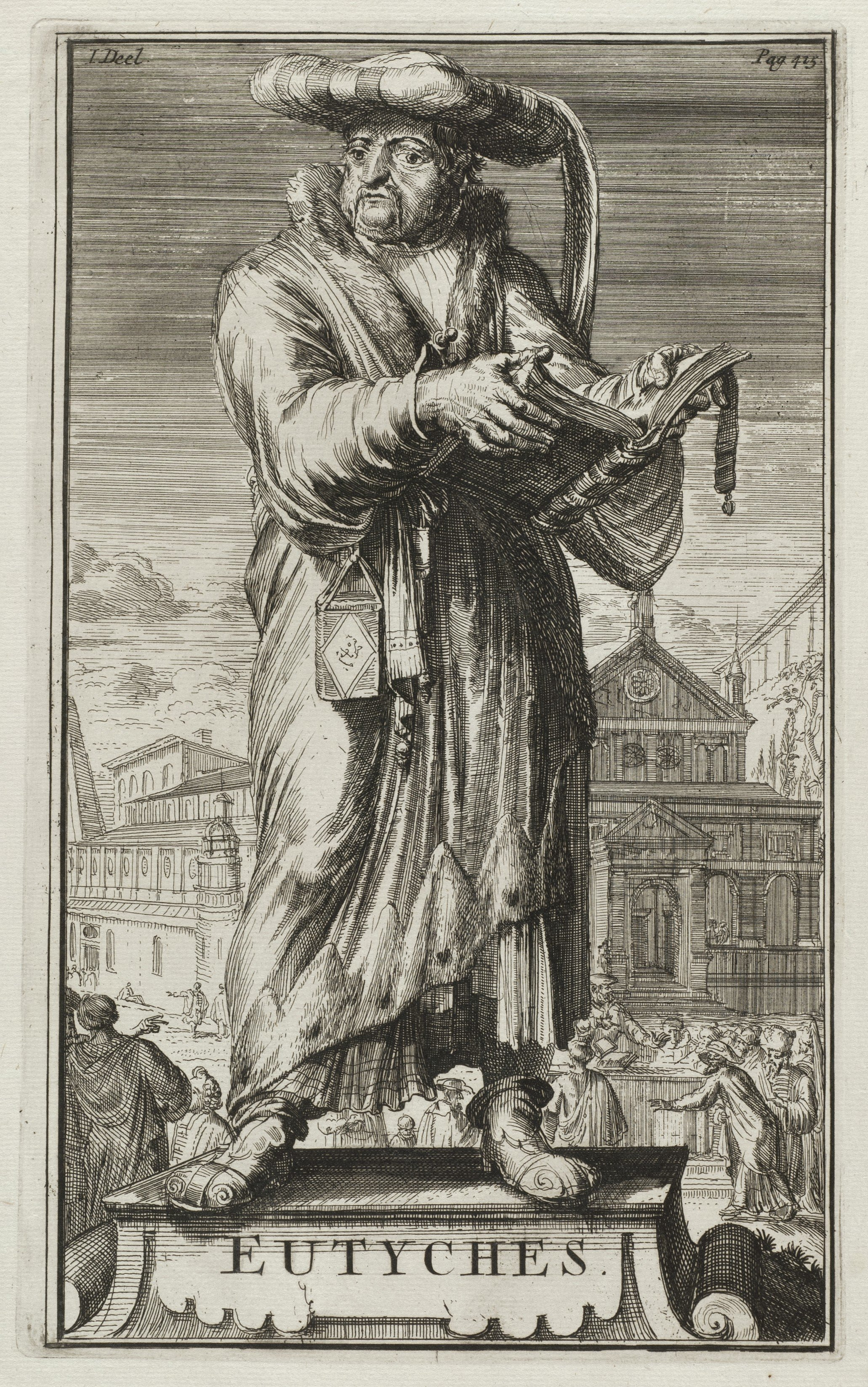
Artist's impression of Eutyches in a 1701 engraving by Dutch Baroque artist Romeyn de Hooghe.

Eutyches (Ancient Greek: Εὐτυχής; c. 375–454) or Eutyches of Constantinople was a presbyter and archimandrite at Constantinople. He first came to notice in 431 at the First Council of Ephesus, for his vehement opposition to the teachings of Nestorius. Eutyches was condemned for having adopted a polar opposite view of Nestorianism, where the two natures (Greek: hypostases) of Christ fuse together to form one, single Divine nature, dubbed Monophysitism. This was condemned at the Council of Chalcedon and Third Council of Ephesus. He himself, however, would reject this interpretation of his thought.

== Life ==
Eutyches was an archimandrite of a monastery outside the walls of Constantinople, where he ruled over 300 monks. He was much respected and was godfather to Chrysaphius, an influential eunuch at the court of Theodosius II.

== Controversy ==
The Monophysite view of Christ's nature ascribed to Eutyches

The patriarch of Constantinople, Nestorius, having asserted that Mary ought not to be referred to as the "Mother of God" (Greek: Theotokos, literally "God-bearer"), was deposed by the Council of Ephesus; in combating this assertion, Eutyches was claimed to have declared that Jesus Christ was "a fusion of human and divine elements", which caused his deposition as well seventeen years after the First Council of Ephesus at the 448 AD Synod of Constantinople. Later, his teachings would also be condemned at the Council of Chalcedon and the Third Council of Ephesus.

According to Nestorius, all the human experiences and attributes of Christ are to be assigned to 'the man', as a personal subject distinct from God the Word, though united to God the Word from the moment of conception. The fathers of the Synod of Constantinople argued that in opposition to this Eutyches had inverted the assertion to the opposite extreme, asserting that human nature and divine nature were combined into the single nature of Christ without any alteration, absorption or confusion: that of the incarnate Word. Although this accorded with the later teaching of Cyril of Alexandria, Eutyches was accused of having gone beyond Cyril in denying that Christ was "consubstantial with us men", by which he did not intend to deny Christ's full manhood, but to stress His uniqueness.

In the surviving acts of the 448 Synod in which Eutyches presents his own defence; however, he himself rejects this understanding of his thought, and the doctrine that became known as "Eutychianism" is presented only by hostile parties as an interpretation of the implications of his thinking. In an overview of the proceedings against Eutyches, which they view as a type of imperial show trial directed against Cyril's radical supporters, the historians Patrick T. R. Gray and George A. Bevan argue that "what [Eutyches] himself said gives us no reason to see him as having been anything other than a vigorous champion of a late Cyrillian position."

== Career ==
Eutyches denied that Christ's humanity was limited or incomplete, a view that some thought similar to the Alexandrine doctrine. In any event, the energy and imprudence with which Eutyches asserted his opinions led to his being misunderstood. He was accused of heresy by Domnus II of Antioch and Eusebius, bishop of Dorylaeum, at a synod presided over by Flavian at Constantinople in 448. His explanations deemed unsatisfactory, the council deposed him from his priestly office and excommunicated him.

In 449, however, the Second Council of Ephesus was convened by Dioscorus of Alexandria, who was under the impression that Eutyches had renounced Monophysitism. Overawed by the presence of a large number of Egyptian monks, the council not only reinstated Eutyches to his office but also deposed Eusebius, Domnus, and Flavian, his chief opponents. The council's judgment conflicted with the opinion of the bishop of Rome, Leo, who, departing from the policy of his predecessor Celestine, had written very strongly to Flavian in support of the doctrine of "two natures in one person".

Meanwhile, the emperor Theodosius II died. His successor, Marcian, married Theodosius's sister, Pulcheria. In October 451, Marcian and Pulcheria summoned a council that met at Chalcedon, attended by Dioscorus and at which he was condemned. There the Second Council of Ephesus was called a "robber synod," at which some bishops alleged that Dioscorus had threatened them with death if they did not agree with him, a claim that they recanted afterwards. That previous synod's proceedings were annulled, and, in deviance to the teaching of Cyril of Alexandria, it was declared that the two natures subsist individually and 'come together to form one person and one hypostasis.' Eutyches died in exile, but of his later life nothing is known.

Those who did not approve the Council of Chalcedon were later erroneously accused of being "Monophysites", and formed the Oriental Orthodox communion. They were wrongfully accused of agreeing with Eutyches's view of 'one nature' in Christ and rejecting Christ's dual consubstantiality (with the Father and with man); however, the Oriental Orthodox Churches use the term Miaphysitism to describe their Christology, and explicitly denounce the teachings of Eutyches. The term is directly taken from Cyril of Alexandria's formula "mia physis tou Theo Logou sesarkomene" ("one nature of God the Word made flesh"). In May 1973, the late Pope of Alexandria, Pope Shenouda III, visited Rome and penned a Christological statement with the Pope of Rome, Pope Paul VI, that further detailed this position.

Eutyches's memory was kept alive by the Chalcedonians such as Leo I, who used the term 'Eutychian' as a pejorative description of the non-Chalcedonians who in their turn accused the Chalcedonians of being 'Nestorians'.
