= Thaw (weather) =

Period when temperature rises after cold weather

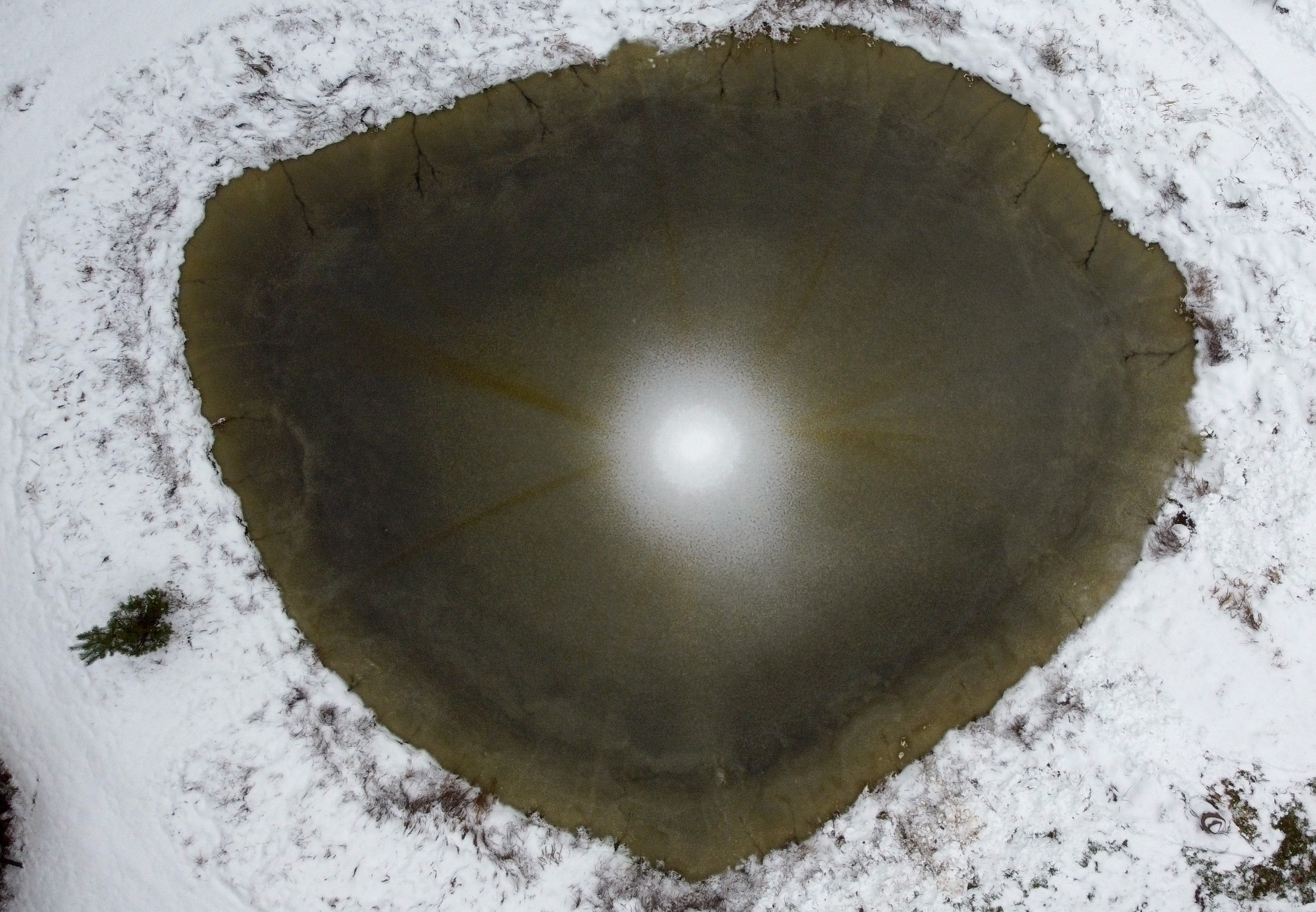
Thawing of snow on a pond in Kõrvemaa, Estonia (2023)

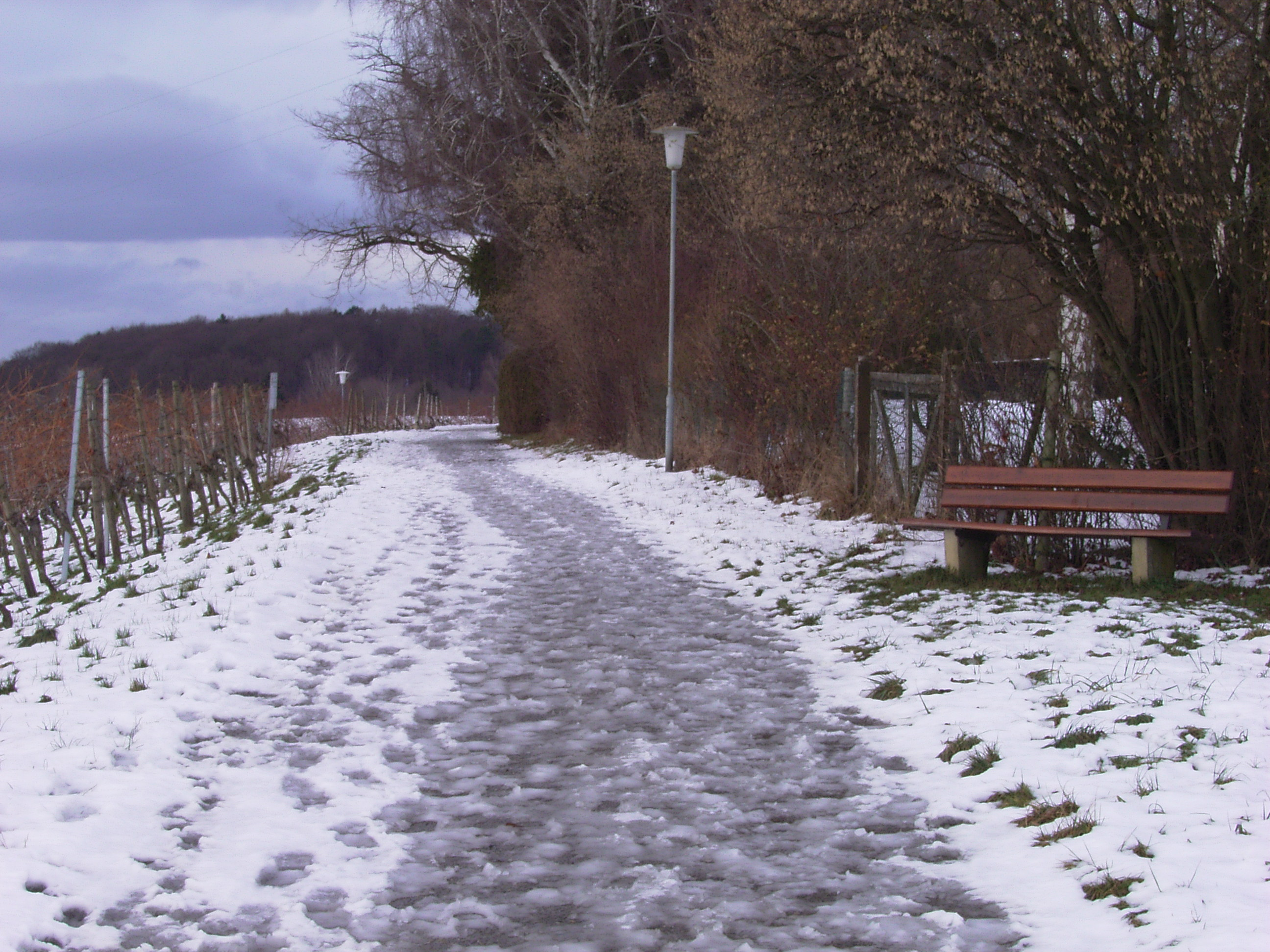
Thaw

Thaw is the period when the snow and ice melt, at the end of the winter, in cold climates.

== January thaw ==
January thaw is a term applied to a thaw or rise in temperature in mid-winter found in mid-latitude North America.

Sinusoidal estimates of expected temperatures, for northern locales, usually place the lowest temperatures around January 23 and the highest around July 24, and provide fairly accurate estimates of temperature expectations. Actual average temperatures in North America usually significantly differ twice over the course of the year

- Mid-autumn temperatures tend to be warmer than predicted by the sinusoidal model, creating the impression of extended summer warmth known as Indian summer.
- For five days around January 25, temperatures are usually significantly warmer than predicted by the sinusoidal estimate, and also warmer than neighboring temperatures on both sides.

During this "thaw" period, usually lasting for about a week, temperatures are generally about 6 °C (10 °F) above normal. This varies from year to year, and temperatures fluctuate enough that such a rise in late-January temperature would be unremarkable; what is remarkable (and unexplained) is the tendency for such rises to occur more commonly in late January than in mid-January or early February, which sinusoidal estimates have to be slightly warmer.

In some regions (such as northern Canada) this phenomenon will not be manifest as a "thaw" in the technical sense, since temperatures will remain below freezing.

The January thaw is believed to be a weather singularity. A possible physical mechanism for such phenomena was offered in the 1950s by E.G. Bowen: he suggested that some "calendaricities" (as he called them) might be explicable in terms of meteoric particles from cometary orbits acting as ice nuclei in terrestrial clouds; his theory then received some support from several sources. However, Bowen's ideas later fell out of favour with the development of atmospheric dynamic modelling techniques, although one of his rainfall peaks does seem to correspond with the date of the January thaw.

Data analysis has not found statistically significant support for the supposed January thaw. The authors of this study state that "the effects of sampling in finite climate records are wholly adequate to account for the existence of January thaw 'features' in northeastern U.S. temperature data."

== See also ==
- Chinook wind
