= Trigger guard =

Firearm part surrounding the trigger to hinder accidental discharge

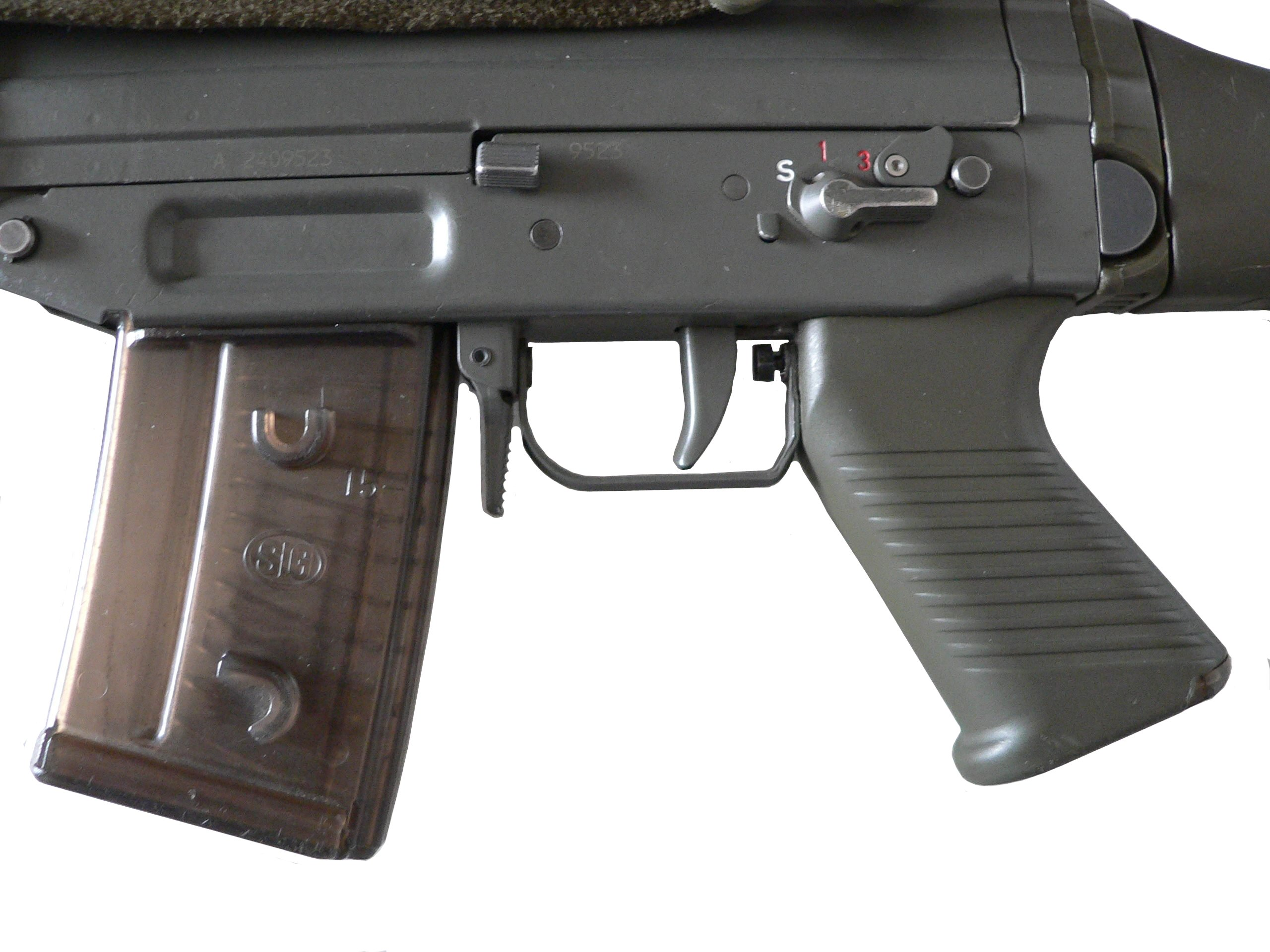
Trigger guard of a SG 550 rifle

A trigger guard is a protective loop surrounding the trigger of a firearm designed to prevent unwanted contact with the trigger, which may cause an accidental discharge. Other devices that use a trigger-like actuator mechanism, such as inhalers, crossbows and power tools, may also have trigger guards.

On rifles with a bottom metal, the trigger guard is often incorporated as part of the bottom metal.

== Winter trigger guards ==
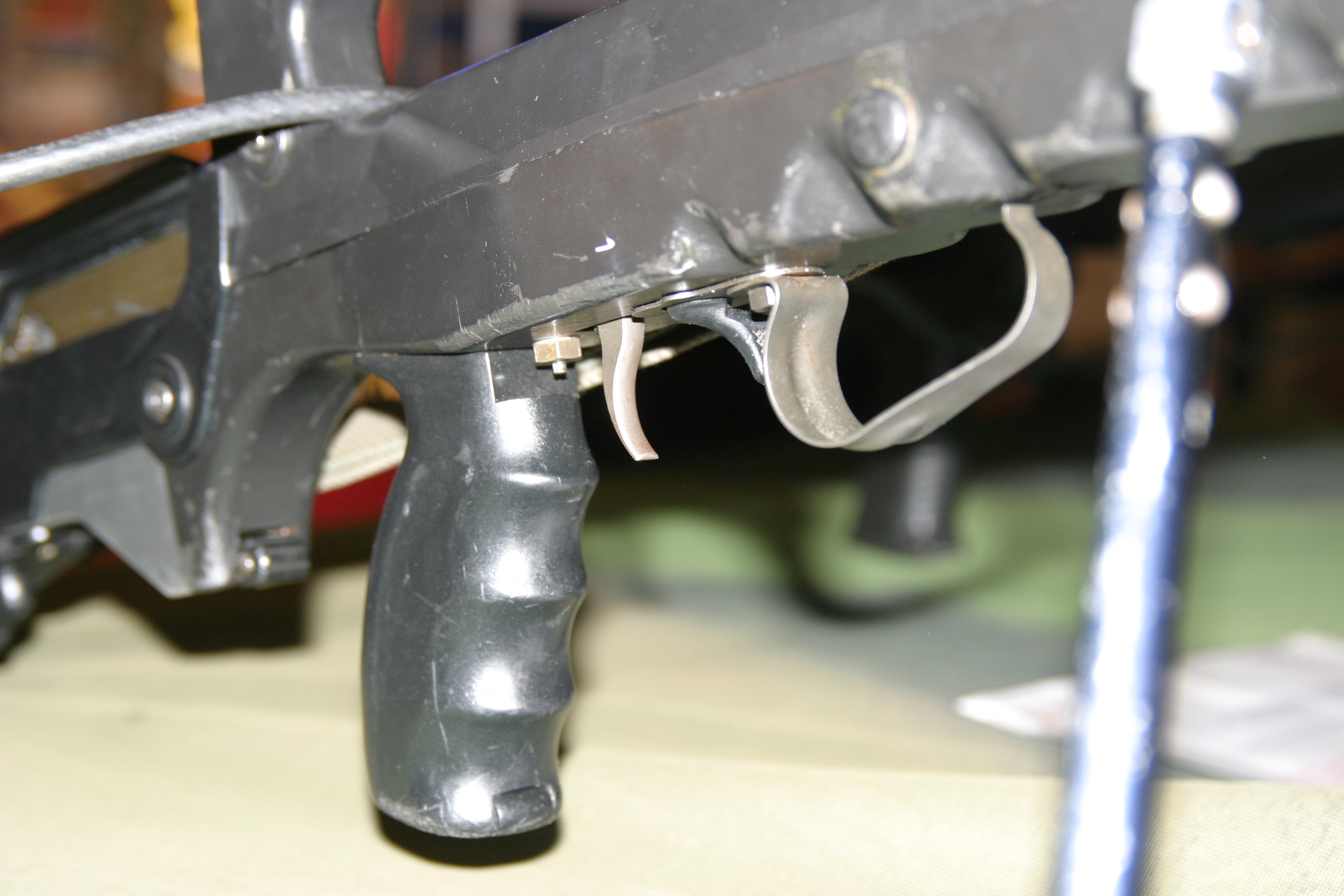
Trigger guard of the FAMAS swept forward for use in Arctic conditions

Some firearms may have their trigger guard removed or repositioned as not to impair use with large cold weather gloves on, especially those intended to be used in arctic conditions. Quite notably, the Accuracy International Arctic Warfare line of rifles have enlarged trigger guards for use in cold climates, primarily northern Sweden.

== See also ==
- Glossary of firearms terms
