= Seven Sleepers' Day =

Feast day commemorating the legend of the Seven Sleepers

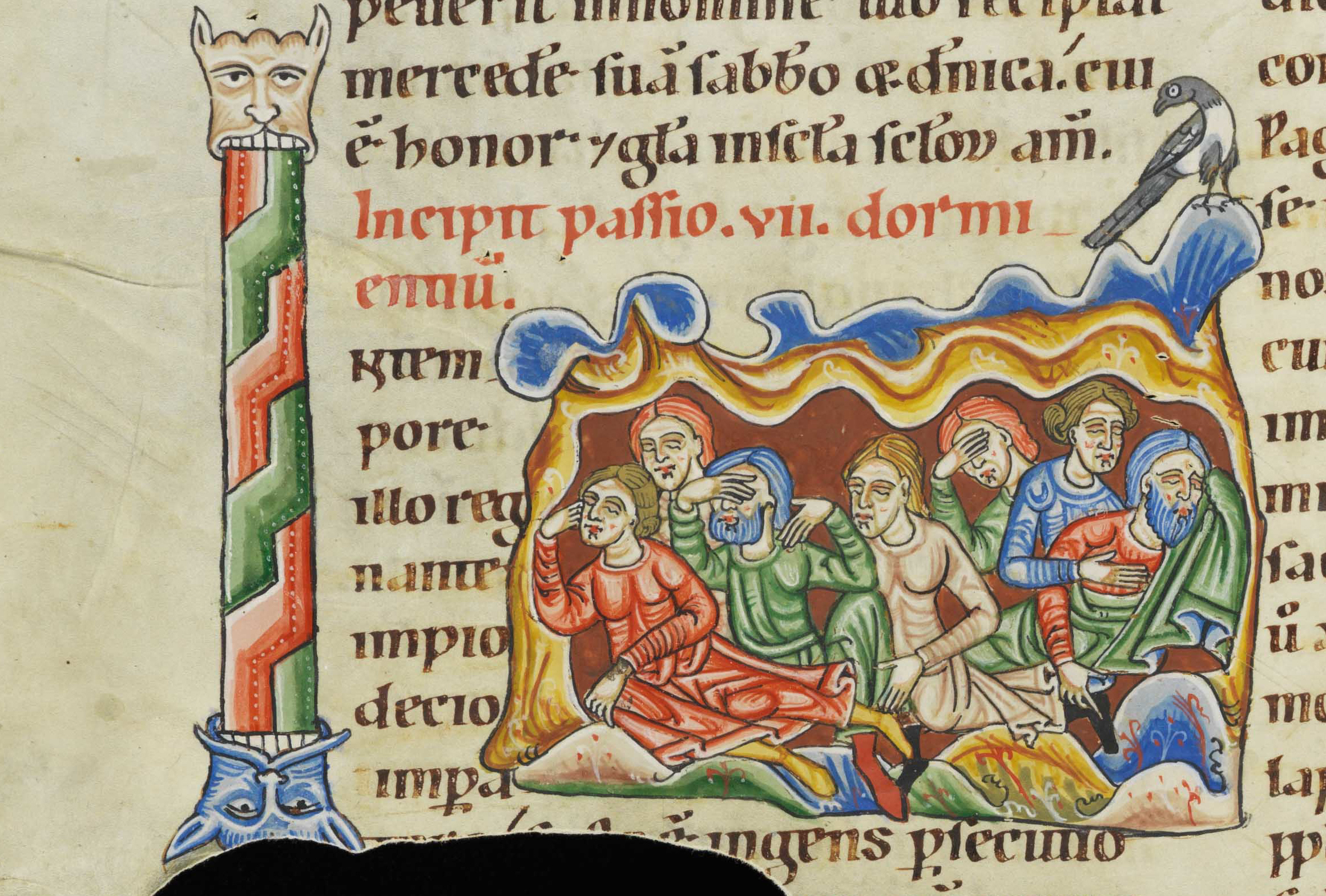
Seven Sleepers of Ephesus, Passionary of Weissenau, Cod. Bodmer 127, c. 1170

Seven Sleepers' Day (German: Siebenschläfertag) on June 27 is a feast day commemorating the legend of the Seven Sleepers as well as one of the best-known bits of traditional weather lore (expressed as a proverb) remaining in German-speaking Europe. The atmospheric conditions on that day are supposed to determine or predict the average summer weather of the next seven weeks.

== Origins ==
The legend of the Seven Sleepers of Ephesus was first presented by Jacob of Serugh around 500 AD and later popularized by Gregory of Tours. Its Western version was part of the widely distributed Golden Legend hagiography collection compiled by Jacobus de Voragine about 1260. The cult became common during the Crusades of the High and Late Middle Ages, and June 27 was declared a commemoration day in most of the Catholic dioceses. Contrary to popular belief, the name of the day does not refer to the edible dormouse (Glis glis), a rodent known as Siebenschläfer in German for its seven-month hibernation.

The story appears in the Qur'an (Surah Al-Kahf 18:26), where they are called "The people of the cave". The Islamic version includes more details such as the mention of a dog, who accompanied the youths into the cave and appears to keep watch. In this version the people slept for 300 years (according to Gregorian calendar) or 309 years according to the lunar calendar.

== Singularity ==
The Seven Sleepers singularity is contested as quite inaccurate in practice. Objections have been raised that the weather lore associated with the day might have arisen before the 1582 Gregorian calendar reform, and as at this time the difference to the Julian calendar amounted to ten days, July 7 would be the actual Seven Sleepers Day. Based on this date the prediction has a slightly increased probability of about 55–70%, if confined to the southern parts of Germany, where the rule seems to have originated. In contrast, the weather lore is not applicable to Northern Germany and its rather oceanic climate.

Depending on the meandering flow of the polar jet stream in the Northern Hemisphere (Rossby waves) and the emergence of veering low-pressure and high-pressure (anticyclone) systems, the atmospheric conditions tend to stabilize in early July: either a high-pressure ridge takes hold over Scandinavia, which may coalesce with the subtropical Azores High to form a stable and warm macro weather situation; or a high North Atlantic oscillation between the Icelandic Low and the Azores High implies a long-standing influx of wet air masses into Central Europe.

Similar weather lore exists referring to Saint John's Day on 24 June, Saint Medardus' Day on 8 June (especially in the Czech Republic and Hungary, but also in France), Saints Gervasius and Protasius on 19 June, the Feast of the Visitation on 2 July (pre-1969 calendar), Seven Brothers' Day on 10 July, and St Swithun's Day on 15 July.

== See also ==
- Groundhog Day, whose weather is supposed to predict the arrival of Spring
- Ice Saints
- National Sleepy Head Day for the holiday in Finland
- Saint Swithun's Day
