= Guerret El Anz =

Guerret El Anz is the time of the year, according to the Berber calendar, between February 14 and February 19.

This period is known by its cruel cold.

== Etymology ==
The word "Guerret" comes from the French word "guerre" which means "war" in English. "El Anz" is an Arabic word which means "goats".

This expression describe the intense cold during this period like a war endured by the goats who are not very resistant to the cold due to their fine skins.

== History ==
In Tunisia, it is usual to say "Tjamber Koul w Gamber" (Arabic: تجمبر كول وقمبر). It is an expression that expresses the need to collect the "oula" and vegetables during "Guerret El Anz".

== See also ==
Ice Saints
