= National Sleepy Head Day =

Yearly celebration in Finland observed 27 July

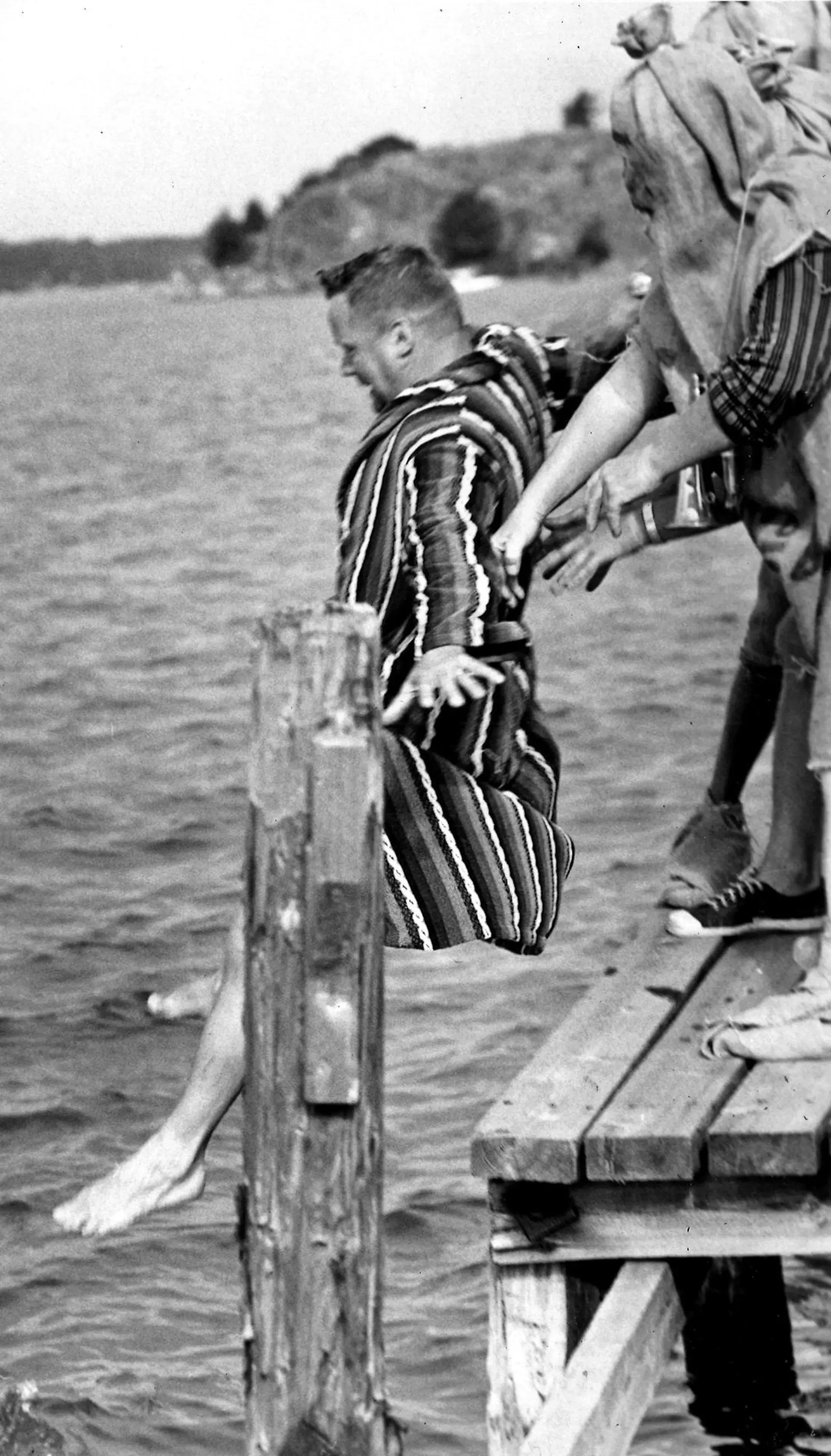
- The National Sleepy Head Day in 1967
- Date: 27 July
- Next time: 27 July 2026
- Frequency: annual

National Sleepy Head Day (Finnish: Unikeonpäivä; Swedish: Sjusovardagen) is a yearly celebration in Finland observed 27 July. This holiday is related to the legend of the Seven Sleepers of Ephesus, but rather than a religious festival, it is more of an informal celebration. The tradition of the Sleepy Head Day traces back to the Middle Ages, when the belief was that the person in the household who slept late on this day would be lazy and unproductive for the rest of the year. In the old days, the last person sleeping in the house (also dubbed as the "laziest") could be woken up by using water, either by being thrown into a lake or the sea, or by having water thrown on them.

In the city of Naantali, a Finnish celebrity is chosen every year to be thrown in the sea from the city's port at 7 a.m. The identity of the sleeper is kept secret until the event. People who are chosen have usually done something to the benefit of the city. Every city mayor has thus far been thrown to the sea at least once, but other sleepers have included the president Tarja Halonen's husband, Dr Pentti Arajärvi, the CEO of Neste Oil Risto Rinne, along with many writers, artists and politicians. The celebrations continue into the evening in Naantali and include activities for people of every age.

== See also ==
- Seven Sleepers Day
- National Accident Day (Finland)
