= Marcel (bishop of Die) =

Catholic bishop of Die from 463 to 510

Marcel was the bishop of Die from 463 until his death in 510.

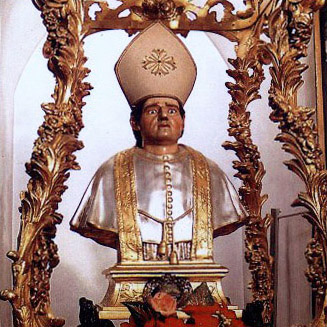
Bust of Saint Marcel in France

In 463, a dispute occurred between Roman and Burgundian clerical authorities. A successor was needed to the vacant Bishopric of Die, which at the time was still under Roman control. By a decree of emperor Leo I, the consecration was supposed to be made by the bishop of the metropolitan Archdiocese of Arles, a man named Leontius. Instead, Mamertus of Vienne, who was located in the Kingdom of the Burgundians, intervened, and put forward Marcel as his own candidate. The situation was reported to Pope Hilarius, and a synod took place in Arles which, on the 25th of February, 464, concluded that may Mamertus repeat such an action, his faculties would be withdrawn.

Despite this resolution, Marcel was accepted as the bishop of Die.
