= National Accident Day (Finland) =

Finnish awareness day about automotive safety

- Observed by: Finland
- Frequency: Annually, on a Friday the 13th (month varies)

National Accident Day (or Accident Day, kansallinen tapaturmapäivä) is a day to raise awareness about automotive safety in the country of Finland. It is chosen to be on Friday the 13th each year and because there is at least one Friday the 13th per year on the modern Gregorian calendar, this is always possible. The event-day was first held in 1995. In 2013, NAD was on 13 September. At that time Finland was experiencing about one million reported accidents, resulting in 2,800 deaths. Accident day is not limited to automotive accidents however, it is also to bring awareness to increasing safety in workplaces. Another place for increased safety awareness is in the home.

The day is promoted by the Finnish Ministry of Social Affairs and Health, which also works with other government and non-government agencies for this event.

In 2016 Finland's National Accident Day occurred on 13 May. The theme for that year was "accidents caused by haste" and there were increased traffic patrols in the weeks prior to the special day. One of the ongoing concerns is the hundreds of pedestrians, cyclists, and moped riders that are injured on the nation's roads. The police focused on pedestrian intersections and they also wanted to monitor motorists' behavior in addition to the pedestrians. One of the Finnish concerns is that pedestrians and cyclists need more awareness when traveling.

Accident Day is not a National Public Holiday of Finland.

== See also ==
- National Sleepy Head Day
- Independence Day (Finland)
- 1978 Finnish Air Force DC-3 crash
