= Pope Hilarius =

Head of the Catholic Church from 461 to 468

Pope Saint Hilarius
- Bishop of Rome
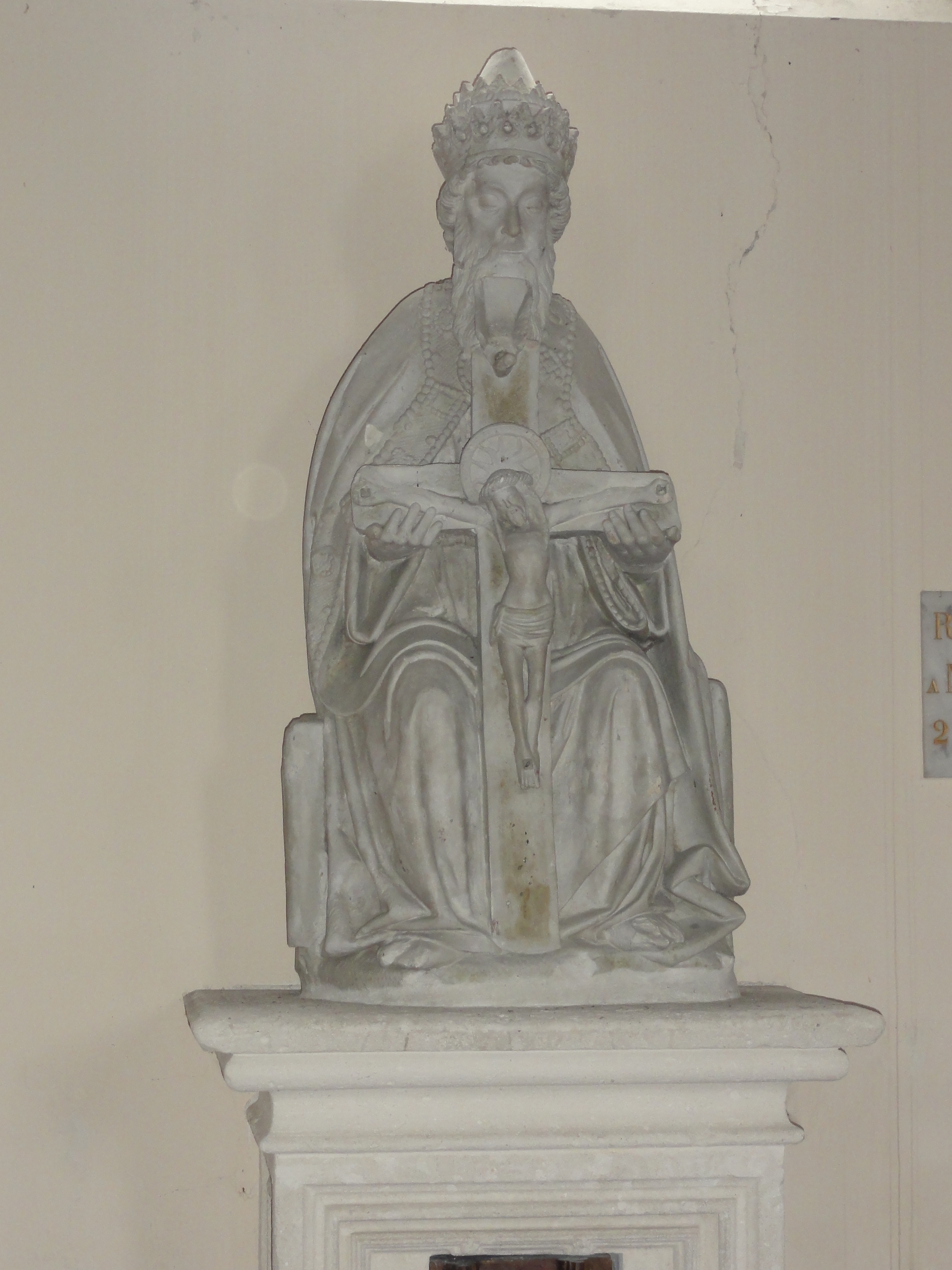
- Statue in the Church of St. Hyginus, Carville-Pot-de-Fer, France
- Church: Catholic Church
- Papacy began: 19 November 461
- Papacy ended: 29 February 468
- Predecessor: Leo I
- Successor: Simplicius

Personal details
- Born: After 395 Sardinia, Sardinia and Corsica, Western Roman Empire
- Died: 29 February 468 Rome, Italy, Western Roman Empire
- Buried: St. Lawrence outside the Walls

Sainthood
- Feast day: 17 November (Roman Catholic); 28 February (Eastern Orthodox)
- Venerated in: Eastern Orthodox Church; Roman Catholic Church

Pope Hilarius (also Hilarus, Hilary; died 29 February 468) was the bishop of Rome from 461 to 468.

In 449, Hilarius served as a legate for Pope Leo I at the Second Council of Ephesus. His opposition to the condemnation of Flavian of Constantinople incurred the enmity of Dioscurus of Alexandria, who attempted to prevent him from leaving the city. Hilarius was able to make his escape and returned to Rome by an indirect route. He later erected an oratory at the Lateran in honor of John the Evangelist, to whom he attributed his safe passage.

Much of his pontificate was spent in maintaining ecclesiastical discipline in conformity with canon law, and in settling jurisdictional disputes among the bishops of both Gaul and Spain.

== Early career ==
Hilarius was born in Sardinia as the son of Crispinus. As archdeacon under Pope Leo I, he fought vigorously for the rights of the Roman See.

In 449, Hilarius and Bishop Julius of Puteoli served as papal legates to the Second Council of Ephesus. Pope Leo had sent a letter with the legates to be read at the council. However, the head notary declared that the emperor's letter should be read first and as the Council proceeded, Leo's letter ended up not being read at all. Hilarius vigorously opposed the condemnation of Flavian of Constantinople, pronouncing the single word in Latin, "Contradicitur", annulling the sentence in Leo's name.

For this he incurred the displeasure of Pope Dioscorus I of Alexandria, who presided over the synod. Flavian died shortly afterwards, on 11 August 449, from injuries incurred from a physical assault by the followers of Dioscurus. According to a letter to Empress Pulcheria collected among the letters of Leo I, Hilarius apologized for not delivering to her the pope's letter after the synod, but owing to Dioscurus of Alexandria, who tried to hinder his going either to Rome or to Constantinople by having Ephesus' roads and docks watched, he had great difficulty in making his escape in order to bring to the pontiff the news of the result of the council. Flavian and Eusebius of Dorylaeum appealed to the pope, and their letters were probably taken by Hilarius to Rome.

== Papacy ==
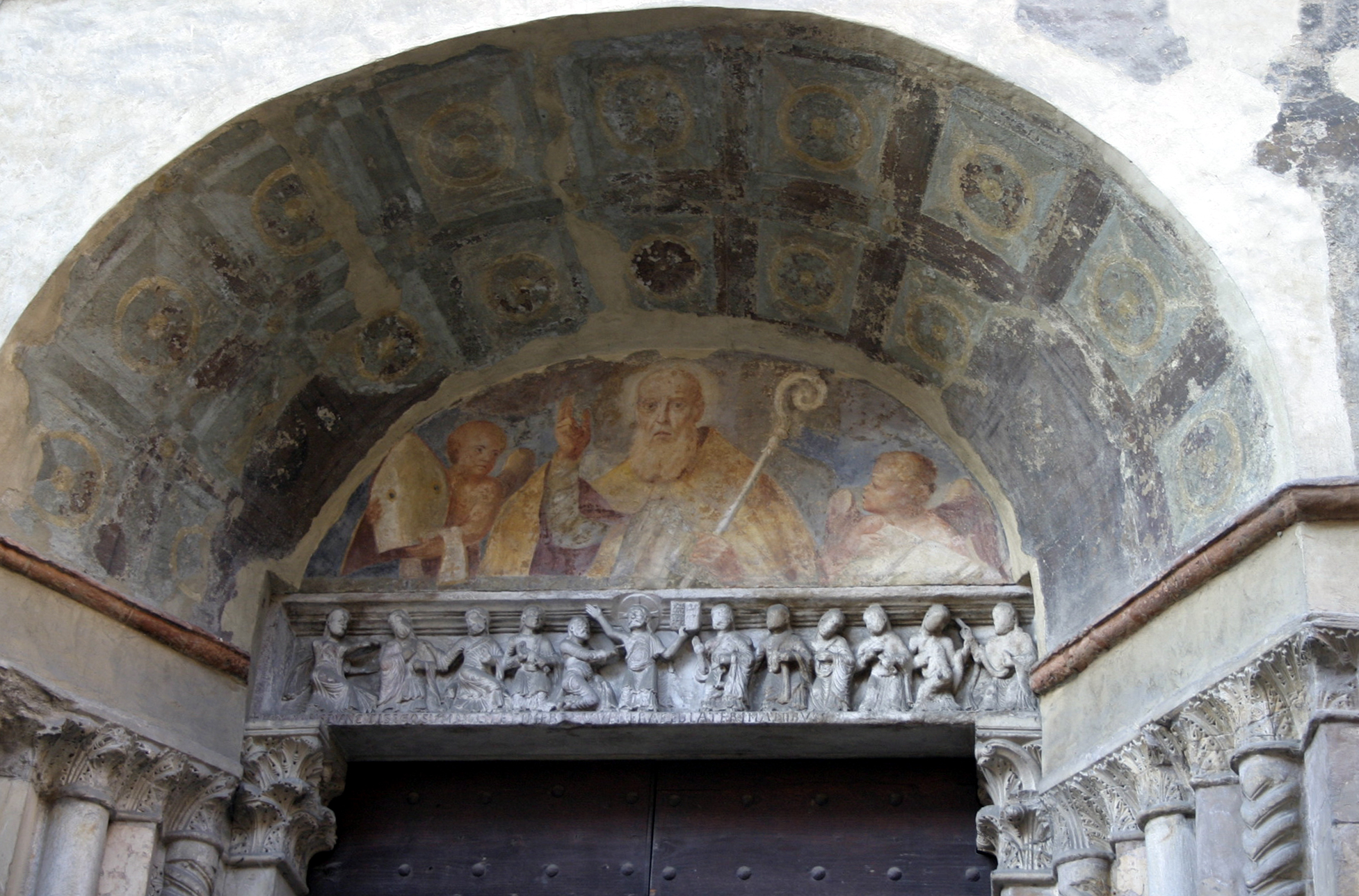
Portrait of Hilarius from a church in Piacenza

As pope, he continued the policy of his predecessor, Leo I, who, in his contest with Hilary of Arles, had obtained from Emperor Valentinian III a famous rescript of 444 (called Novel 17) confirming the supremacy of the bishop of Rome. Hilarius continued to strengthen ecclesiastical government in Gaul and Spain.

In Rome, Hilarius worked zealously to counter the new emperor's 467 edict of toleration for schismatic sects, which had been inspired, according to a letter of Pope Gelasius I, by a favourite of Emperor Anthemius named Philotheus, who espoused the Macedonian heresy. On one of the emperor's visits to St. Peter's Basilica, the pope openly called him to account for his favourite's conduct, exhorting him by the grave of St Peter to promise that he would allow no schismatical assemblies in Rome.

=== Ecclesiastical disputes ===
Hermes, a former archdeacon of Narbonne, had illegally acquired the bishopric of that town. Two Gallican prelates were dispatched to Rome to lay before the pope this and other matters concerning the Church in Gaul. A Roman synod held on 19 November, 462, passed judgment upon these matters. Hilarius sent an Encyclical advising the provincial bishops of Vienne, Lyons, Narbonne, and the Alps that Hermes was to remain titular bishop of Narbonne, but his episcopal faculties were withheld.

Other decisions expressed in an encyclical were in the interests of increased discipline. A synod was to be convened yearly by the bishop of Arles, but all important matters were to be submitted to the Apostolic See. No bishop could leave his diocese without a written permission from his metropolitan, with a right of appeal to the Bishop of Arles. Respecting the parishes (paroeciae) claimed by Bishop Leontius of Arles as belonging to his jurisdiction, the Gallican bishops could decide, after an investigation. Church property could not be alienated until a synod had looked into the purpose of the sale.

Shortly after this, the pope found himself involved in another diocesan quarrel. In 463, Mamertus of Vienne had consecrated Marcel as the bishop of Die, although this Church, by a decree of Leo I, belonged to the metropolitan Diocese of Arles. When Hilarius heard of it, he deputed Leontius of Arles to summon a great synod of the bishops of several provinces to investigate the matter. The synod took place and, on the strength of the report given him by Bishop Antonius, he issued an edict dated 25 February 464 in which Bishop Veranus was commissioned to warn Mamertus that, if in the future he did not refrain from irregular ordinations, his faculties would be withdrawn. Consequently, the consecration of the Bishop of Die would be sanctioned by Leontius of Arles. Thus the primatial privileges of the See of Arles were upheld as Leo I had defined them. At the same time, the bishops were admonished not to overstep their boundaries and to assemble in a yearly synod presided over by the Bishop of Arles. The metropolitan rights of the See of Embrun over the dioceses of the Maritime Alps were protected against the encroachments of a certain Bishop Auxanius, particularly in connection with the two Churches of Nice and Cimiez.

Hilarius gave decisions to the churches of Hispania, which tended to operate outside the papal orbit in the 5th century. Bishop Silvanus of Calahorra had violated the church laws by his episcopal ordinations, and the pope was asked for his decision. Before an answer came to their petition, the same bishops had recourse to the Holy See for an entirely different matter. Before his death, Nundinarius, Bishop of Barcelona, expressed a wish that Irenaeus might be chosen his successor, and he himself had made Irenaeus bishop of another See. The request was granted and the Synod of Tarragona confirmed the nomination of Irenaeus, after which the bishops sought the pope's approval. The Roman synod of 19 November 465, held in the Basilica of Santa Maria Maggiore, which decided that Irenaeus, the nominated bishop, should quit the see of Barcelona and return to his former one, while the Spanish bishops were directed to accept and ignore any issues with the acts of Silvanus. This is the oldest Roman synod whose original records have survived.

=== Construction projects ===
Hilarius erected several churches and other buildings in Rome, for which the Liber Pontificalis, the main source for information about Hilarius, praises him. He also erected a chapel of the Holy Cross in the baptistery, convents, two public baths, and libraries near the Basilica of St. Lawrence outside the Walls. He built two oratories in the baptistery of the Lateran, one in honor of John the Baptist, the other of John the Apostle, to whom he attributed his safe escape from the Council of Ephesus, thus satisfying the question as to which saints the Lateran had been dedicated.

== Death ==
Hilarius died on 29 February 468 and was buried in Basilica of St. Lawrence outside the Walls. His feast day is celebrated on 17 November in the Roman Catholic Church and 28 February in the Eastern Orthodox Church.

== See also ==
- Hilary of Poitiers
- List of Catholic saints
- List of popes
- Pope Saint Hilarius, patron saint archive

== Bibliography ==
- O'Malley, John W. (2010). A History of the Popes, From Peter to the Present. Sheed & Ward.
- Onnis, Omar; Mureddu, Manuelle (2019). Illustres. Vita, morte e miracoli di quaranta personalità sarde (in Italian). Sestu: Domus de Janas. ISBN 978-88-97084-90-7. OCLC 1124656644.

Catholic Church titles
Preceded by Leo I	Pope; 461–468	Succeeded by Simplicius
