= Mamertus =

Bishop of Vienne

Saint Mamertus
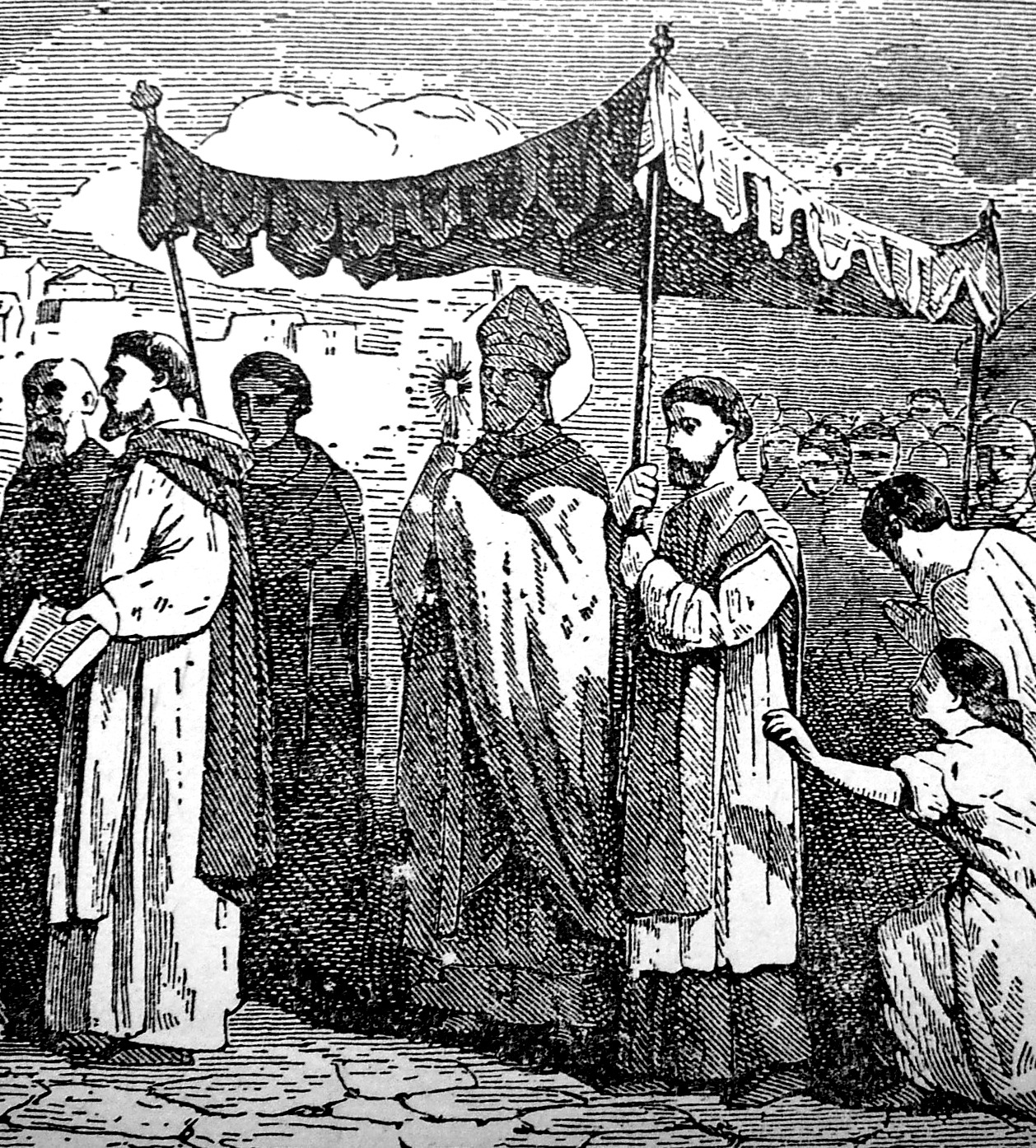
- An engraving of Saint Mamertus from an 1878 book, Little Pictorial Lives of the Saints
- Died: c. AD 475; Arles, Western Roman Empire
- Venerated in: Roman Catholic Church Eastern Orthodox Church
- Feast: 11 May

Mamertus (died c. 475) was the bishop of Vienne in Gaul, venerated as a saint. His primary contribution to ecclesiastical practice was the introduction of litanies prior to Ascension Day as an intercession against earthquakes and other disasters, leading to "Rogation Days." His feast day is the first of the Ice Saints.

== Life ==
Prior to his elevation to the see of Vienne, little has been recorded about Mamertus' life. The fact that his brother, Claudianus Mamertus, the theological writer, received in his youth a sound training in rhetoric, and enjoyed the personal acquaintance of Bishop Eucherius of Lyons (434-50), suggests that the brothers belonged to a wealthy Gallic family from the neighbourhood of Lyons. Like his brother, St Mamertus was distinguished for his secular learning as well as theology, and, before his elevation to the episcopate, appears to have been married.

His election and consecration took place shortly before 462. As bishop he enlisted the services of his brother, who had withdrawn to a cloister, and ordained him priest of Vienne. The activity of the brothers is described in one letter of Sidonius Apollinaris, (Sidonius, Epist., IV, xi) while another is addressed to Bishop Mamertus.

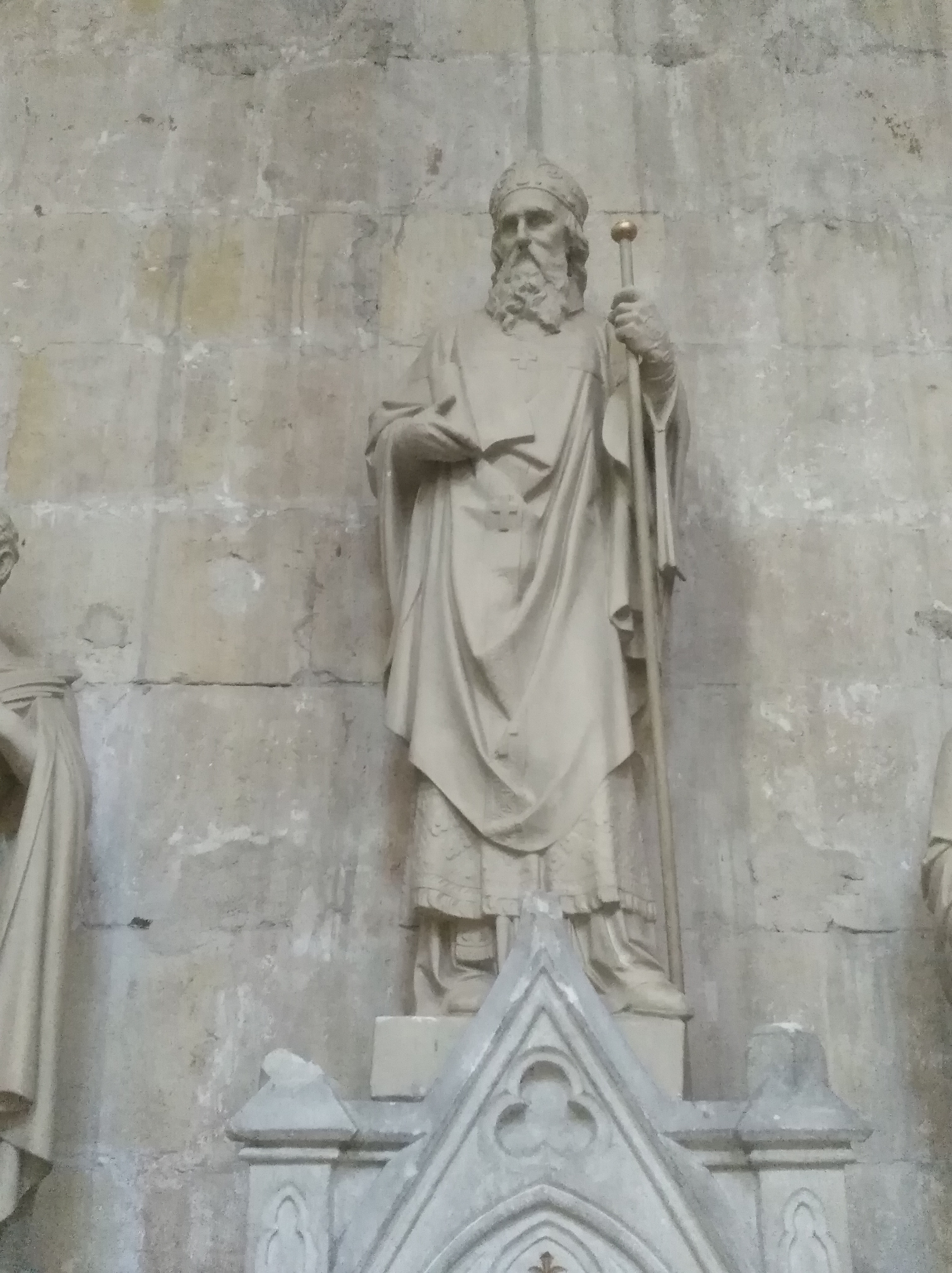
Statue of Saint Mamertus, Vienne Cathedral

In 463, Mamertus was engaged in a dispute with Pope Hilarius on the question of the privileges of the Bishop of Arles. Pope Leo I had regulated the boundaries of the ecclesiastical provinces of Arles and Vienne: under the latter he left the Dioceses of Valence, Tarentaise, Geneva and Grenoble, but all the other dioceses in this district were made subordinate to Arles. Regardless of this decision and infringing on the rights of his colleague of Arles, Mamertus consecrated in 463 a bishop for the city of Die (Dea), a man named Marcel. King Gundioc of the Burgundians complained to Hilarius of this action, whereupon the latter wrote to Bishop Leontius of Arles on 10 October 463, bidding him summon a synod of bishops from the different provinces to enquire into the matter. In a subsequent letter to the bishops of the Roman provinces of Lyons, Vienne, Narbonnensis I and II and Alpina, he also refers to the matter, and directs them to obey Leontius's summons to a regularly constituted synod.

A letter from Hilarius dated 25 February 464 describes the synod's decision against Mamertus. In this letter, Hilarius declared that Mamertus and the bishop unlawfully consecrated by him should really be deposed, but that he would offer clemency. Hilarius therefore commissioned Veranus of Vence to inform Mamertus that, if he did not recognize and submit to the regulations of Pope Leo, he would be deprived also of the four suffragan dioceses, still subject to Vienne. The bishop invalidly installed by Mamertus was to be confirmed in his office by Leontius, after which he might retain the bishopric.

During his episcopate, the remains of Ferreolus were discovered, and were translated by Mamertus to a church in Vienne, built in honour of that martyr.

According to Sidonius Apollinaris, (Sidonius, Epist., V, xiv; VII, i) and Mamertus' second successor, Avitus, ("Homilia de Rogat." in P. L., LIX, 289-94) Bishop Mamertus was the founder of the Minor Rogations Processions, held on Monday to Wednesday preceding Ascension Thursday. The Minor Rogations were traditionally observed with processional litanies and fasting as a petition for good weather for the crops and deliverance from pestilence and famine.

In connexion with these intercessory processions, Mamertus summoned a synod at Vienne between 471 and 475. About 475 he attended a synod at Arles, which dealt with the predestination teaching of Lucidus, a Gallic priest.

William of Auxerre says that Mamertus instituted the litanies after "a plague of wolves. For just as is told in the Gospel, that demons, by God's permission and on account of the sins of men, entered pigs, similarly they entered wolves in order to hurt and kill people better, not only in villages but even in cities."

== Veneration ==
After his death he was venerated as a saint. Saint Mamertus' name stands in the Martyrologium Hieronymianum and in the Martyrologium of Florus of Lyons under 11 May, on which day his liturgical feast day is still celebrated (Henri Quentin, Les martyrologes historiques, 348) in the Roman Catholic Church.
