= Cabañuelas =

Traditional method of weather forecasting

Las cabañuelas (also cavanuelas or cabanuelas) were a method of forecasting the weather practiced throughout the Hispanic diaspora. It is a traditional form of weather prediction dating back many centuries in Spain, though strongly influenced by Native American practises.

== Description ==
Las cabañuelas is practiced throughout Mexico, South America, including the Caribbean, and even in parts of Africa that were previously territories of Spain. In Spain, the self-proclaimed expert cabañuelistas are organized at the Asociación Cultural Española de cabañuelas y Astrometeorología (ACECA). Every year, they report the weather for the coming twelve months.

The cabañuelistas in Spain claim that cabañuelas is "an empirical science" and that its origin is thousands of years old, when the "only reference of the time was the Moon", even the times that Egyptians used to measure the levels of the Nile waters, the Sirius star, and that the old base of cabanuelas was measured beginning August 1.

== Methodology ==
In Northern New Mexico, Puerto Rico, Cuba, Dominican Republic and Venezuela, the cabañuelas were practiced as follows:

- The 31 days of January were carefully observed in order to predict the weather for the rest of the year.
- The first through twelfth days of January represented their corresponding months on the calendar. The thirteenth through twenty-fourth days of January represented the months in reverse, with the thirteenth corresponding to December, the fourteenth corresponding to November, and the twenty-fourth corresponding to January again.
- From the twenty-fifth through thirtieth, the days were divided into two parts, with the morning of the twenty-fifth corresponding to January, and the afternoon of that same day corresponding to February, and so on.
- On the last day of January, the twenty-four hours corresponded each to a month in the same way that the first twenty-four days of the month did. This 31st day of January is regarded with the utmost reverence, with much superstition and importance vested in it.
- The average of the findings would be taken by methodical record-keepers such that, for example, if it rained or snowed on the 7th, 18th, or the 31st at 7:00 a.m. and/or at 6:00 p.m., the cabañuela would show that July would be a wet month.

In the Andes, cabañuelas mixed with indigenous practises, particularly Incan ones. Sacrifices to deities like Pachamama help influence the weather.

== See also ==
- Ember days, certain days in Latin liturgy used in northern Spanish weather lore in a similar way to cabañuelas.
