= Singularity (climate) =

Weather phenomenon occurring around the same time each year

In meteorology, a singularity is a weather phenomenon likely to occur with reasonable regularity around a specific approximate calendar date, outside of more general seasonal weather patterns (e.g., that May Day is usually warmer than New Year's Day in northern locales). The existence of singularities is disputed, some considering them due to seeing patterns in noise and statistical artifacts from small samples.

In North America, the most significant purported singularities are January thaw (warmer weather around January 25) and Indian summer (warmer weather in mid-autumn).

More fanciful ones include the British tradition that rain on St. Swithun's Day (15 July) will be followed by forty days and nights of rain, and similar folk beliefs around Groundhog Day.

== Studies ==
Although folk tales such as St Swithun's Day generally have little credibility, some of these events have a more solid basis. Early scientific investigation involved the creation of calendars of singularities based on temperature and rainfall anomalies. Later and more successful work by Hubert Lamb of the Climatic Research Unit was based on air circulation patterns. Lamb's work analysed the daily frequency of airflow categories between 1898 and 1947. Similar work was carried out by Flohn and Hess in central Europe based on analysis of air flows from 1881 to 1947.

A 1955 study by Liverpool Observatory and Tidal Institute analysed maximum daily temperatures at a single location from 1900 to 1953. This found problems when attempting to demonstrate the statistical significance of apparent temperature anomalies.

In the 1950s, E.G. Bowen suggested that some rainfall calendar singularities might be explicable in terms of meteoric particles from cometary orbits acting as ice nuclei in terrestrial clouds; his theory received support from a number of sources. However, such work has now fallen out of favour due to modern dynamic modelling techniques, although articles are still being written reflecting an interest in the topic.
