= Edward George Bowen =

Welsh physicist (1911–1991)

Edward George Bowen CBE FRS
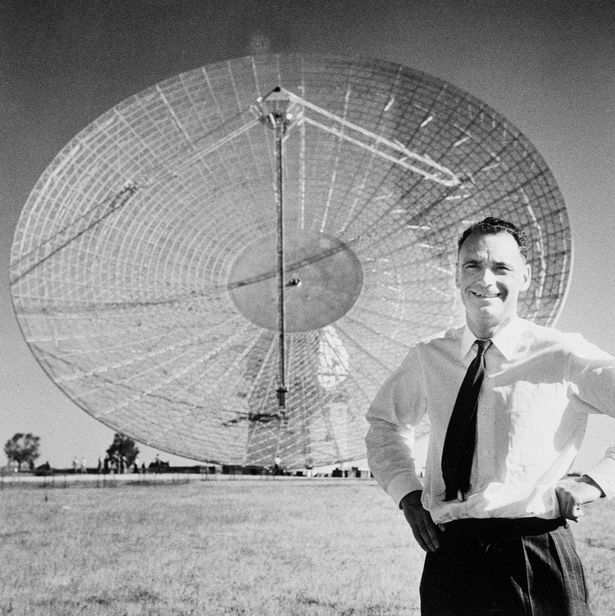
- Edward Bowen at Parkes Observatory, c. 1961
- Born: 14 January 1911; Cockett, Swansea, Wales
- Died: 12 August 1991 (aged 80); Chatswood, New South Wales, Australia
- Education: Swansea University
- Scientific career
- Fields: Radar, astronomy

Edward George "Taffy" Bowen, CBE, FRS (14 January 1911 – 12 August 1991), was a Welsh physicist who made a major contribution to the development of radar. He was also an early radio astronomer, playing a key role in the establishment of radioastronomy in Australia and the United States.

== Early years ==
Edward George Bowen was born at Cockett in Swansea, south Wales, to George Bowen and Ellen Ann (née Owen). George Bowen was a steelworker in a Swansea tinplate works.

From an early age Bowen developed a strong interest in radio and cricket. He entered Swansea University and read physics and related subjects. He graduated with a first-class Honours degree in 1930, and continued with postgraduate research on X-rays and the structure of alloys, earning an MSc in 1931.

He completed his doctorate under professor Edward Victor Appleton at King's College London. As part of his research, Bowen spent a large part of 1933 and 1934 working with a cathode-ray direction finder at the Radio Research Station at Slough, and it was there that he was noticed by Robert Watson-Watt and so came to play a part in the early history of radar. In 1935 he was recruited by Watson-Watt to work in the Radar Development Team as a Junior Scientific Officer.

== Ground-based radar ==
A Committee for the Scientific Study of Air Defence had been established under the chairmanship of Henry Tizard. Before the first meeting of that committee in early 1935, the Government asked Watson-Watt whether an intense beam of radio waves, a "death ray", could bring down an aircraft. Watson-Watt reported that a "death ray" was impracticable, but suggested that radio waves might be used to detect, rather than destroy, enemy aircraft.

After a successful demonstration in February 1935 of the reflection of radio waves by an aircraft, the development of radar went ahead, and a team of five people including Bowen was set up at Orfordness under the cover of doing ionospheric research. Bowen's job was to assemble a transmitter, managing quickly to raise the pulse-power to over 100 kilowatts.

The first detection of an aircraft was made on 17 June 1935 at a range of 17 miles (27 km). By early 1936 after many improvements, aircraft were being detected at ranges of up to 100 miles (160 km). This caused work to be started on a chain of radar stations (Chain Home or CH), initially just covering the approaches to London. The team at Orfordness was enlarged as a result, and in March 1936 a new headquarters was acquired at Bawdsey Manor.

Bowen, at his own request, was moved on to investigating whether radar could be installed in an aircraft. However, Bowen was able to save the day when a demonstration of the new transmitter at Bawdsey Manor failed. Before a disgruntled Sir Hugh Dowding returned to London, Bowen gave him an impromptu demonstration of an experimental radar, built as part of his airborne radar programme, which was detecting the aircraft at ranges of up to 50 miles (80 km). After working through the night, Bowen resurrected the old transmitter at Orford Ness for the following day's demonstration, allowing the Government and RAF to continue with the extension of the chain of coastal stations.

== Airborne radar ==
Installing radar in an aircraft was difficult because of the size and weight of the equipment and the aerial. Furthermore, the equipment had to operate in a vibrating and cold environment. Over the next few years Bowen and his group solved most of these problems. For example, he solved the problem of the power supply in aircraft by using an engine-driven alternator, and he encouraged Imperial Chemical Industries (ICI) to produce the first radio-frequency cables with solid polythene insulation.

Further refinements continued until September 1937, when Bowen gave a dramatic and uninvited demonstration of the application of radar by searching for the British Fleet in the North Sea in poor visibility, detecting three capital ships. Bowen's airborne radar group now had two major projects, one for the detection of ships and the other for interception of aircraft. Bowen also experimented briefly with the use of airborne radar to detect features on the ground, such as towns and coastlines, to aid navigation.

== Second World War ==
On the outbreak of the Second World War, Bowen's unit was moved to St Athan. One of the first things that Bowen did there was to try to detect a submarine by radar. By then, the cavity magnetron had been improved by John Randall and Harry Boot, making airborne radar a powerful tool. By December 1940, operational aircraft were able to detect submarines at up to 15 miles (24 km). This technology had a major effect on winning the Battle of the Atlantic which eventually enabled forces to be built up by sea for the invasion of Europe.

In April 1941, RAF Coastal Command was operating anti-submarine patrols with about 110 aircraft fitted with radar. This increased the detection of submarines both day and night. Few of the attacks were lethal until the introduction in mid-1942 of a powerful searchlight, the Leigh light, that illuminated the submarine. As a result, the U-boats had to recharge their batteries in daylight so that they could at least see the aircraft coming. The radar and the Leigh light cut Allied shipping losses dramatically.

Developments also continued in air interception, and a radar with a narrow rotating beam and plan-position-indicator (PPI) was developed and used by the RAF to direct fighters in October 1940. Early versions of airborne radar were fitted to Blenheims, but had limited minimum and maximum range. In the hands of skilled crews, later versions in 1941 were remarkably effective, and in the heavy night raids of 1941 radar-equipped fighters were the main weapon of air defence. In May 1941, over 100 enemy aircraft were shot down at night using radar, compared with 30 by anti-aircraft guns.

Centimetric contour mapping radars like H2S (British) or H2X (American) greatly improved the accuracy of Allied bombers in the strategic bombing campaign. Centimetric gun-laying radars were much more accurate than the older technology. They made the big-gunned Allied battleships more deadly, and with the newly developed proximity fuse, made anti-aircraft guns more dangerous to attacking aircraft. The anti-aircraft batteries, placed along the German V-1 flying-bomb flight paths to London, are credited with destroying many of the flying bombs before they reached their target.

== Tizard Mission ==
Bowen went to the United States with the Tizard Mission in 1940 and helped to initiate tremendous advances in microwave radar as a weapon. Bowen visited US laboratories and told them about airborne radar and arranged demonstrations. He was able to take an early example of the cavity magnetron. With remarkable speed the US military set up a special laboratory, the MIT Radiation Laboratory for the development of centimetre-wave radar, and Bowen collaborated closely with them on their programme, writing the first draft specification for their first system. The first American experimental airborne 10 cm radar was tested, with Bowen on board, in March 1941, only seven months after the Tizard Mission had arrived.

The Tizard Mission was highly successful almost entirely because of the information provided by Bowen. It helped to establish the alliance between the United States and Britain over a year before the Americans entered the war. The success of collaboration in radar helped to set up channels of communication that would help in other transfers of technology to the United States such as jet engines and nuclear physics.

== Australia ==
In the closing months of 1943, Bowen seemed to be at "loose ends" because his work in the US was virtually finished and the invasion of Europe by the Allies was imminent. Bowen was invited to come to Australia to join the CSIRO Radiophysics Laboratory, and in May 1946, he was appointed Chief of the Division of Radiophysics. Bowen addressed many audiences on the development of radar, its military uses and its potential peacetime applications to civil aviation, marine navigation and surveying.

In addition to developments in radar, Bowen also undertook two other research activities: the pulse method of acceleration of elementary particles; and air navigation that resulted in the Distance Measuring Equipment (DME) that was ultimately adopted by many civil aircraft.

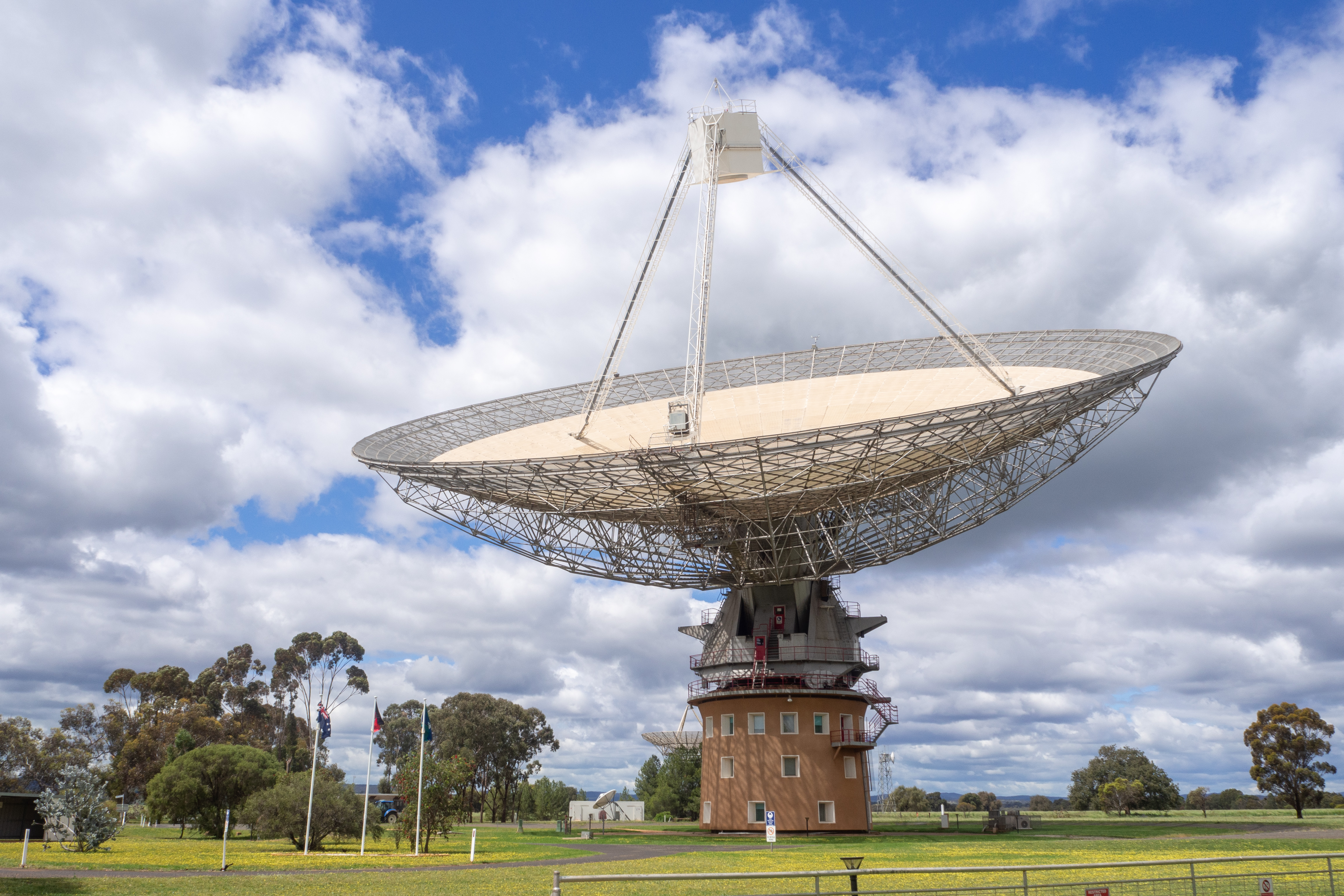
Parkes Observatory's 64 m dish

He also encouraged the new science of radioastronomy and brought about the construction of the 210 ft radio telescope at Parkes, New South Wales. During visits to the US, he met two of his influential contacts during the war, Dr. Vannevar Bush who had become the President of the Carnegie Corporation and Dr. Alfred Loomis who was also a Trustee of the Carnegie Corporation and of the Rockefeller Foundation. He persuaded them in 1954 to fund a large radio telescope in Australia with a grant of $250,000. Bowen in return helped to establish American radio astronomy by seconding Australians to the California Institute of Technology.

Bowen played a key role in the design of the radio telescope at Parkes. At its inauguration in October 1961, he remarked, "...the search for truth is one of the noblest aims of mankind and there is nothing which adds to the glory of the human race or lends it such dignity as the urge to bring the vast complexity of the Universe within the range of human understanding."

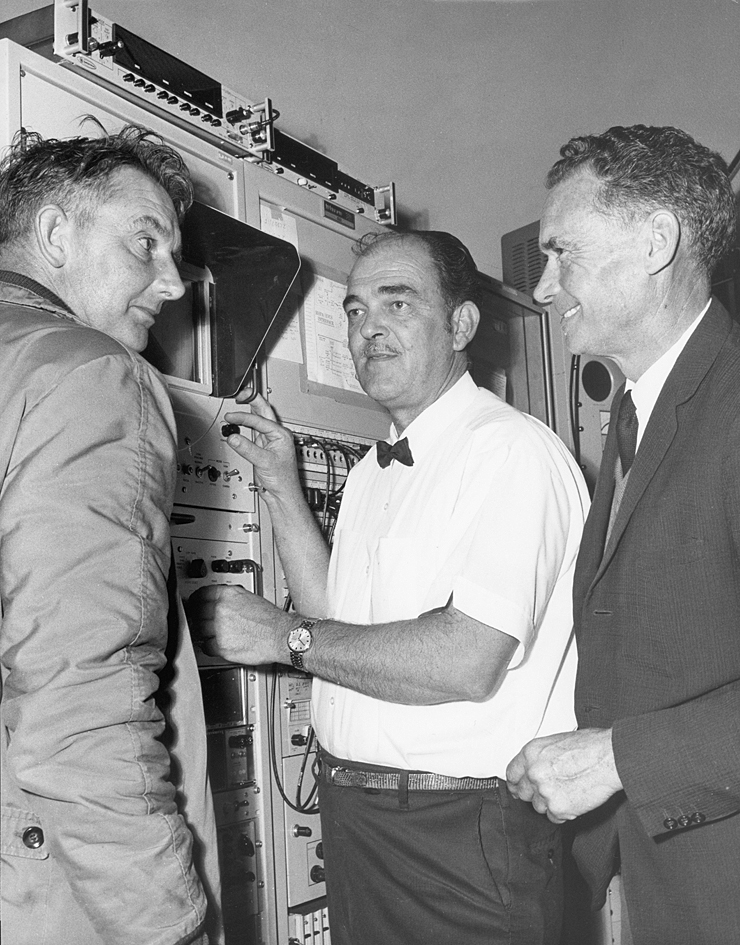
In the Parkes control room during the Apollo 11 mission (l to r) John Bolton (Parkes Observatory Director), Robert Taylor (NASA) and Edward (Taffy) Bowen (Chief, CSIRO Division of Radiophysics).

The Parkes Telescope proved timely for the US space program and tracked many space probes, including the Apollo missions. Later, Bowen played an important role in guiding the optical Anglo-Australian Telescope project during its design phase. This was opened in 1974.

Bowen also instigated rain-making experiments in Australia in 1947, and continued after he retired in 1971. He was also interested in the phenomenon of Climatic Singularities, suggesting that they might be related to the Earth's passage through belts of meteor dust – whose particles then acted as ice-nuclei for seeding clouds.

== Honours ==
Bowen was made an Officer of the Order of the British Empire in 1941, then promoted to Commander in 1962. He was also awarded the American Medal of Freedom in 1947.

He became a fellow of the Australian Academy of Science in 1957 and of the Royal Society in 1975.

== Personal life and death ==
At Swansea University Bowen had met his future wife, Enid Vesta Williams, who was from nearby Neath. They married in 1938, and had three sons: Edward, David and John. Bowen had an enduring love of cricket, and played regularly. He also became a keen sailor.

In December 1987, he suffered a stroke and gradually deteriorated. He died on 12 August 1991 in Chatswood, Sydney, at the age of 80.

== Oral history ==
Bowen was interviewed about his life in 1972 by Hazel de Berg. This recording can be found at the National Library of Australia.
