= Ice Saints =

Weather lore named after a group of saints

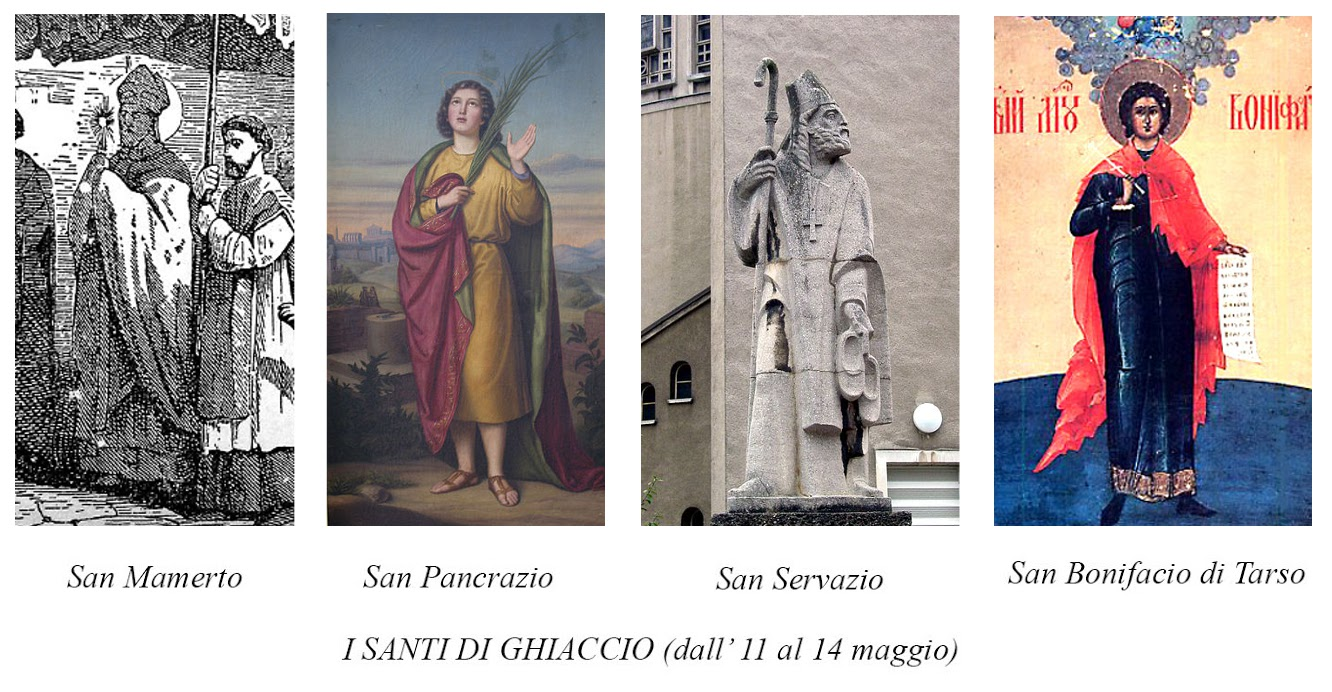
The Ice Saints (Santi di ghiaccio): Mamertus, Pancras, Servatius and Boniface

The Ice Saints are Mamertus, Pancras of Rome, Servatius of Tongeren and Boniface of Tarsus. They are so named because their feast days fall on the days of May 11, May 12, May 13 and May 14 respectively, which often saw the last cold snap of the season. In some countries, only three are included in the Ice Saints, and Sophia of Rome (May 15) can be added in some areas.

In the United Kingdom, the term 'blackthorn winter' is an old phrase originating in rural England to describe a cold period in early spring when blackthorn is in flower.

== Folklore ==
In parts of the Northern Hemisphere, the period from May 11 to May 15 is often believed to bring a brief spell of colder weather in many years, including the last nightly frosts of the spring. Pupils of Galileo confirmed this weather pattern for the years 1655-70 and reported a marked cold snap over the days of the Ice Saints. However, in 1902 William Dines, President of the Royal Meteorological Society, used modern statistical techniques to demonstrate that the Ice Saints were a myth, brought about by selective reporting. A review of Kew Gardens data from 1941 to 1969 showed that May 13 was usually the warmest day of the month, and was followed by a sharp drop in temperature.

It is thought that the tradition originated during the Middle Ages, when it was important for farmers not to sow their crops too early so that the last frost would not destroy the harvest. In southern Germany, many gardeners do not plant until the end of the "Eisheilige", the four successive feast days of the "ice saints" Mamertus, Pancras, Servatius and Boniface, May 11–14. The chilly period ends with "Sophientag" on May 15, named for St. Sophia of Rome. Other names for the late season chill include the Eismänner or "Icemen Days".

== Variations ==
St. Mamertus is not counted amongst the Ice Saints in certain countries (Austria, Northern Italy, Czech Republic, etc.), and St. Boniface of Tarsus, whose feast day is May 14, is one of them in other countries (Flanders, Liguria, Czech Republic, etc.). St. Sophia, nicknamed "Cold Sophia" (German kalte Sophie) on May 15 can be added in Germany, Alsace (France), Poland, etc.

In Poland, the Czech Republic and Slovakia, the Ice Saints are St. Pancras, St. Servatius and St. Boniface of Tarsus (i.e., May 12 to May 14). To the Poles, the trio are known collectively as zimni ogrodnicy (cold gardeners) and are followed by zimna Zośka (cold Sophia) whose feast day falls on May 15. In Czech, the three saints are collectively referred to as "ledoví muži" (ice men or icy men) and St. Sophia is known as "Žofie, ledová žena" (Sophia, the ice woman).

In Sweden, the German legend of the Ice Saints has resulted in the belief that there are special "järnnätter" (Swedish for "iron nights") especially in early June, which are susceptible to frost. The term may have arisen out of a mistranslation of German sources, where the term "Eismänner" (German for "ice men") was read as Eisenmänner (German for "iron men") and their nights. then termed "iron nights", which then became shifted from May to June.

== See also ==
- Seven Sleepers Day
- Weather saints
