= Cold climate =

Cold climate may refer to:

- Polar climate
- Ice cap climate
- Tundra climate
- Alpine climate
- Subarctic climate
- Humid continental climate
