= Apollophanes (disambiguation) =

Apollophanes was a 1st-century BCE king in the area of eastern and central Punjab in modern India and Pakistan.

Apollophanes may also refer to:

== History ==
- Apollophanes of Antioch, stoic philosopher
- Apollophanes of Athens, poet
- Apollophanes of Cyzicus, friend of Persian satrap Pharnabazus II
- Apollophanes of Seleucia, physician to Antiochus the Great in the late 3rd/early 2nd century BCE
- Apollophanes, general of Alexander the Great, who became a satrap and killed during a battle against the Oritians

== Other ==
- Apollophanes, a genus of spider; see Philodromidae
