= Naucrary =

The Naucrary and Naucraria (Ancient Greek: ναυκραρία, romanized: naukraria) was a subdivision of the people of Attica, among the most ancient in the Athenian state. Each was led by an official called a naucrarus (Ancient Greek: ναύκραρος, romanized: naukraros). All sources for the institution date from after it had ceased to be particularly important and thus the nature of the naucraries is highly disputed in modern scholarship. They seem to have played a role in fiscal management and naval organisation.

== Etymology ==
The word is derived either from naus (ναῦς "a ship") and describes the duty imposed upon each naucrary, of providing one ship and two (or, more probably, ten) horsemen; or from naio (ναίω "I dwell"), in which case it has to do with a householder census. The former is generally accepted since the naucraries were certainly the units on which the Athenian fleet was based.

== History ==
The institution was most important in the Archaic period, when they seem to have been key magistrates of local administration. Three ancient sources offer explicit definitions of the naucrary. The second-century BC grammarian, Ammonius of Alexandria states:

naukraroi: those exacting money from the public landholdings, and naukraria: the regions in which the (public) landholdings are located.

— Ammonius of Alexandria

In the ninth-century AD, Lexicon of Photius, the naucrari are defined as

naukraroi: The ancient Athenian term for the modern demarchs. They rented out public (property)

— Photius Lexicon

According to the Aristotelian Constitution of the Athenians (8.3), in the sixth century BC, each of the four Ionian tribes of Athens was divided into three trittyes ("thirds"), each of which was subdivided into four naucraries; there were thus 48 naucraries.

The earliest mention of the term is in Herodotus (v. 71), where it is stated that the Cylonian conspiracy in 632 BC was put down by the "Prytaneis (chief men) of the naucraries."

The Encyclopedia Britannica conjectured that the military forces of Athens were organized on the basis of the naucraries, and that it was the duty of the presidents of these districts to raise the local levies. But it notes that the Athenaion Politeia does not connect the naucrary with the fleet or the army, observing that "from chapter 8 (of the text) it would appear that its importance was chiefly in connection with finance," and concludes:

The naucrary consisted of a number of villages, and was, therefore, a local unit very much in the power of the naucraros, who was selected by reason of wealth. The naucraros superintended the construction of, and afterwards captained, the ship, and also assessed and administered the taxes in his own area.

In the reforms of Cleisthenes, the naucraries gave place to the demes as the political unit. In accordance with the new decimal system, their number was increased to fifty. Whether they continued (and if so, how long) to supply one ship and two (or ten) horsemen each is not certainly known. Cheidemus in Photius asserts that they did, and his statement is to a certain extent corroborated by Herodotus (vi. 89) who records that, in the Aeginetan War before the Persian Invasion, the Athenian fleet numbered only fifty sail.

== See also ==
- Trierarchy
