= Dalmatius (bishop of Cyzicus) =

Dalmatius was the bishop of Cyzicus who attended the Council of Ephesus in 431.

Originally a monk, Dalmatius was elected by the people of Cyzicus, according to canon law, to be their bishop. The Patriarch Sisinnius I of Constantinople, however, had nominated Proclus (who afterwards succeeded to the patriarchal see in 427). Despite the opposition, Dalmatius remained bishop of Cyzicus, for he was present with that title at the council of Ephesus some years later. The story of his disputed election is told by Socrates Scholasticus.

An anonymous 5th-century ecclesiastical historian from Cyzicus, known as the Anonymus Cyzicenus, claims that his father was a priest under Bishop Dalmatius and that as a young man he had read a book about the First Council of Nicaea that was either written or commissioned by Dalmatius. This work is now lost, but the Anonymus's description indicates that it was strongly pro-Nicene and critical of Arianism.

Dalmatius was dead by 449.
