= List of shipwrecks in June 1884 =

The list of shipwrecks in June 1884 includes ships sunk, foundered, grounded, or otherwise lost during June 1884.

== 1 June ==
List of shipwrecks: 1 June 1884
Ship	State	Description
Hadassar	United Kingdom	The schooner ran aground in Totland Bay. She was on a voyage from Dartmouth, Devon to Southampton, Hampshire
Prinz Friedrich Karl	Germany	The steamship collided with the steamship Bahrenfeld (Germany) at Antwerp, Belgium and was beached. Prinz Friedrich Karl was on a voyage from Ergasteria, Ottoman Empire to Antwerp.

== 2 June ==
List of shipwrecks: 2 June 1884
Ship	State	Description
Newark	United Kingdom	The barque was driven ashore on "Princes Island". She was on a voyage from Cardiff, Glamorgan to Batavia, Netherlands East Indies.
Wave	United States	The steamship capsized in the Cape Fear River when she careened going around a bend and her deck cargo shifted. Two passengers and her cook died.

== 3 June ==
List of shipwrecks: 3 June 1884
Ship	State	Description
Nordsoen	Denmark	The steamship suffered an onboard explosion and sank at sea. Her crew were rescued by the steamship Clan Macdonald (United Kingdom). Nordsoen was on a voyage from Cardiff, Glamorgan, United Kingdom to Constantinople, Ottoman Empire.

== 5 June ==
List of shipwrecks: 5 June 1884
Ship	State	Description
Verona	United Kingdom	The steamship caught fire at Hong Kong. The fire was extinguished.

== 6 June ==
List of shipwrecks: 6 June 1884
Ship	State	Description
Amy	United Kingdom	The ship was driven ashore neat Katthammarsvik, Gotland, Sweden. She was on a voyage from Porvoo, Grand Duchy of Finland to a Dutch port.

== 7 June ==
List of shipwrecks: 7 June 1884
Ship	State	Description
Fanny Fern	United States	The fishing schooner was sunk in a collision with Allentown (United States) in Massachusetts Bay. Four crew were killed.

== 9 June ==
List of shipwrecks: 9 June 1884
Ship	State	Description
Ahnapee	United States	The two-masted scow schooner ran aground on the coast of Lake Michigan on Sheboygan, Wisconsin's North Point in a fog. Her crew of six survived. Salvage attempts failed and she was abandoned. Her wreck lies in 0 to 7 feet (0.0 to 2.1 m) of water at 43°47.110′N 087°42.635′W in the Wisconsin Shipwreck Coast National Marine Sanctuary.
Canopus	Germany	The ship was sighted in the Atlantic Ocean whilst on a voyage from the River Tyne to Anjer, Netherlands East Indies. No further trace, reported missing.

== 10 June ==
List of shipwrecks: 10 June 1884
Ship	State	Description
Lionne	France	The fishing vessel was wrecked at Brandal, Iceland. Her crew were rescued by Romanche (French Navy).
Vigor	Norway	The brig was driven ashore at Durban, Natal Colony.

== 13 June ==
List of shipwrecks: 13 June 1884
Ship	State	Description
Larne	United Kingdom	The steamship ran aground in the Saltee Islands, County Wexford and foundered. Her crew survived. She was on a voyage from Milford Haven, Pembrokeshire to "Dunmore".

== 14 June ==
List of shipwrecks: 14 June 1884
Ship	State	Description
Venetia	United Kingdom	The steamship collided with the steamship Foscolino (United Kingdom) and sank 20 nautical miles (37 km) north of Ouessant, Finistère, France with the loss of two of her twenty crew. Venetia was on a voyage from London to Genoa, Italy.
Unnamed	United Kingdom	The smack foundered in Fishguard Bay with the loss of all hands.

== 16 June ==
List of shipwrecks: 16 June 1884
Ship	State	Description
Knight of the Cross	United Kingdom	The tug struck the Long Craig Rock, in the Firth of Forth and was beached at North Queensferry, Fife. Following temporary repairs, she was refloated and taken in to Granton, Lothian.

== 17 June ==
List of shipwrecks: 17 June 1884
Ship	State	Description
Assyrian	United Kingdom	The ship was driven ashore at Hooghly Point, India. She was on a voyage from Philadelphia, Pennsylvania to Calcutta, India. She was refloated and resumed her voyage.

== 18 June ==
List of shipwrecks: 18 June 1884
Ship	State	Description
Ann	United Kingdom	The fishing boat was run into by the steamship Matthew Cay (United Kingdom) with the loss of a crew member. Survivors were rescued by Matthew Cay.

== 19 June ==
List of shipwrecks: 19 June 1884
Ship	State	Description
City of Exeter	United Kingdom	The steamship caught fire at Cardiff, Glamorgan.

== 20 June ==
List of shipwrecks: 20 June 1884
Ship	State	Description
Girdler Lightship	Trinity House	The lightship was run into by the steamship Indus (United Kingdom) and sank. Her crew were rescued by Indus.

== 21 June ==
List of shipwrecks: 21 June 1884
Ship	State	Description
Flying Spray	United Kingdom	The tug sank at Greenock, Renfrewshire. She was refloated on 26 June and placed under repair.
Ingraban	Germany	The ship ran aground at "Leeman", Russia. She was refloated on 24 June but had to be beached.

== 22 June ==
List of shipwrecks: 22 June 1884
Ship	State	Description
Voalant	United Kingdom	The ship foundered off the west coast of the Orkney Islands. Wreckage and a lifebuoy washed ashore.

== 24 June ==
List of shipwrecks: 24 June 1884
Ship	State	Description
Olga	United Kingdom	The yacht was run into by the Mersey Ferry Violet (United Kingdom) and sank at Eastham, Cheshire.

== 25 June ==
List of shipwrecks: 25 June 1884
Ship	State	Description
Helen Burns	United Kingdom	The barque ran aground in the River Tawe. She was refloated with assistance.
Rochester	United Kingdom	The paddle steamer struck the Stag Rock, in Spring Bay, Patagonia, Argentina and sank. Her crew survived.

== 26 June ==
List of shipwrecks: 26 June 1884
Ship	State	Description
Glen Osmond	United Kingdom	The ship collided with the steamship Concordia (United Kingdom) and was severely damaged. Glen Osmond was on a voyage from London to Adelaide, Queensland.
Solway Queen	United Kingdom	The ship ran aground off Skokham Island, Pembrokeshire. She was refloated and beached at Milford Haven, Pembrokeshire.

== 27 June ==
List of shipwrecks: 27 June 1884
Ship	State	Description
Cæsarea	United Kingdom	The steamship collided with the steamship Strathesk (United Kingdom) and sank 15 nautical miles (28 km) off Cap La Hougue, Manche, France with the loss of one of the 35 people on board. Survivors were rescued by Strathesk. Cæsarea was on a voyage from Southampton, Hampshire to Saint-Malo, Ille-et-Vilaine, France.

== 29 June ==
List of shipwrecks: 29 June 1884
Ship	State	Description
Daswinton	Flag unknown	The ship was destroyed by fire at Valparaíso, Chile.

== 30 June ==
List of shipwrecks: 30 June 1884
Ship	State	Description
River Avon	United Kingdom	The steamship was wrecked on a reef off Boa Vista Island, Cape Verde Islands. She was on a voyage from Newport, Monmouthshire to Talcahuano, Chile.

== Unknown date ==
List of shipwrecks: Unknown date in June 1884
Ship	State	Description
Alava	Spain	The steamship was driven ashore at Saint John, New Brunswick, Canada.
Angeleta	Spain	The ship caught fire at sea. Her nineteen crew were rescued by the barque Pipalarno (Italy).
Bermuda	Canada	The steamship was driven ashore at Amagansett, New York. She was on a voyage from Saint Kitts to New York City.
Buitron	United Kingdom	The steamship ran aground on the Norrskar Rock. She was on a voyage from Middlesbrough, Yorkshire to Vaasa, Grand Duchy of Finland.
C. H. T. Brothers	United Kingdom	The fishing boat was abandoned in the North Sea 20 nautical miles (37 km) off Fraserburg, Aberdeenshire.
Claudius and Seyn	Flag unknown	The steamship was driven ashore at Bilbao, Spain. She was later refloated.
Dawn	United Kingdom	The steamship was wrecked on the Hogsty Reef, Bahamas. Her sixteen crew survived. She was on a voyage from Baracoa, Cuba to New York City.
Deak	United Kingdom	The steamship was driven ashore at Kingston, Jamaica. She was on a voyage from Glasgow, Renfrewshire to Kingston. She was refloated and taken in to Kingston.
Elna	Denmark	The brig was lost on the coast of Greenland. She was on a voyage from South Shields, County Durham, United Kingdom to Ivigtût, Greenland.
James Shaw	United Kingdom	The ship was driven ashore near Hudiksvall, Sweden. She was refloated and taken in to Stockholm in a leaky condition.
Klep	Russia	The ship was driven ashore at "Sondrerose". She was on a voyage from South Shields to Saint Petersburg. She was refloated and taken in to Copenhagen, Denmark.
Lauras	Italy	The barque was wrecked at Valparaíso, Chile. Her crew were rescued.
Lovaine	United Kingdom	The steamship ran aground in Lough Foyle. She was on a voyage from Baltimore, Maryland, United States to Londonderry. She was refloated on 24 June and completed her voyage.
Marcello	Italy	The barque put in to Cape Town, Cape Colony on fire. She was on a voyage from South Shields to Java, Netherlands East Indies.
Marlborough	United Kingdom	The steamship was driven ashore at Hainan Head, China. She was on a voyage from Saigon, French Indo-China to Hong Kong.
Mary Darkee	United Kingdom	The barque ran aground at Amherst Harbour, Magdalen Islands, Quebec, Canada.
Rougemont	United Kingdom	The steamship ran aground on the Sorrelle Rocks, off Cape Negro, French Tunisia.
Roebuck	United Kingdom	The steamship was driven ashore in the Sfântu Gheorge branch of the Danube. She was refloated with assistance and taken in to Sulina, Romania.
Sir William Armstrong	United Kingdom	The steamship was driven ashore at Dungeness, Kent. She was on a voyage from Havre de Grâce, Seine-Inférieure, France to Hull, Yorkshire. She was refloated on 2 July.
Umatilla	United States	The ship sank in Esquimalt Harbour, British Columbia, Canada.
Uncas	United Kingdom	The barque was wrecked. Her crew were rescued. She was on a voyage from Swansea, Glamorgan to Valparaíso, Chile.
Veranda	United Kingdom	The ship was driven ashore. She was on a voyage from Kronstadt to Hartlepool, County Durham. She had been refloated by 1 July.
Wawbeck	United Kingdom	The ship was abandoned in the Atlantic Ocean before 12 June.
Welcome Home	United Kingdom	The fishing boat was wrecked on the Ballymacaw Rocks, on the coast of County Waterford. Her crew were rescued.
Xantho	United Kingdom	The steamship collided with the steamship Valuta (Germany) and sank in the Baltic Sea. Her crew were rescued. Xantho was on a voyage from Kronstadt, Russia to Hull.
Zio Battista	Italy	The ship was driven ashore in a hurricane at Philadelphia, Pennsylvania, United States. She was later refloated with assistance.
Unnamed	United States	The lighter sank in a hurricane at Philadelphia.
