= Hadrianotherae =

Town of ancient Mysia

Coordinates: 39°36′24″N 27°54′38″E

Hadrianotherae or Hadrianutherae or Hadrianoutherai (Ancient Greek: Ἁδριανοῦ Θῆραι; "Hadrian's Hunt") was a town of ancient Mysia, on the road from Ergasteria to Miletopolis. It was built by the emperor Hadrian to commemorate a successful hunt which he had had in the neighbourhood. Coins from this town issued during the reign of Hadrian onwards are preserved. It seems to have been a place of some note; for it was the see of a bishop, and on its coins a senate is mentioned. No longer a residential see, it remains a titular see of the Roman Catholic Church.

Its site is located near Balıkesir in Asiatic Turkey.
