= Diocese of Oca (Asia Minor) =

Roman Catholic titular see

Oca is an ancient city and bishopric in present-day Anatolia (Asiatic Turkey), restored as a Latin titular see.

Its site is located in Biga district of Çanakkale Province.

== Ancient history ==
Oca was a city in the Roman province of Hellespontus, in Asia Minor.

It was a bishopric, suffragan of the Metropolitan Archdiocese of Cyzicus.

== Titular see ==
It was nominally restored as a Latin titular bishopric of the lowest (Episcopal) rank in 1933.

No incumbents are recorded yet.

== See also ==
- Mysia

== Sources and external links ==
- GigaCatholic - data for all sections
