= Androsthenes of Cyzicus =

Androsthenes of Cyzicus (Ancient Greek: Ἀνδρόσθενης) was a Greek from the city of Cyzicus in Asia Minor, who lived around 200 BCE. He accompanied Antiochus III the Great to India in 206 BCE. He is mentioned by Polybius who describes how Antiochus, following in the steps of Alexander, crossed into the Kabul valley, received presents from the Indian king Sophagasenus and returned west by way of Seistan and Kerman (206/5). Androthenes brought back the presents from the Indian king.

According to Polybius:

"He crossed the Caucasus (Hindu Kush) and descended into India; renewed his friendship with Sophagasenus the king of the Indians; received more elephants, until he had a hundred and fifty altogether; and having once more provisioned his troops, set out again personally with his army: leaving Androsthenes of Cyzicus the duty of taking home the treasure which this king had agreed to hand over to him." – Polybius 11.39

== Sources ==
- Kosmin, Paul J. (2014), The Land of the Elephant Kings: Space, Territory, and Ideology in Seleucid Empire, Harvard University Press, ISBN 978-0-674-72882-0
