= Androcydes (painter) =

Greek painter

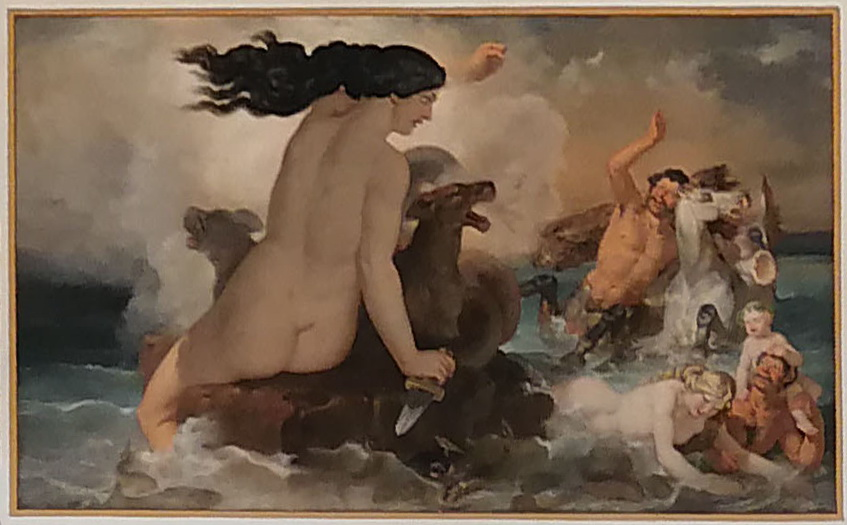
"Scylla" by Androcydes. 19th-century reconstruction in Hermitage by Johann Georg Hiltensperger

Androcydes (or Androkydes) (Ancient Greek: Ἀνδροκύδης) of Cyzicus was a Greek painter of the 4th century BC, whose Battle of Plataea became involved in a political controversy. Plutarch's remarks concerning this work are of interest to art historians who study history painting as a genre.

According to Plutarch, Androcydes received a commission from the city of Thebes to paint the battle scene on site. During this period (382–379 BC), the Theban oligarchy had allied with Sparta. When the Spartans were defeated in 379, the work remained unfinished. It was confiscated and dedicated to commemorate a minor skirmish at Plataea, probably in 370, before the Battle of Leuctra. Originally, the work was to have honored Pelopidas and Epaminondas, but through the efforts of a certain Menecleides, the name of the Theban commander Charon was substituted, either directly in the painting or on a separate dedicatory plaque.

This repurposing indicates that battle scenes might be depicted so generically that the ostensible subject of the work could be changed simply by giving it a new title and name labels. Although no longer extant, it is the only painting of a cavalry battle known to predate that of Euphranor.

Indicative of an interest also in genre painting, Athenaeus reports that Androcydes' gourmet passion for seafood prompted him to devote inordinate attention to painting the fish around a central figure of Scylla in one of his works.
