= Cyzicus =

Ancient town in Erdek, Balıkesir Province, Turkey

- Κύζικος (Ancient Greek)
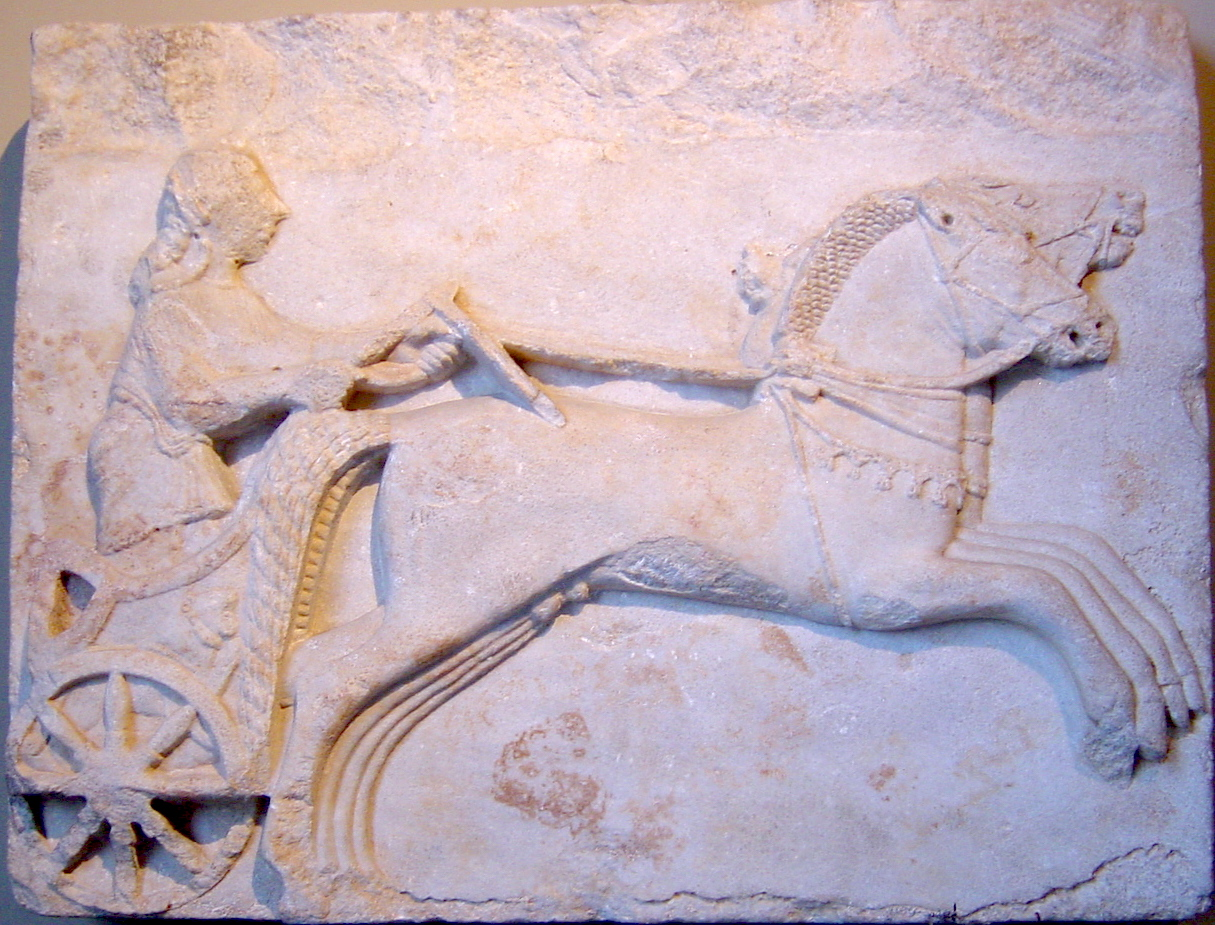
- Bas relief of a charioteer, late 6th century BC

- Location within Turkey
- 40°23′16″N 27°52′14″E
- Type: Settlement
- Periods: Archaic Greek to High Medieval
- Cultures: Greek, Ancient Roman, Byzantine
- Location: Erdek, Balıkesir Province, Turkey
- Region: Mysia

History
- Built by: Pelasgian settlers
- Abandoned: 11th century AD
- Event: Siege of Cyzicus

Cyzicus (/ˈsɪzɪkəs/ SIZ-ik-əs; Ancient Greek: Κύζικος, romanized: Kúzikos; was an ancient Greek town in Mysia in Anatolia in the current Balıkesir Province of Turkey. It was located on the shoreward side of the present Kapıdağ Peninsula (the classical Arctonnesus), a tombolo which is said to have originally been an island in the Sea of Marmara only to be connected to the mainland in historic times either by artificial means or an earthquake.

The site of Cyzicus, located on the Erdek and Bandırma roads, is protected by Turkey's Ministry of Culture.

== History ==
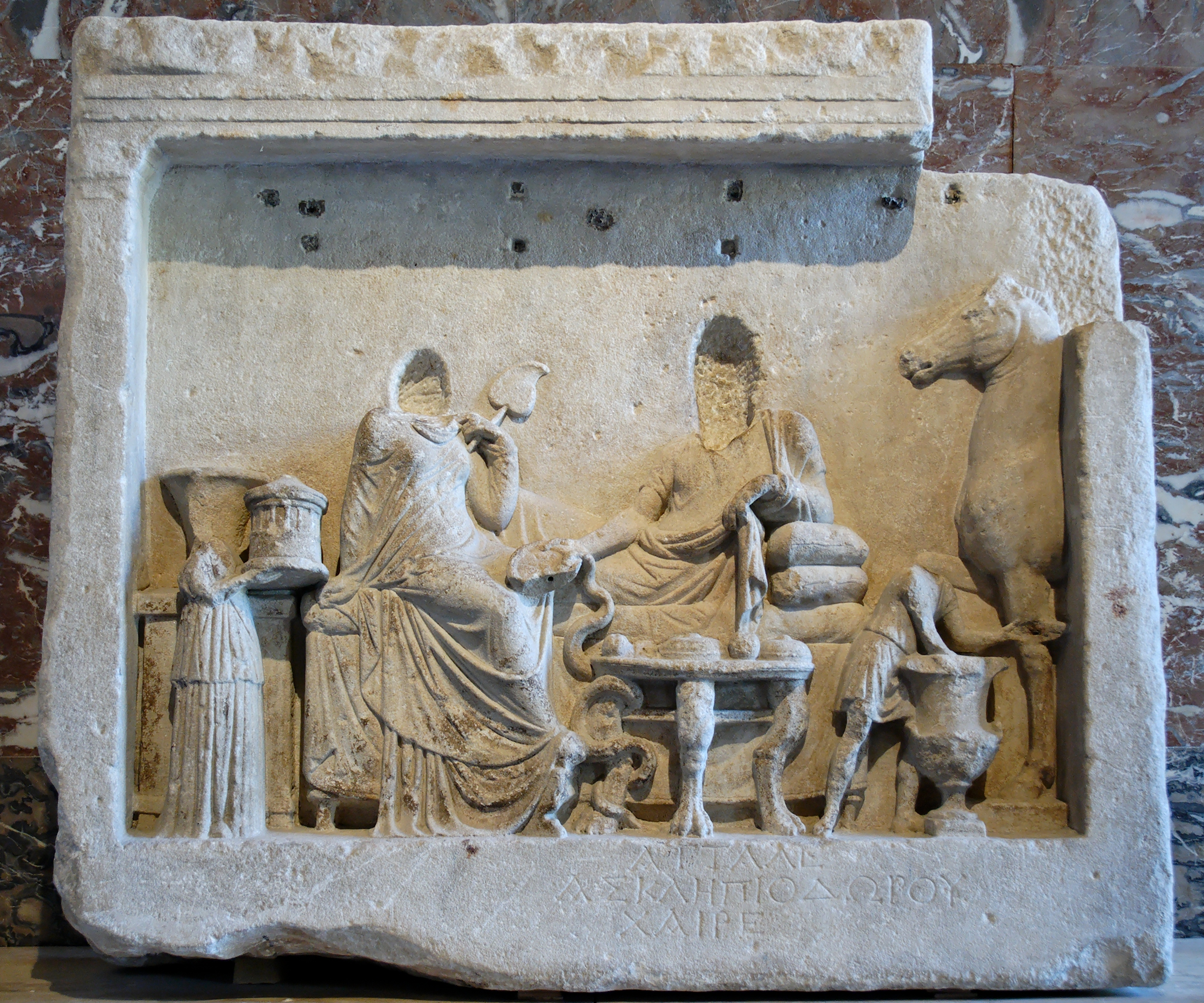
Marble, 2nd quarter of the 2nd century BC. From Cyzicus

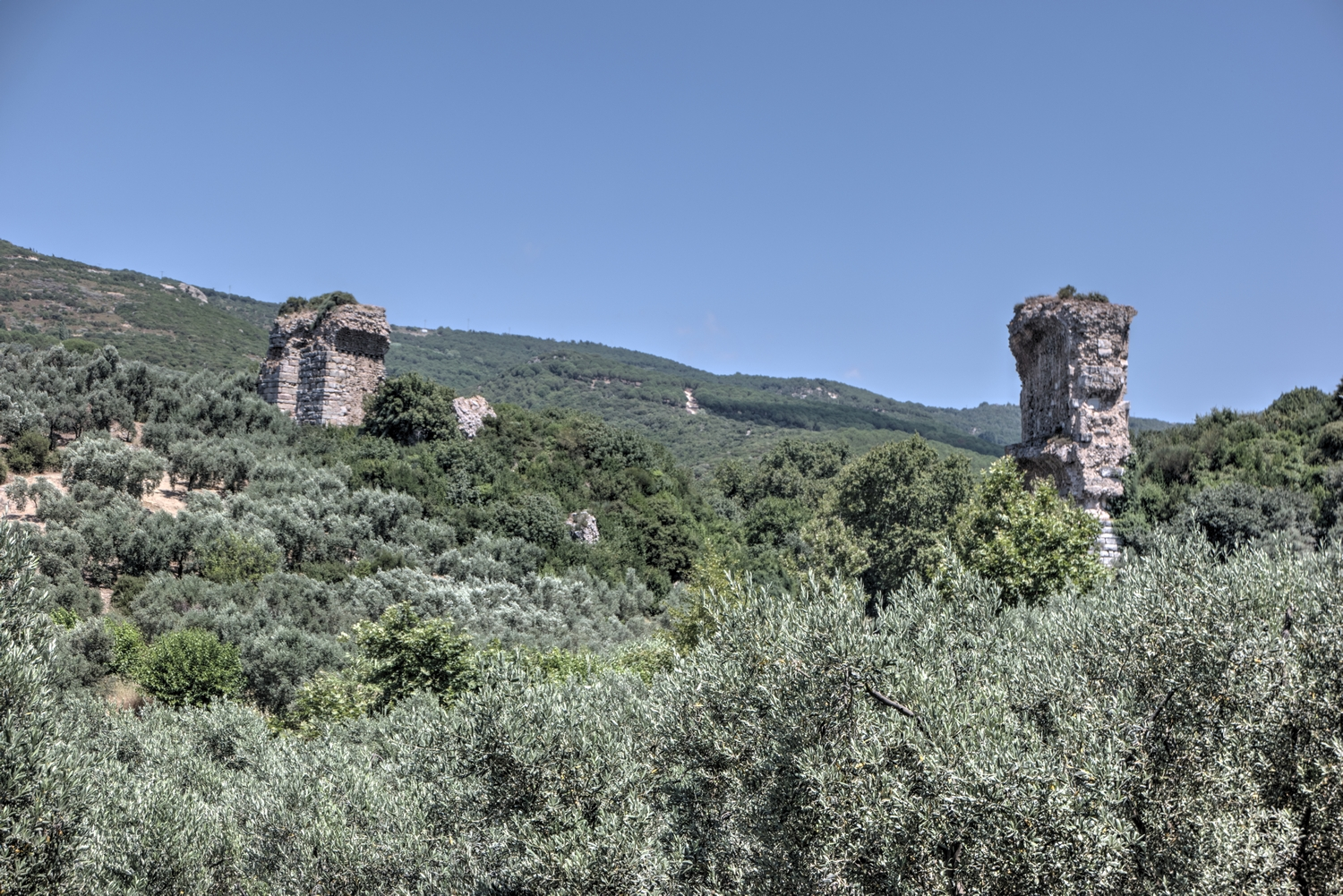
Cyzicus ruins in Turkey

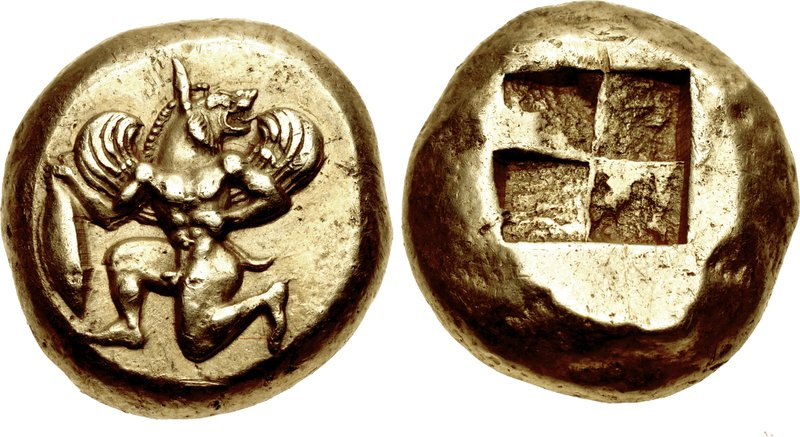
Coin of Kyzikos, Mysia. Circa 550–500 BC

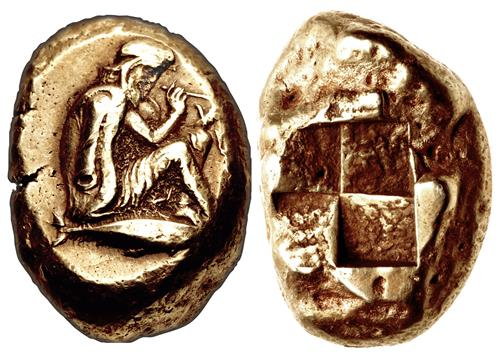
Coin of Cyzicus, minted in the Achaemenid Persian Empire. Obv: bearded Persian archer, testing arrow held in right hand, left hand holding bow, seated on a tunny. Rev: Quadripartite incuse square. According to some numismatists, the archer may represent Pharnabazus II. The representation of the archer later became the canonical form used on the drachms of the Parthian Empire

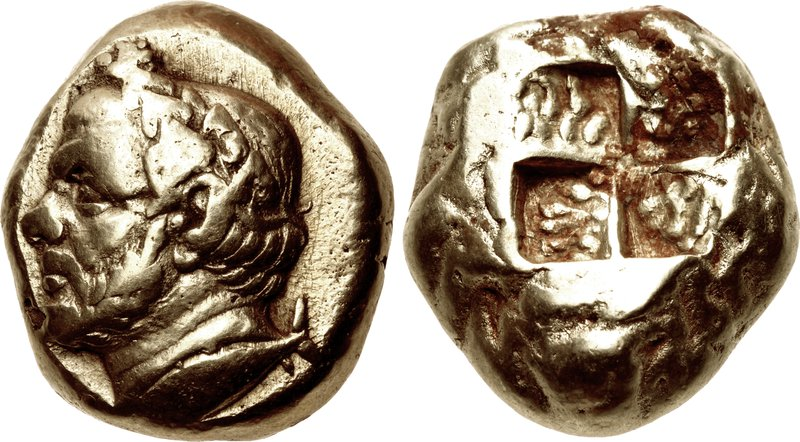
Electrum stater of Cyzicus, mid 4th century BC. On the obverse is a possible portrait of Timotheos, wearing a victory wreath, with a tuna fish below.

Ancient Greek Coin from Cyzicus dated circa 390–341/0 BC

=== Ancient ===
The city was said to have been founded by Pelasgians from Thessaly, according to tradition at the coming of the Argonauts; later it received many colonies from Miletus, allegedly in 756 BC, but its importance began near the end of the Peloponnesian War when the conflict centered on the sea routes connecting Greece to the Black Sea. At this time, the cities of Athens and Miletus diminished in importance while Cyzicus began to prosper. Commander of the Athenian fleet Alcibiades defeated the Spartan fleet in a major naval engagement near Cyzicus known as the Battle of Cyzicus in 410 BC. Famed ancient philosopher Eudoxus of Cnidus established a school at Cyzicus and went with his pupils to Athens, visiting Plato. Later he returned to Anatolia to his hometown of Cnidus, and died circa 350 BC. The era of Olympiads in Cyzicus was reckoned from 135 or 139.

Owing to its advantageous position it speedily acquired commercial importance, and the gold staters of Cyzicus were a staple currency in the ancient world till they were superseded by those of Philip of Macedon. Its unique and characteristic coin, the cyzicenus, was worth 28 drachmae.

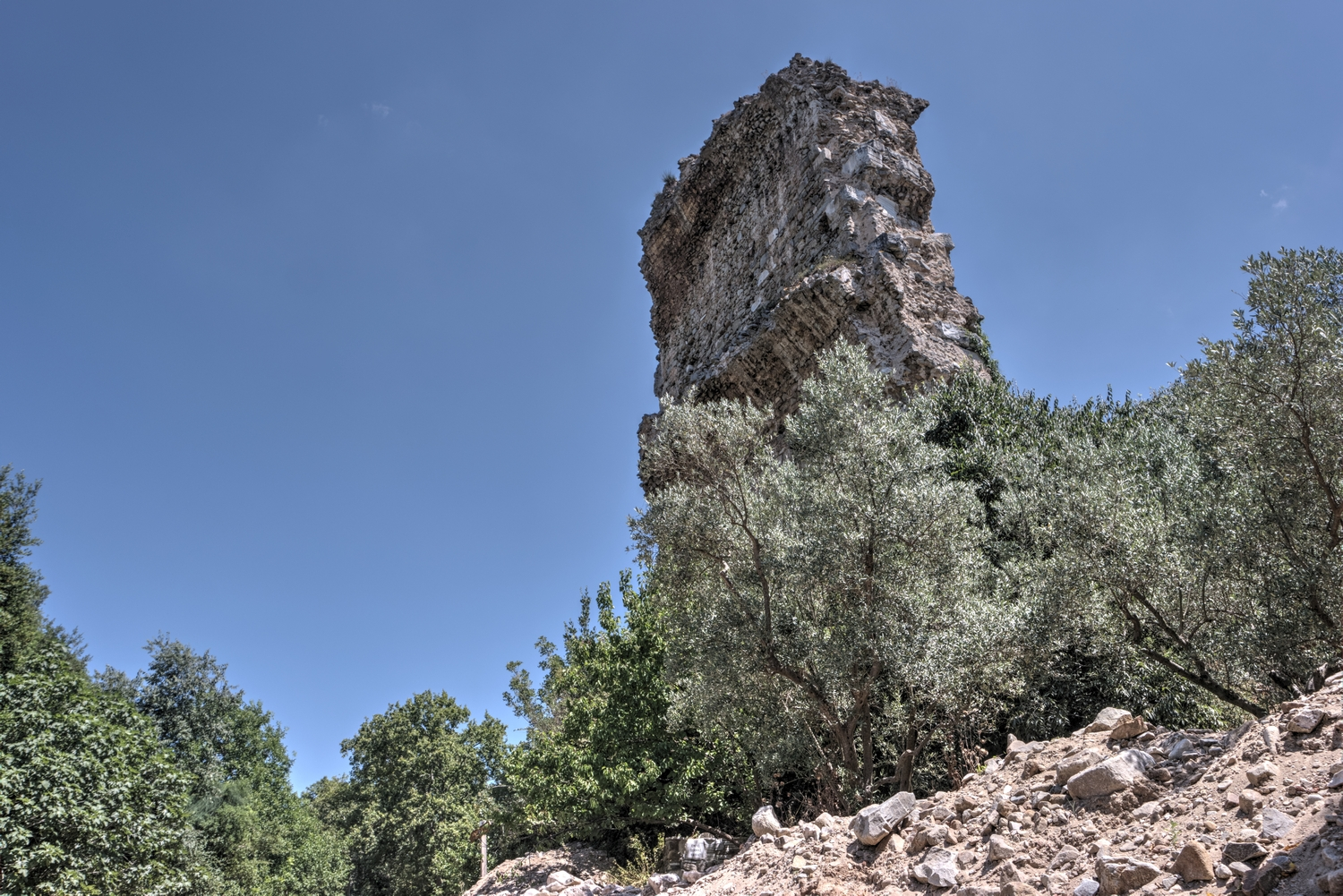
Cyzicus amphitheatre

During the Peloponnesian War (431–404 BC) Cyzicus was subject to the Athenians and Lacedaemonians alternately. In the naval Battle of Cyzicus in 410 during the Peloponnesian War, an Athenian fleet routed and completely destroyed a Spartan fleet. At the peace of Antalcidas (387 BC), like the other Greek cities in Asia, it was made over to Persia. Alexander the Great later captured it from the Persians in 334 BC and was later claimed to be responsible for connecting the island to the mainland.

The history of the town in Hellenistic times is closely connected with that of the Attalids of Pergamon, with whose extinction it came into direct relations with Rome. Cyzicus was held for the Romans against King Mithridates VI of Pontus who besieged it with 300,000 men in 74 BC, the Siege of Cyzicus, but it withstood him stoutly, and the siege was raised by Lucullus: the loyalty of the city was rewarded by an extension of territory and other privileges. The Romans favored it and recognized its municipal independence. Cyzicus was the leading city of Northern Mysia as far as Troas.

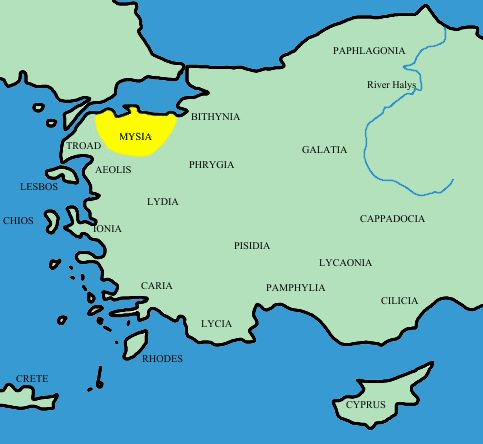
Cyzicus was a town of Mysia

Under Tiberius, it was incorporated into the Roman Empire but remained the capital of Mysia (afterwards, Hellespontus) and became one of the great cities of the ancient world.

There was a women's cult at Cyzicus worshiping the goddess Artemis, which was called Dolon (Δόλων).

=== Medieval ===
Cyzicus was captured temporarily by the Arabs led by Muawiyah I in AD 675. It appears to have been ruined by a series of earthquakes beginning in 443, with the last in 1063. Although its population was transferred to Artake before the 13th century when the peninsula was occupied by the Crusaders, in 1324 the metropolitan of Cyzicus was one of three sees in Anatolia which was able to contribute a temporary annual subsidy to the Patriarchate of Constantinople. Following its conquest by the Ottomans it underwent hard times. From a point between 1370 and 1372 until 1387, the metropolitan was empty; Speros Vryonis speculates this was due to financial difficulties. Later in the 14th century, the sees of Chalcedon and certain patriarchal possessions in Bithynia and Hellespont were bestowed on the metropolitan of Cyzicus.

In the Ottoman era, it was part of the kaza of Erdek in the province of Brusa.

== Ecclesiastical history ==
Cyzicus, as capital of the Roman province of Hellespontus, was its ecclesiastical metropolitan see. In the Notitiae Episcopatuum of Pseudo-Epiphanius, composed in about 640, Cyzicus had 12 suffragan sees; Abydus, Baris in Hellesponto (between Sariköy and Biga), Dardanus, Germa in Hellesponto (ruins of Germaslu, Kirmasti, Girmas), Hadrianotherae (Uzuncia yayla), Ilium, Lampsacus, Miletopolis, Oca, Pionia (Avcılar), Poemanenum (Eskimanias), Troas. The province also included two autocephalous archiepiscopal sees: Parium and Proconnesus.

After the Ottoman conquest of the region, Cyzicus faced such major decline, that in 1347 it received the diocese of Ganos, as to better cover its own expenses. In 1370 and in 1372 the seat remained without a Metropolitan until 1381. In 1387, when a new Metropolitan assumed the see, he received the diocese of Chalcedon, along with its treasury in Constantinople. Cyzicus also received some additional possessions of the Patriarchate in Bithynia and the Hellespont, as to keep the metropolitanate functioning.

=== Residential bishops ===
Cyzicus had a catalogue of bishops beginning with the 1st century; Michel Le Quien mentions fifty-nine. A more complete list is found in Nicodemos, in the Greek "Office of St. Emilian" (Constantinople, 1876), 34–36, which has eighty-five names. Of particular importance are the famous Arian theologian Eunomius of Cyzicus; Saint Dalmatius; Caesar Basiliscus; bishops Proclus and Germanus, who became Patriarchs of Constantinople; and Saint Emilian, a martyr in the 8th century. Another saint who came from Cyzicus, Saint Tryphaena of Cyzicus, is the patron saint of the city. Gelasius, a historian of Arianism, who wrote about 475, was born at Cyzicus.

- Diogenes, Metropolitan of Cyzicus before 449 and after 451
- Constantine Stilbes, Metropolitan of Cyzicus in ca. 1204
- George Kleidas, Metropolitan of Cyzicus in ca. 1253–61
- Theodore Skoutariotes, Metropolitan of Cyzicus in ca. 1277
- Daniel Glykys, Metropolitan of Cyzicus in 1285–89
- Methodius, Metropolitan of Cyzicus from 1289
- Niphon I, Patriarch of Constantinople in 1310–14, was Metropolitan of Cyzicus in 1303–10
- Athanasios, Metropolitan of Cyzicus in 1324–47
- Theodoretos, proedros of Cyzicus in 1370–72
- Sebasteianos, Metropolitan of Cyzicus in 1381–86
- Matthew I, Patriarch of Constantinople in 1397–1410, was Metropolitan of Cyzicus in 1387–97
- Theognostos, Metropolitan of Cyzicus in 1399–1405
- Makarios, Metropolitan of Cyzicus in 1409
- Metrophanes II, Patriarch of Constantinople in 1440–43, was Metropolitan of Cyzicus in 1436–40
- Cyril IV, Patriarch of Constantinople in 1711–13, was Metropolitan of Cyzicus before that
- Anthimus V, Patriarch of Constantinople in 1841–1842, was Metropolitan of Cyzicus in 1831–1841

Cyzicus remained a metropolitan see of the Greek Orthodox Church until the 1923 Convention Concerning the Exchange of Greek and Turkish Populations emptied it of Greek Orthodox faithful, whether they spoke Greek or Turkish. The last bishop of the see died in 1932. Today it is a titular metropolis of the Ecumenical Patriarchate of Constantinople.

=== Catholic titular see ===
Since 1885, the Catholic Church lists Cyzicus as a titular see of the highest (Metropolitan) rank, but vacant since 1974. Titular metropolitans were:

- Jean-Baptiste Lamy (1885.08.18 – 1888.02.13)
- William Benedict Scarisbrick, O.S.B. (1888.09.08 – 1908.05.07)
- José María Cázares y Martínez (1908.04.29 – 1909.03.31)
- Johannes Fidelis Battaglia (1909.07.03 – 1913.09.10)
- Simeón Pereira y Castellón (1913.12.02 – 1921.01.29)
- Giacomo Sereggi (1921.10.14 – 1922.04.11)
- Giuseppe Moràbito (1922.07.04 – 1923.12.03)
- Antal Papp (1924.07.14 – 1945.12.24)
- Manuel Marilla Ferreira da Silva (1949.05.29 – 1974.11.23)

== Monuments ==
The site amid the marshes of Balkiz Serai is known as Bal-Kiz and entirely uninhabited, though under cultivation. The principal extant ruins are the walls, dating from the fourth century, which are traceable for nearly their whole extent, and the substructures of the temple of Hadrian, the ruins of a Roman aqueduct and a theatre.

The picturesque amphitheatre, intersected by a stream, was one of the largest in the world. Construction for the amphitheatre began in the middle of the first century until the end of the third. Its diameter was nearly 500 feet (150 m) and it is located at these coordinates 40°23′54″N 27°53′5″E, north of the main part of Cyzicus.

The colossal foundations of the temple dedicated to the emperor Hadrian are still partially visible. The temple's columns were 21.35 meters high (about 70 feet), the highest known in the ancient world. In comparison, those at Baalbek in Lebanon are only 19.35 meters (about 63 feet). The structure was the largest Greco-Roman temple ever built. Of this magnificent building, sometimes ranked among the seven wonders of the ancient world, thirty-one immense columns still stood erect in 1444. These have since been carried away piecemeal for building purposes.

The monuments of Cyzicus were used by the Byzantine emperor Justinian as a quarry for the construction of his Hagia Sophia cathedral. The Ottomans continued the exploitation of Cyzicus for building materials.

== Notable people ==
- Apollodorus, 5th century BC, military commander
- Apollophanes, 5th century BC, politician
- Athenaeus, 5th or 4th century BC, mathematician and geometer
- Prytanis, 5th or 4th century BC, Olympic athlete
- Androcydes, 4th century BC, painter
- Agathocles, 3rd century BC, historian
- Apollonis of Cyzicus, ca. 240-175/159 BC, queen of Pergamon and wife of Attalus I
- Androsthenes of Cyzicus, ca. 200 BC, accompanied King Antiochus III the Great to India.
- Athenocles, 3rd or 2nd century BC,
- Eudoxus of Cyzicus, ca. 130 BC, navigator and explorer.
- Proclus of Constantinople, appointed Metropolitan of Cyzicus in 5th century but never functioned as such; Patriarch of Constantinople and important figure in the development of Christology.
- Germanus of Constantinople, early eighth century metropolitan of Cyzicus and later Patriarch of Constantinople and early iconophile theologian.
- Gelasius of Cyzicus, 5th century ecclesiastical writer.
- Adrastus of Cyzicus, a mathematician cited by Augustine of Hippo.
- Theophanes the Confessor, who began his formal religious life at the Polychronius Monastery, located near Cyzicus.
- Iaia, a female painter, sculptor, and ivory engraver, known as Iaia of Cyzicus.
- Neanthes of Cyzicus, rhetor.
- Teucer of Cyzicus, an ancient Greek writer.

== See also ==
- Ancient sites of Balıkesir

== Sources ==
- Trapp, Erich; Beyer, Hans-Veit (2001). Prosopographisches Lexikon der Palaiologenzeit (in German). Vol. I, 1–12, Add. 1–2, CD-ROM Version. Vienna: Verlag der Österreichischen Akademie der Wissenschaften. ISBN 978-3-7001-3003-1.
