= Prytanis of Cyzicus =

Prytanis of Cyzicus was an ancient Greek boxing athlete, originating from Cyzicus. Prytanis participated in the 98th ancient Olympic Games, where he was bribed by his opponents. Both Prytanis and those who corrupted him with money were fined. With this amount, bronze statues of Zeus, known as the "Zanes," were erected at Olympia, and this became a custom thereafter. In those games, Prytanis' opponent was Eupolus of Thessaly, who corrupted not only Prytanis but also Agesias of Arcadia and Phormio of Halicarnassus with money.

According to ancient tradition, this incident was the first irregular act ever committed at the Olympic Games.

== Bibliography ==
- Emmy Patsi-Garin: «Επίτομο λεξικό Ελληνικής Μυθολογίας (Concise Dictionary of Greek Mythology)», Haris Patsis Publishing House, Athens 1969.
