= Apollodorus of Cyzicus =

Apollodorus (Ancient Greek: Ἀπολλόδωρος) of Cyzicus can refer to two different persons from ancient Greece:

- Apollodorus who lived previous to the time of Plato, who in his dialogue Ion, mentions him as one of the foreigners whom the Athenians had frequently placed at the head of their armies. This statement is repeated by the historian Claudius Aelianus, but in what campaigns Apollodorus served the Athenians is not known. Athenaeus, in censuring Plato for his malignity, mentions Apollodorus, and the other foreigners enumerated in the passage of the Ion, as instances of persons calumniated by the philosopher, although the passage does not contain a trace of anything derogatory to them.
- Apollodorus, an unknown Greek writer, who is mentioned briefly by the writer Diogenes Laërtius, and is perhaps the same as the Apollodotus of Cyzicus (Ἀπολλόδοτος ὁ Κυζικηνὸς) spoken of by Clement of Alexandria.
