= Zagan Pasha Mosque =

15th-century Ottoman-era mosque in Balıkesir, northwestern Turkey

- Zağnospaşa Cami
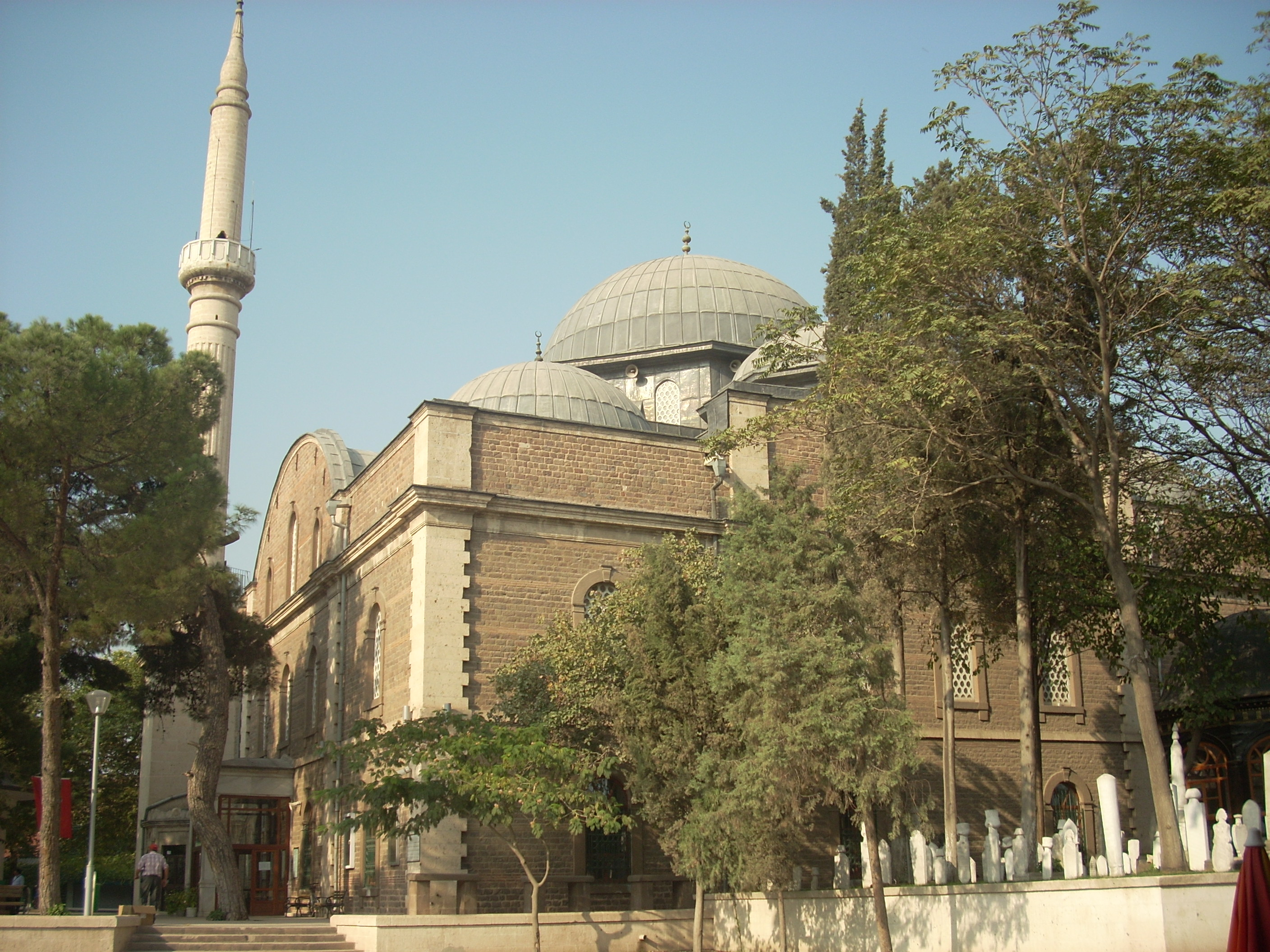

- Location of Zagan Pasha Mosque in Turkey

Religion
- Affiliation: Islam
- Status: Active

Location
- Location: Balıkesir
- Country: Turkey
- Coordinates: 39.6488075°N 27.8800449°E

Architecture
- Type: Mosque
- Style: Classical Ottoman
- Completed: 1461

Specifications
- Domes: 1 main and 4 side
- Minaret: 1
- Materials: Ashlar

Zagan Pasha Mosque (Turkish: Zağnospaşa Camii) is a historic mosque in Balıkesir, northwest Turkey. It is known as the place, where Mustafa Kemal Atatürk delivered his famous "Balıkesir Khutbah" in 1923.

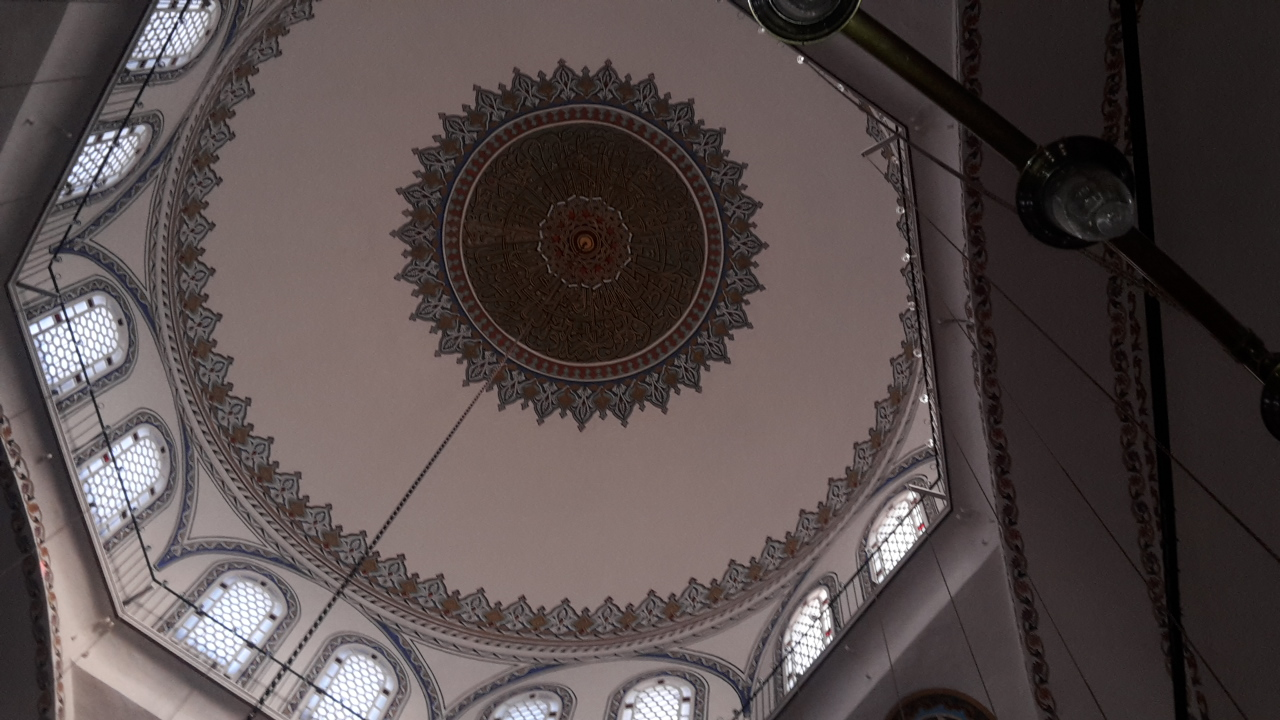
Cupola.

The mosque was built in 1461 by Zagan Pasha (fl. 1446–1462 or 1469), an Ottoman military commander and Grand Vizier of Albanian origin; he was the son of the right hand of George Castriot Skanderbeg - Vrana Konti. Located in the city center, at Mustafa Fakıh neighborhood, it is part of a complex consisting of a tomb and a hammam. The mosque and the tomb, broke down in 1897, were rebuilt in 1908 by the Mutasarrıf (Governor) Ömer Ali Bey.

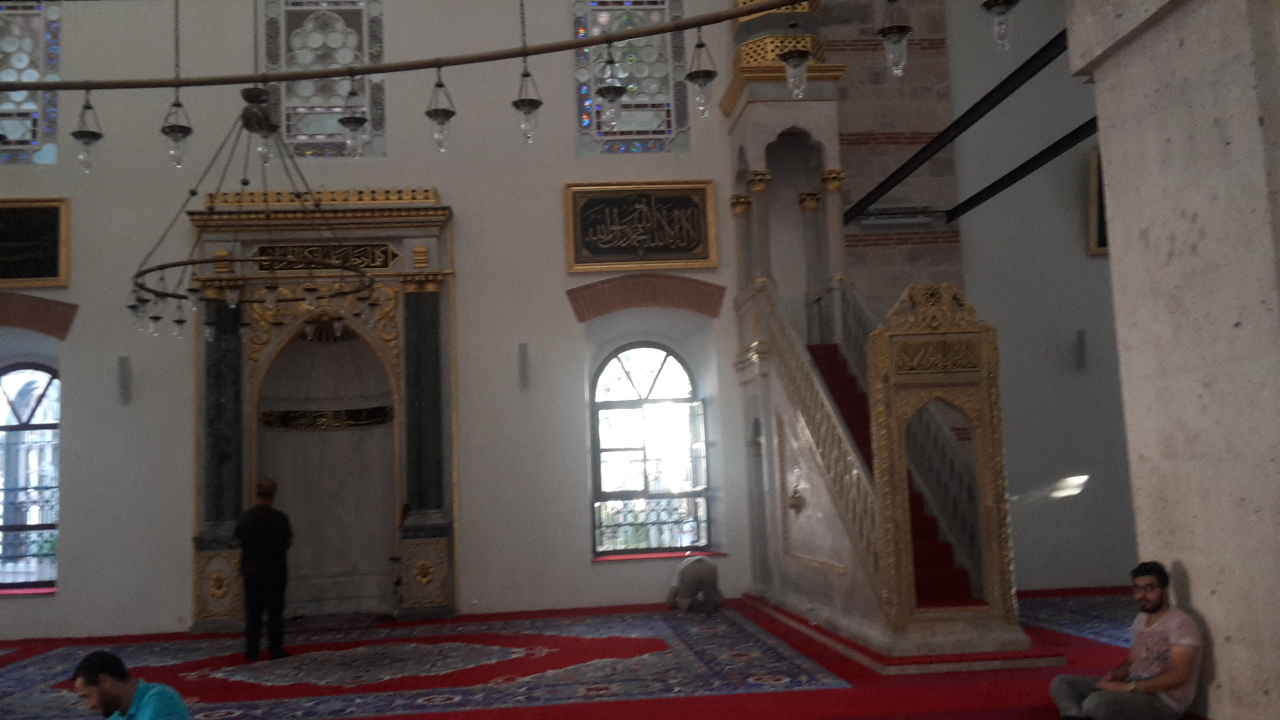
Altair of the Zagan Pasha Mosque

It is the biggest mosque in Balıkesir. The square-plan mosque is constructed in ashlar masonry. It has one main dome surrounded by four side domes, which are separated by vaults. Entrance to the mosque is through double-winged wooden doors in the north, west and east. On three sides of the mosque, in front of the doors, there is a porch with an inclined lead-coated timber roof supported by two square marble columns. The mosque has no narthex. The minaret is situated on the northwest corner of the building. It was donated by Hacı Hafız Efendi of Arabacıoğulları, a notable family in Balıkesir. In the courtyard, two shadirvans and a tomb are situated. Outside of the courtyard's northwest corner, there is a third shadirvan of pentagon plan. A sundial is attached on a table sitting on a short thick column at the south of the courtyard.

During his visit to Balıkesir on February 7, 1923, shortly after the end of the Turkish War of Independence (May 19, 1919 – October 11, 1922), Mustafa Kemal Atatürk, then known as Gazi Mustafa Kemal Pasha, delivered a khutbah (an Islamic sermon), which became famous as the "Balıkesir Khutbah", in the mosque.
