= Athenocles of Cyzicus =

Ancient Greek grammarian

Athenocles (Ancient Greek: Ἀθηνοκλῆς) of Cyzicus was a grammarian and writer of ancient Greece who wrote commentaries on the poet Homer. He lived some time around the 3rd or 2nd centuries BCE.

According to the grammarian Athenaeus, he understood the Homeric poems better than Aristarchus of Samothrace, who was the most renowned Homer scholar of the ancient world. Other writers were less enthusiastic about his scholarship. The ancient grammarian Ammonius of Alexandria, who was notably a teacher at a school founded by Aristarchus, wrote an entire treatise Against Athenocles of Cyzicus.

There is another obscure writer with this name who wrote upon the early history of the Assyrians and Medes, who may be the same person.

Still another Athenocles of Cyzicus is cited by Porphyry and Eustathius of Thessalonica, as writing on allegory and botany, respectively. Whether these are the same as the above is also unclear.
