= Athenaeus of Cyzicus =

Ancient Greek mathematician and geometer

Athenaeus of Cyzicus was an ancient Greek mathematician and geometer who was active in the 4th century BC.

Originally from Cyzicus, he moved to ancient Athens and became a student of Plato. Athenaeus of Cyzicus is mentioned by Proclus in his work "Commentaries on Euclid," where he is characterized as "exceptionally skilled in geometry." His work has not survived, nor has the title of it, which from the context must have been involved in geometrical research. During his stay in Athens, he engaged in discussions at the Academy with Plato, Menaechmus, and Dinostratus.

== Sources ==
- François Lasserre (1987). De Léodamas de Thasos à Philippe d'Oponte : témoignages et fragments. pp. 135–8. ISBN 8870881369.

== Bibliography ==
- Proclus. Commentaries on Euclid
- Natorp. Paulys Real-Encyclopadie, Vol. 2, Metzler - Stuttgart 1896, page 2025
- E. Stamatis. Ιστορία των Ελληνικών Μαθηματικών (History of Greek Mathematics) (in Greek) 2nd edition. Athens 1980
- Papyrus Larousse Britannica Encyclopedia, Vol. 3, page 465.
- K. Georgakopoulos. Αρχαίοι Έλληνες Θετικοί Επιστήμονες (Ancient Greek Positive Scientists), Georgiadis Publications, Athens 1995, page 32 - ISBN 960-316-058-X
