= Balıkesir =

- City
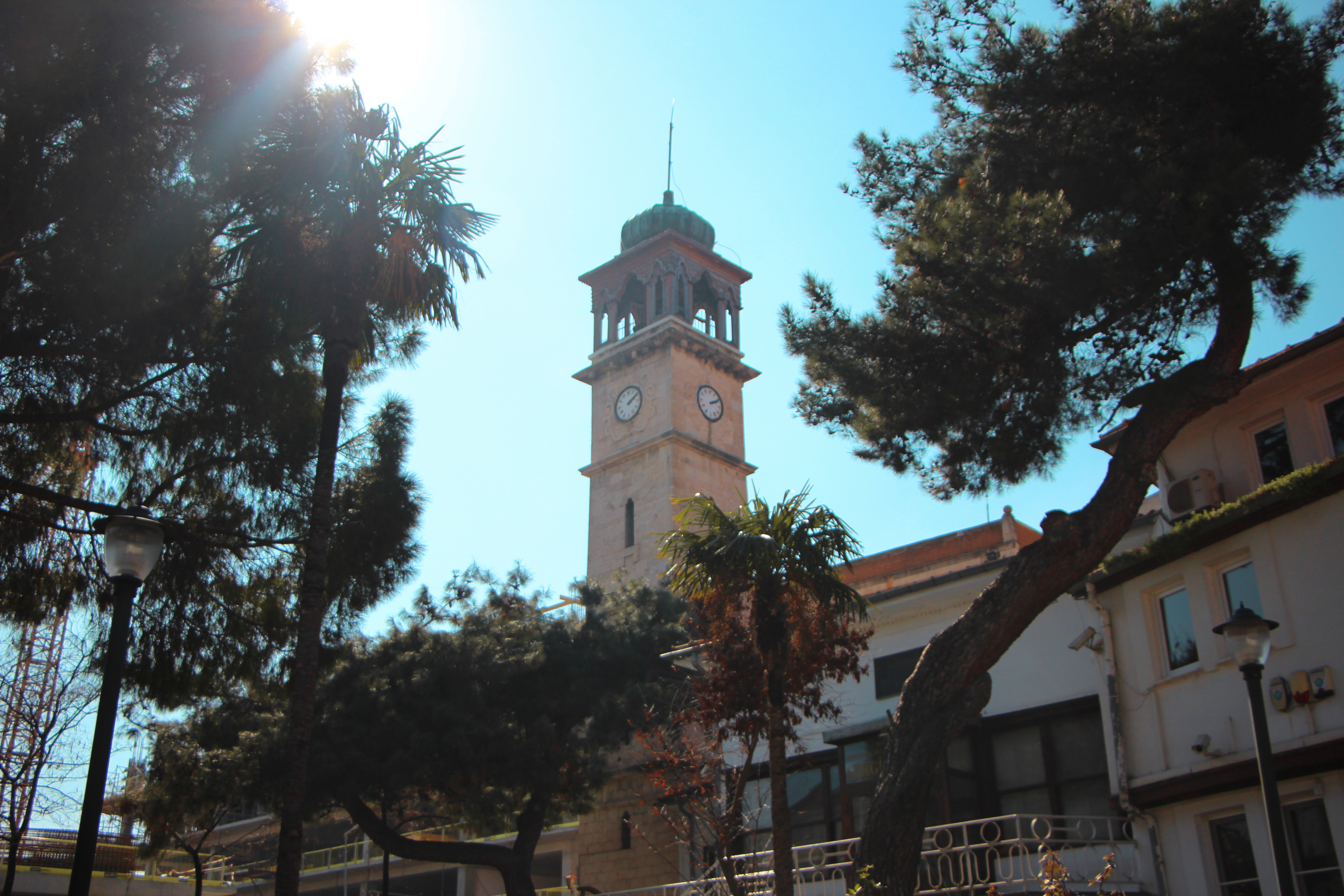
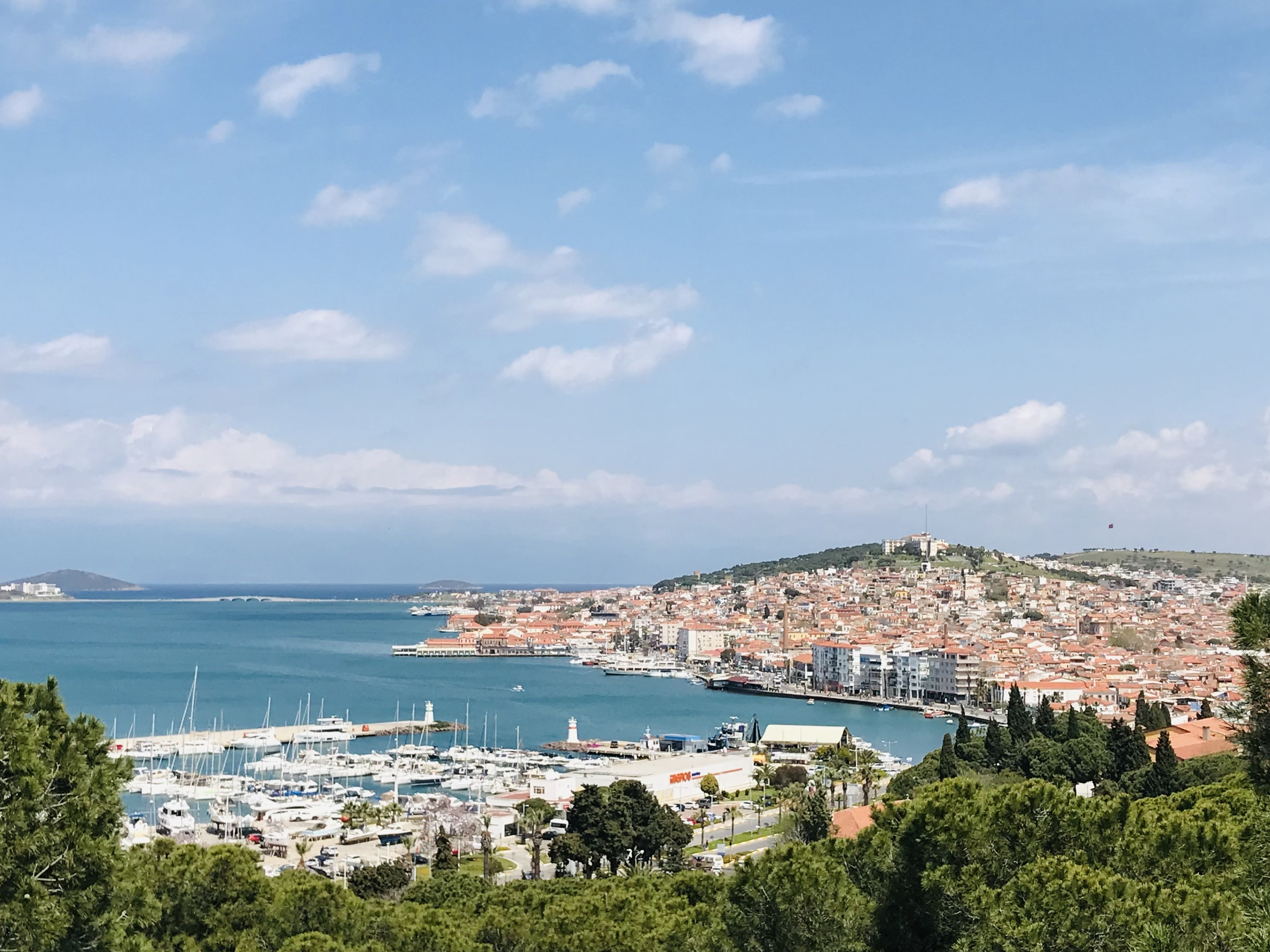
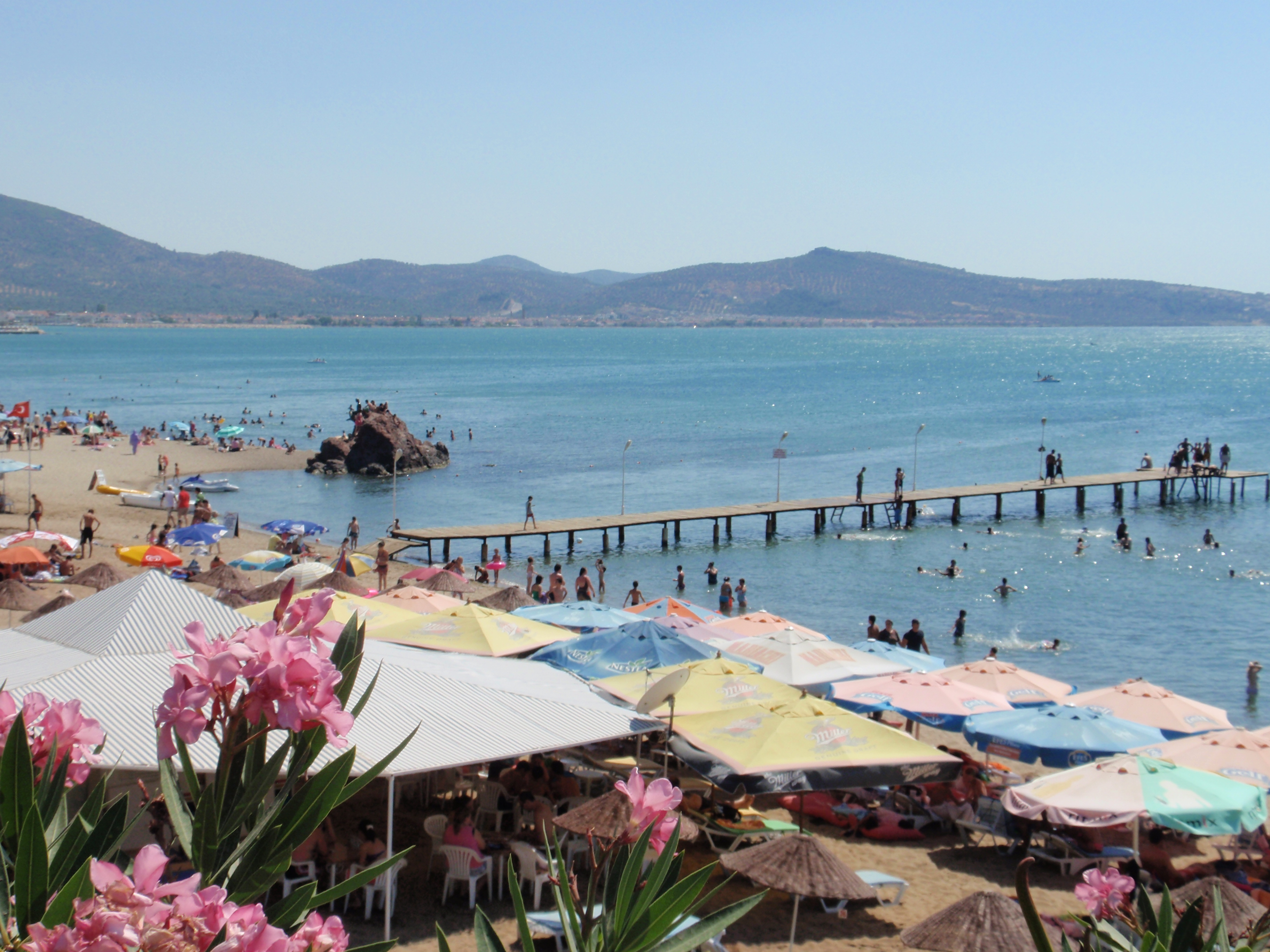
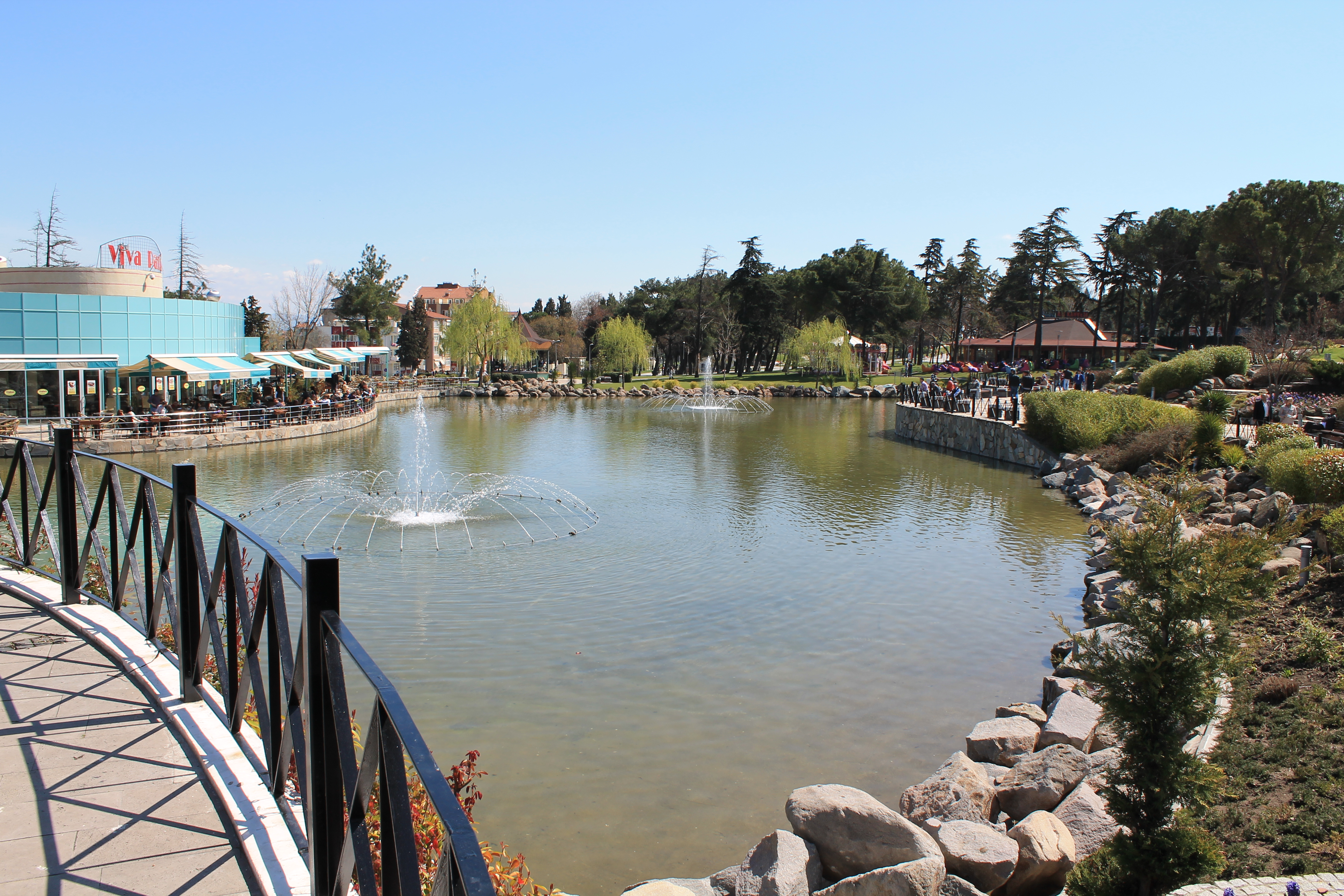
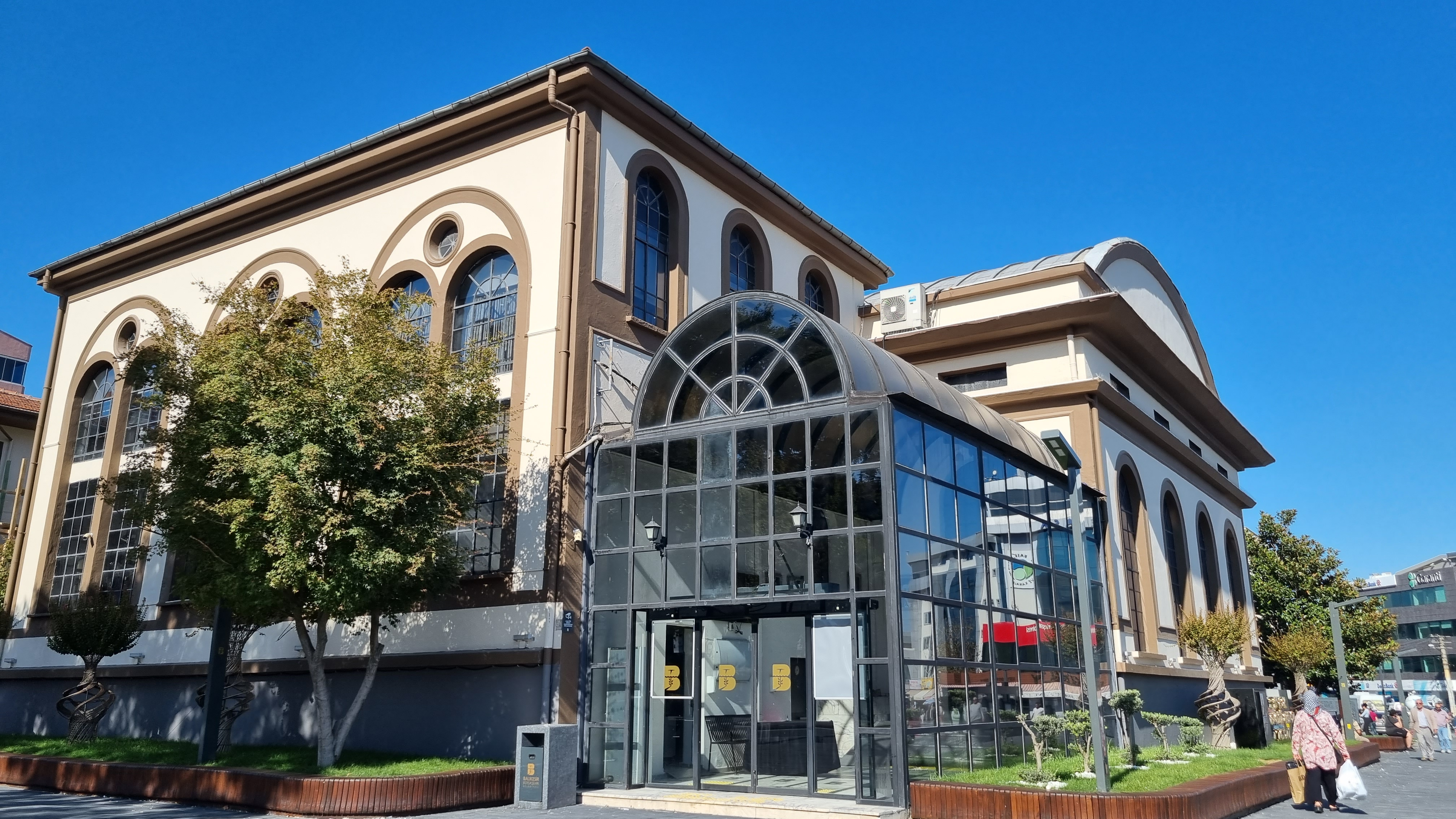
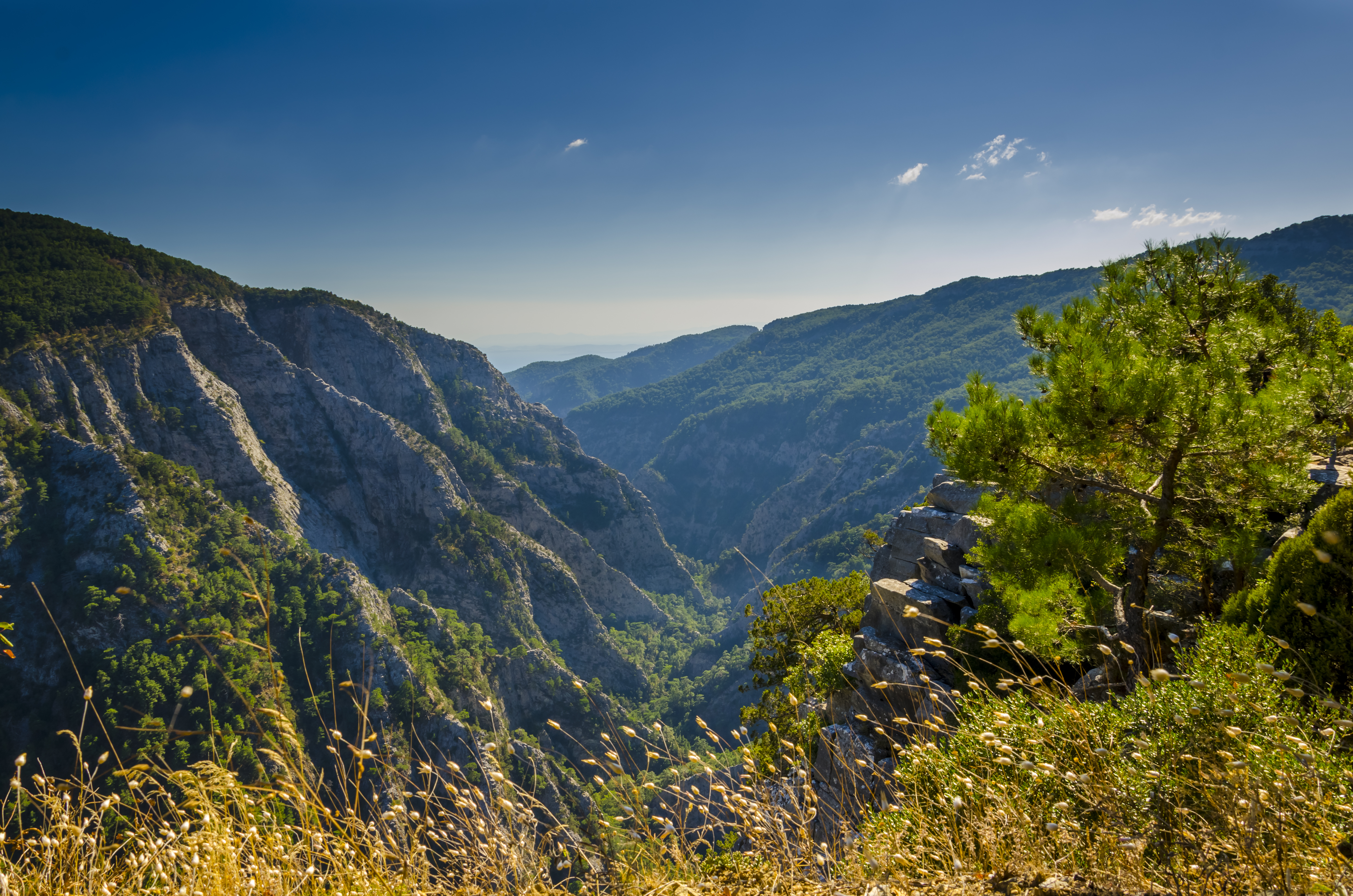
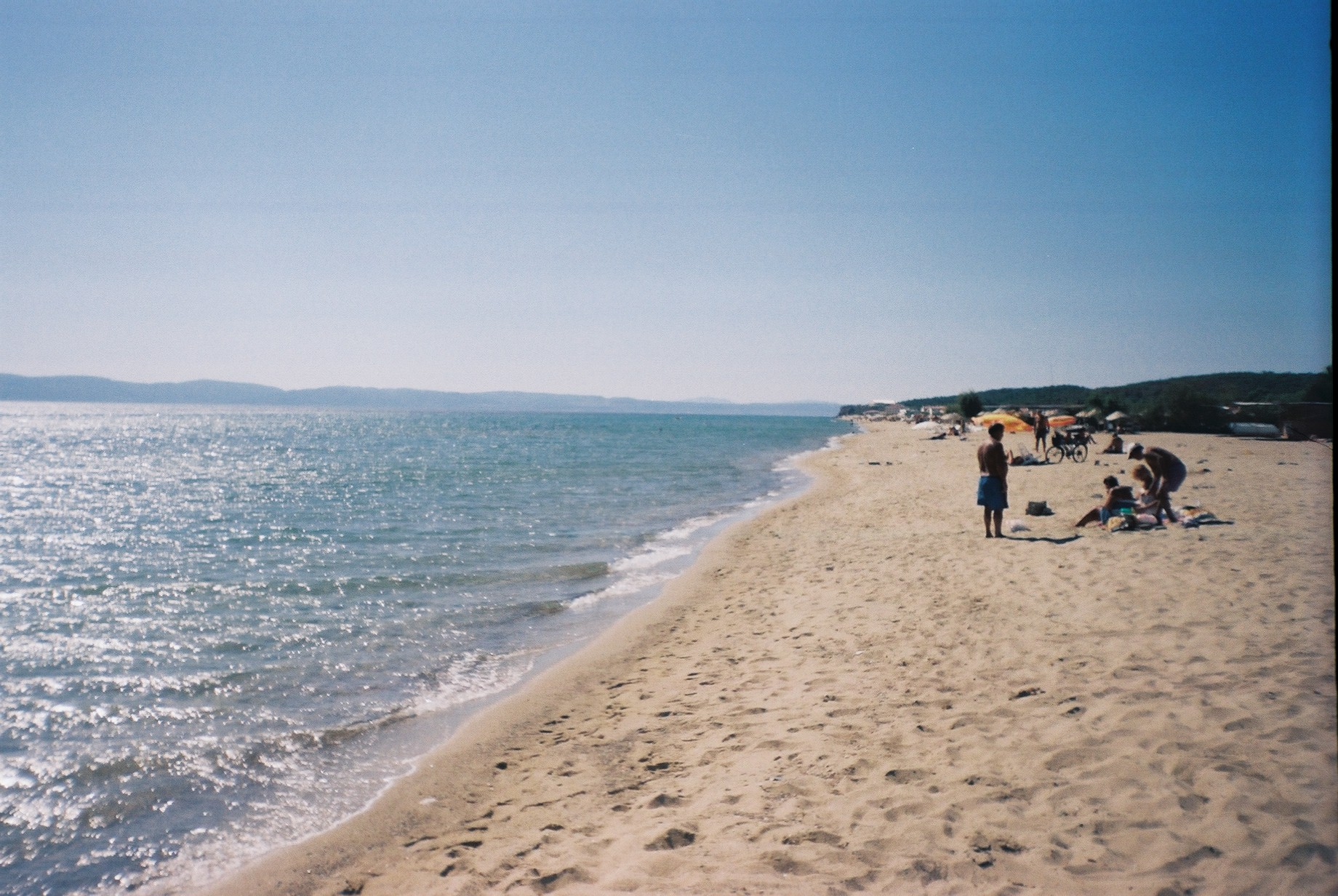
- Clockwise from top: Clocktower in Balıkesir, Zagnos Pasha Mosque, Balıkesir Museum, Sarımsaklı Beach, Ottoman Architecture in Balıkesir, Atatürk Park, Fountain in Balıkesir

- Emblem of Balıkesir Metropolitan Municipality

- Location of Balıkesir Balıkesir (Marmara) Balıkesir (Europe)
- Coordinates: 39°38′50″N 27°53′17″E
- Country: Turkey
- Region: Marmara
- Province: Balıkesir Province

Government
  - Governor: İsmail Ustaoğlu
  - Metropolitan Mayor: Ahmet Akın (CHP)
- Elevation: 70 m (230 ft)

Population (2022)
  - Total: 314,958
- Time zone: UTC+3 (TRT)
- Postal code: 10xxx
- Area code: (+90) 266
- Licence plate: 10
- Website: www.balikesir.gov.tr

Balıkesir (Turkish pronunciation: [baˈlɯcesiɾ]) is a city in the Marmara region of Turkey. It is the seat of Balıkesir Province, which is also a metropolitan municipality. As of 2022, the population of Balıkesir Province is 1,257,590, of which 314,958 in the city proper (the urban part of the districts Altıeylül and Karesi). Between 1341 and 1922, it was the capital of Karasi. Balikesir joined the UNESCO Global Network of Learning Cities in 2020.

== History ==
Close to modern Balıkesir was the Roman town of Hadrianutherae, founded, as its name commemorates, by the emperor Hadrian. Hadrian came to the region in 124 A.D., as a result of a successful bear hunting he had established a city called his name here. It is estimated that the city consisted of the castle, the homestead, the stud and a few homes. It is thought that the small town was where the current stadium is present.

Members of the Roman and Pre-Byzantine dynasty had used this castle as a vacation area and for hunting. During the Byzantine period, the small town which had become increasingly neglected was known as Palaiokastron (Greek: Παλαιόκαστρον) meaning Old Castle.

Also, when the Turkomans came from Middle Asia to Mysia, they called it Balukiser because of the remains of the castle, as Hisar is the Turkish word for castle. Balıkesir's former name was Karasi because Balıkesir city was founded by Karasi Bey in the 13th century as using the remains of the small town. 1297 is considered as the date of establishment of the city which was one of the few to be founded by the Turks in Anatolia. The Karasids was a Turkic principality in Mysia. Since the 13th century, Balıkesir city have been the administrative centre of the Mysia region.

In 1345, Balıkesir city was annexed by the Ottomans. In 1898 an earthquake destroyed much of the city. The number of buildings that were not destroyed in the 1898 earthquake was only 51. On 30 June 1919 Balıkesir city was occupied by the invading Greeks but on 6 September 1922, the Turkish Army took back the city. During the Turkish War of Independence, Balıkesir was the main centre of the Turkish militias in Western Anatolia against the occupying Greek Army.

On 3 August 1950, a major fire destroyed the centre of the city which was rebuilt later. That fire destroyed an important part of the city. According to estimates, it was the result of the firing of firecrackers belonging to child guns in a shop. According to another opinion, it was caused by the gnawing of the firecrackers of child guns by rats and this fire spread to the electrical contact. 498 shops completely burned. It is the second biggest disaster to befall in Balıkesir after the 1898 earthquake. Nearly a thousand people were unemployed. The tents were set up by the Turkish Red Crescent and food aid was provided for a long time.

In January 1974, a cassette player and five tapes were stolen from a car belonging to Mehmet Aygün, located in the Yalın Apartment area, by unknown individuals.

== Main sights ==
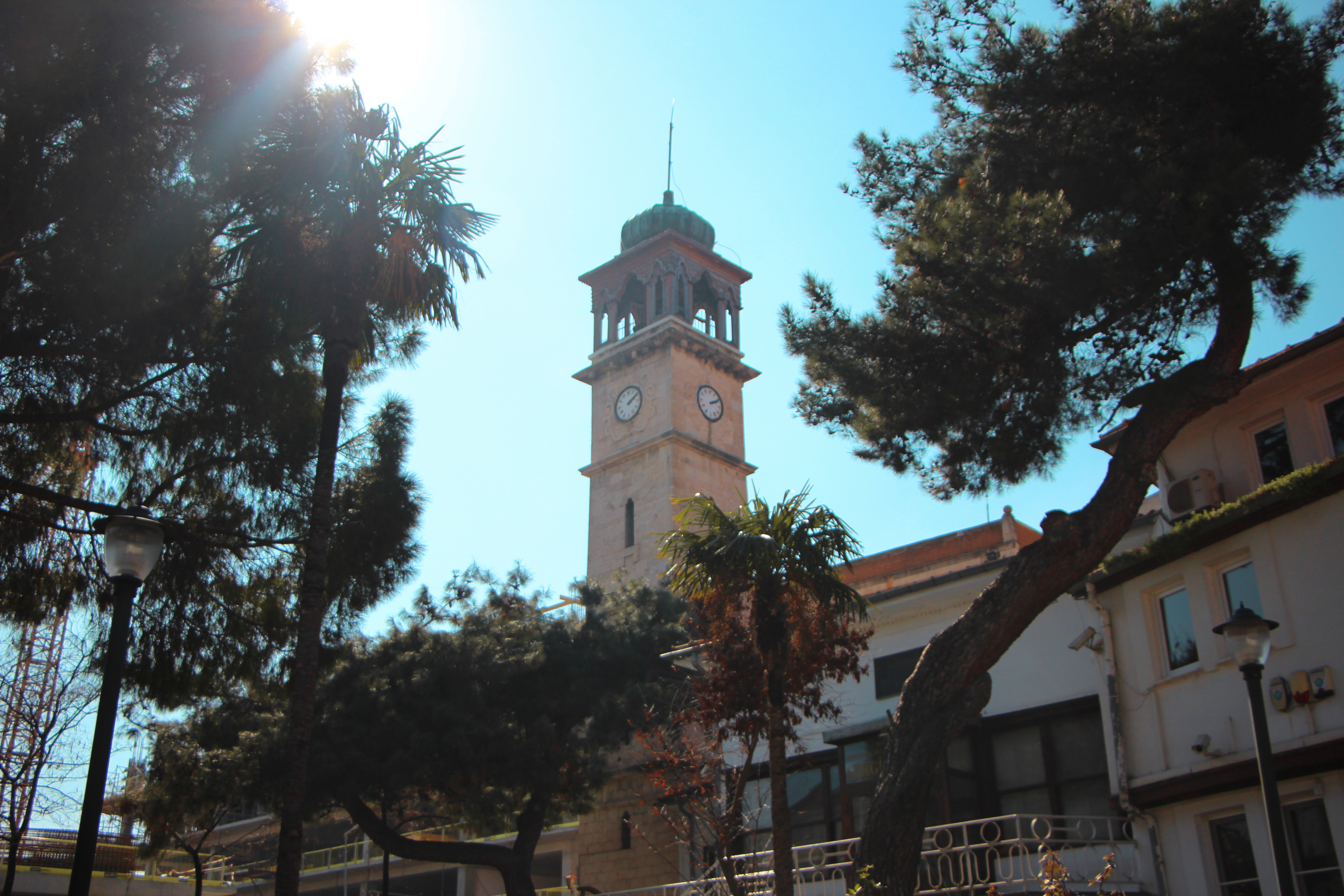
The historical clock tower

- Zaganos Pasha Mosque built by and named after the Grand Vizier of Mehmet the Conqueror, Zaganos Pasha in 1461. Only the mosque and baths remain.
- Yildirim Mosque built in 1388 is the oldest remaining work from the Ottoman period in Balikesir city.

== Sports ==
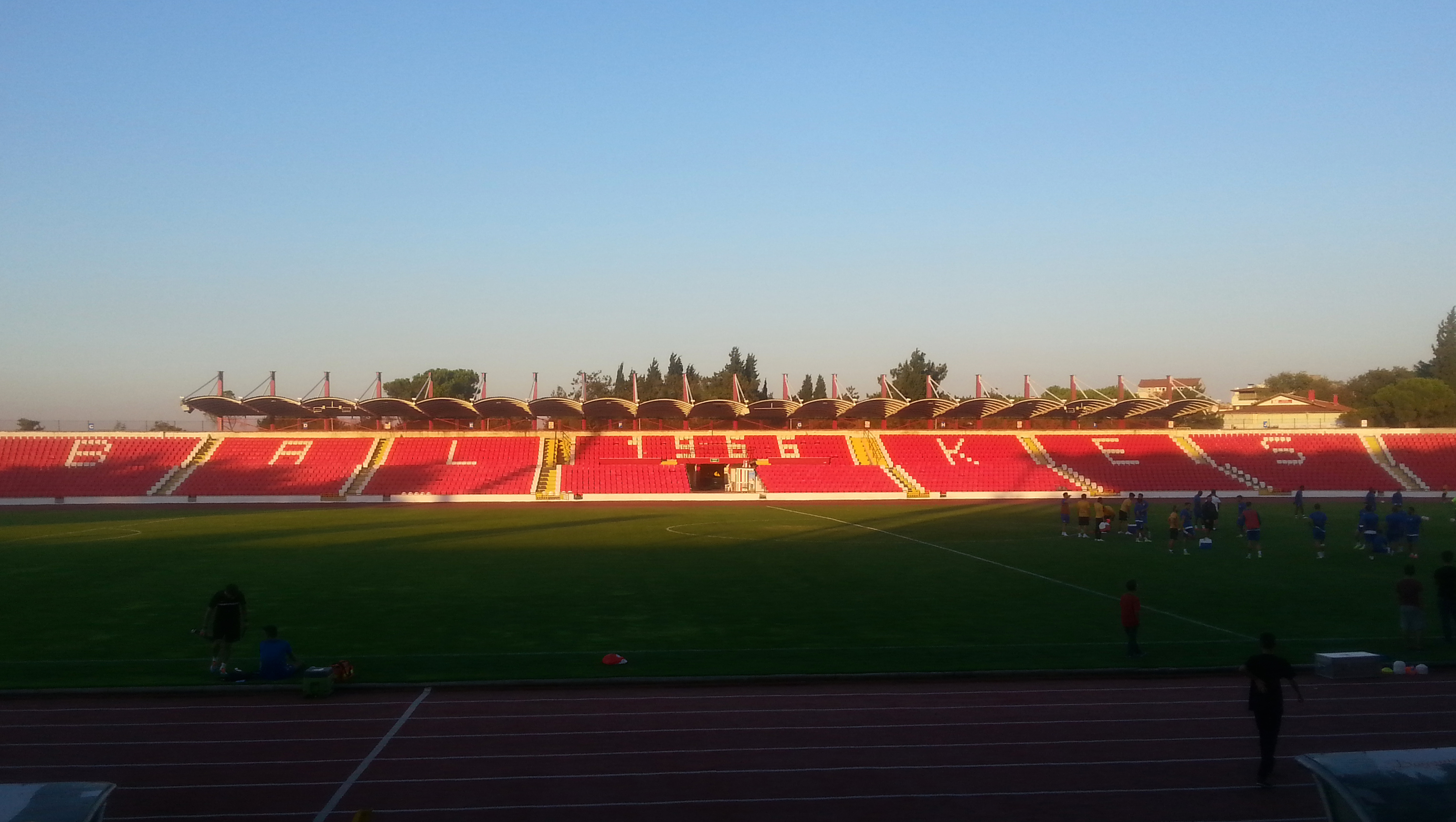
Stadium of Balıkesir

Most known sports club in Balıkesir is Balıkesirspor which is established in 1966. Balıkesirspor is the football team played in the Süper Lig after achieving promotion having finished as runners-up of the TFF First League in 2013–14. The team's previous promotion was 40 years before that. Their stadium, the all-seater Balıkesir Atatürk Stadium, has a capacity of 13,732.

== Climate ==
Balıkesir has a fairly continental hot-summer Mediterranean climate (Csa) under the Köppen climate classification and a temperate oceanic climate (Do) under the Trewartha classification. Winters are cool and wet with frequent frosts and occasional snowfall, while summers are hot and dry. The continentality increases as one moves from west to east and north to south. Therefore, winters are colder and snowier in the inland parts.

Climate data for Balıkesir (1991–2020, extremes 1938–present)
Month	Jan	Feb	Mar	Apr	May	Jun	Jul	Aug	Sep	Oct	Nov	Dec	Year
Record high °C (°F)	23.5 (74.3)	25.2 (77.4)	30.0 (86.0)	33.1 (91.6)	37.8 (100.0)	42.5 (108.5)	43.2 (109.8)	43.2 (109.8)	40.3 (104.5)	38.3 (100.9)	31.2 (88.2)	26.1 (79.0)	43.2 (109.8)
Mean daily maximum °C (°F)	8.8 (47.8)	10.4 (50.7)	13.2 (55.8)	19.1 (66.4)	24.2 (75.6)	29.3 (84.7)	30.8 (87.4)	31.1 (88.0)	28.0 (82.4)	22.7 (72.9)	15.0 (59.0)	9.9 (49.8)	20.2 (68.4)
Daily mean °C (°F)	4.8 (40.6)	5.7 (42.3)	7.9 (46.2)	13.1 (55.6)	18.2 (64.8)	23.0 (73.4)	24.9 (76.8)	25.0 (77.0)	21.1 (70.0)	16.6 (61.9)	9.9 (49.8)	6.6 (43.9)	14.7 (58.5)
Mean daily minimum °C (°F)	1.1 (34.0)	1.5 (34.7)	3.1 (37.6)	7.4 (45.3)	12.1 (53.8)	16.1 (61.0)	18.4 (65.1)	18.9 (66.0)	14.5 (58.1)	11.0 (51.8)	5.4 (41.7)	3.1 (37.6)	9.4 (48.9)
Record low °C (°F)	−11.9 (10.6)	−18.8 (−1.8)	−7.1 (19.2)	−4.0 (24.8)	1.1 (34.0)	5.0 (41.0)	11.0 (51.8)	9.4 (48.9)	3.2 (37.8)	−1.6 (29.1)	−7.9 (17.8)	−10.1 (13.8)	−18.8 (−1.8)
Average precipitation mm (inches)	47.9 (1.89)	54.1 (2.13)	65.1 (2.56)	55.7 (2.19)	46.5 (1.83)	16.2 (0.64)	10.0 (0.39)	9.4 (0.37)	20.7 (0.81)	44.4 (1.75)	67.0 (2.64)	87.2 (3.43)	524.2 (20.64)
Average precipitation days	13.25	13.63	12.50	11.00	10.88	5.00	3.63	2.13	2.75	8.00	10.25	14.75	107.8
Average snowy days	4.25	3.71	1.13	0.13	0	0	0	0	0	0	0.21	2.54	11.97
Mean monthly sunshine hours	93.0	101.7	136.4	171.0	223.2	276.0	294.5	279.0	234.0	161.2	105.0	52.7	2,127.7
Mean daily sunshine hours	3.0	3.6	4.4	5.7	7.2	9.2	9.5	9.0	7.8	5.2	3.5	1.7	5.8
Source: Turkish State Meteorological Service, Meteomanz(snow days 2000-2023)

== Municipality ==
In the Official Gazette of the Republic of Turkey, under law 6360, published on 6 December 2012, Balıkesir Municipality qualified as a"Metropolitan".

== International relations ==
Balıkesir is twinned with;

- Makhachkala, Russia
- Shymkent, Kazakhstan (since 1995)
- Kazan, Russia (since 1996)
- Roxas City, Philippines (since 1997)
- Prizren, Kosovo (since 1997)
- Štip, North Macedonia (since 1999)
- Lefkada, Greece (since 2000)
- Schwäbisch Hall, Germany (since 2006)
- Siirt, Turkey (since 2007)
- Chungcheongnam-do, South Korea (since 2010)

== Notable natives ==
- Ahmet Nuri Öztekin, Military officer in the Ottoman and Turkish armies
- Barış Falay, Actor
- Bekir Sami Günsav, Military officer in the Ottoman and Turkish armies
- Caner Erkin, Football player
- Cengiz Ünder, Football player
- Cihat Arslan, Football player, coach
- Çetin Zeybek, Football player
- Egemen Korkmaz, Football player, coach
- Erdal Tosun, Actor
- Fikret Hakan, Actor
- Hande Erçel, Actress and model
- İlhan Eker, Football player
- İlker Ayrık, Actor
- Kazım Özalp, Military officer in the Ottoman and Turkish armies
- Kurtdereli Mehmet Pehlivan, World-famous oil wrestler
- Mehmet Çoban, Olympian Greco-Roman wrestler
- Nazmi Solok, Military officer in the Ottoman and Turkish armies
- Necdet Tosun, Actor
- Nedim Günar, Football player, coach
- Oğuz Savaş, Basketball player
- Olcan Adın, Football player
- Ömer Seyfettin, Writer
- Seyit Onbaşı, Ottoman army gunner
- Şafak Edge, Basketball player
- Şevket Altuğ, Actor
- Tamer Yiğit, Actor
- Tuğçe Kazaz, Actress and model
- Tülin Altıntaş, Volleyball player
- Vasıf Çınar, Politician and diplomat
- Vedat İnceefe, Football player, coach
- Zağanos Pasha, Ottoman military commander
- Zerrin Tekindor, Actress and artist

== See also ==
- Altıeylül
- Karesi
- Balıkesirspor
