= Agathocles (writers) =

Agathocles (Ancient Greek: Ἀγαθοκλῆς; fl. 3rd century BC) was a Greek historian who wrote a history of Cyzicus (περὶ Κυζίκου) in the Ionic dialect. He is called by Athenaeus both a Babylonian and a Cyzican. He may originally have come from Babylon, and have settled at Cyzicus. The first and third books are referred to by Athenaeus. The time at which Agathocles lived is unknown, and his work is now lost; but it seems to have been extensively read in antiquity, as it is referred to by Cicero, Pliny, and other ancient writers. Agathocles also spoke of the origin of Rome. The scholiast on Apollonius cites Memoirs (ὑπομνήματα) by an Agathocles, who is usually supposed to be the same as the above-mentioned one.

There are several other writers of the same name, whose works are lost to us but are mentioned by later writers:

- Agathocles of Atrax, who wrote a work on fishing.
- Agathocles of Chios, who wrote a work on agriculture.
- Agathocles of Miletus, who wrote a work on rivers.
- Agathocles of Samos, who wrote a work on the constitution of Pessinus.
