= Anonymus Cyzicenus =

The Anonymus Cyzicenus is the anonymous author of an ecclesiastical history of the 5th century. It has often been misattributed to Gelasius of Cyzicus, an error going back to Photius and followed by the editor of the editio princeps. The anonymous author never mentions his name.

The author tells us that he was the son of a priest of Cyzicus, and that he wrote in the Roman province of Bithynia in Asia Minor, about 475, to prove against the Eutychians, that the Nicene Fathers did not teach Monophysitism. These details he gives us in his preface. Beyond that nothing is known about him.

His "Syntagma" or collection of Acts of the First Nicene Council has hitherto been looked upon as the work of a sorry compiler; recent investigations, however, point to its being of some importance. It is divided into three books: book I treats of the Life of Constantine down to 323; book II of History of the Council in thirty-six chapters; of book III only fragments were originally published, until the whole of book III was discovered by Cardinal Mai in the Ambrosian Library.

The serious study of the sources of Anonymus Cyzicenus may be said to have begun with Turner's identification of the long passages taken from Rufinus in book II. A complete analysis of the sources was done by Gerhard Löscheke, whose efforts restored to Anonymus Cyzicenus a place among serious Church historians, of which he has been wrongly deprived and have also lent weight to the hitherto generally rejected idea that there was an official record of the Acts of the Council of Nicaea; and further that it was from this record that Dalmatius derived the opening discourse of Constantine, the confession of Hosius, the dialogue with Phaedo, and the nine dogmatic constitutions, which Hefele had pronounced "most certainly spurious".

The "John" to whom Anonymus Cyzicenus refers, as a forerunner of Theodoret, is still unidentified; from him were derived the published portions of book III, the letters of Constantine to Arius, to the Church of Nicomedia and to Theodotus, all of which Löschcke contends are authentic. He also proves that a comparison of Constantine's letter to the Synod of Tyre (335), as given by Anonymus and Athanasius, shows Anonymus to give the original, Athanasius an abbreviated version.

== Sources ==
- English translation of the whole work from the Hansen edition.
- Wace, Henry (1911). "Gelasius (13), an author from Cyzicus". Dictionary of Christian Biography and Literature to the End of the Sixth Century.
