= Ammonius of Alexandria =

Ancient Greek grammarian

Ammonius (Ancient Greek: Ἀμμώνιος) of Alexandria, son of Ammonius, was an ancient Greek grammarian who lived around the 1st century BCE.

He was a pupil of a teacher named "Alexander" (possibly Alexander Polyhistor), and became one of the chief teachers in the grammatical school founded by Aristarchus of Samothrace. He is at times described as the successor of Aristarchus at the school; the Byzantine encyclopedia known as the Suda says that he took over the school "before Augustus".

He wrote commentaries on Homer, Pindar, and Aristophanes, none of which are extant. He is quoted several times by the grammarian Didymus Chalcenterus, who was another follower of the school of Aristarchus.

We have the names of several of his works, but none survive:

- On the fact that there were no multiple editions of Aristarchus's Recension (Περὶ τοῦ μὴ γεγονένται πλείονας ἐκδόσεις τῆς Ἀρισταρχείου διορθώσεως)
- On the Re-Edited Recension (Περὶ τῆς ἐπεκδοθείσης διορθώσεως -- it is unclear whether this is a distinct work or the same as the above)
- On Plato's Borrowings from Homer (Περὶ τῶν ὑπὸ Πλάτωνος μετενηνεγμένων Ὁμήρου)
- Against Athenocles (Πρὸς Ἀθηνοκλέα)
