= Apollophanes of Athens =

Athenian poet of Old Comedy

Apollophanes of Athens (Ancient Greek: Ἀπολλοφάνης ὁ Ἀθηναῖος) was a poet of the old Attic comedy. He appears to have been a contemporary of Strattis, and to have consequently lived about Olympiad 95.

== Surviving titles and fragments ==
The editors of the Suda ascribe to him five comedies, viz. Dalis (Δάλις), Iphigeron (Ἰφιγέρων), Cretans (Κρῆτες), Danae (Δανάη) and Centaurs (Κένταυροι). Of the former three we still possess a few fragments, but the last two are completely lost.
