= Apollophanes of Cyzicus =

Apollophanes (Ancient Greek: Ἀπολλοφάνης) of Cyzicus was connected by friendship with the Persian satrap Pharnabazus II, and afterwards formed a similar connexion with Agesilaus II. Soon after this, Pharnabazus requested him to persuade Agesilaus to meet him, which was done accordingly. This happened in 396 BCE, shortly before the withdrawal of Agesilaus from the satrapy of Pharnabazus.
