= Ergasteria =

Inland town of ancient Mysia

Coordinates: 39°43′40″N 27°35′47″E

Ergasteria (Ancient Greek: Ἐργαστήρια) was an inland town of ancient Mysia on the road from Pergamum to Cyzicus, 440 stadia from Pergamum. It was noted by Galen as near a source of a metallic substance he called molybdaena. It was also known for silver mining in antiquity.

Its site is located near Balya Maden in Asiatic Turkey.
