= November 14 (Eastern Orthodox liturgics) =

Day in the Eastern Orthodox liturgical calendar

Eastern Orthodox liturgical calendar
| November 13 | November 14 | November 15 |
November 14 O.S. ≍ November 27 N.S. November 14 N.S ≍ November 1 O.S.

An Eastern Orthodox cross

November 14 in Eastern Orthodox liturgical calendars is a feast day and a day of commemoration of saints and martyrs. Although some Orthodox churches use the Revised Julian Calendar and others use the traditional Julian calendar, the fixed commemorations for their respective November 14 are broadly the same, no matter which calendar is used. (Note: Despite the dates being the same, the days to which they refer typically differ by 13 days. The notation Old Style or O.S. is sometimes used to indicate a date in the traditional Julian Calendar (the "Old Calendar"). The notation New Style or N.S. indicates a date in the Revised Julian calendar (the "New Calendar").)

== Saints ==
- Holy and All-Praised Apostle Philip (c. 81–96) (Note: Name days celebrated today include: Phillip (Φίλιππος); Filio (Φιλιώ).)
- Saint Stachys, Bishop of Hierapolis (in Phrygia) (1st century) (Note: In the Synaxarion of St Nicodemus, and in the biography of the Apostle Philip, it is stated that after the death of the Apsotle Philip, the Apostle Bartholomew who was accompanying him ordained Stachys as the Bishop of Hierapolis (in Phrygia). However other Synaxaristes do not mention this fact.)
- Saint Justinian the Emperor (565) and his wife St. Theodora (548) (see also: November 15)
- Saint Thomas II the New, Ecumenical Patriarch of Constantinople (668–669) (see also: November 15 and November 16)
- Virgin Martyrs of Emesa, Syria (779) (Note: "At Emesa, the passion of many holy women, who were barbarously tortured and massacred under Mady, a savage Arabian chief.")
- Saint Fantinus the Younger, of Calabria (c. 1000)

== Pre-Schism Western saints ==
- Saint Veneranda (Venera), an early martyr in France (2nd century) (Note: "Also, in France, the holy virgin Veneranda, who received the crown of martyrdom under the emperor Antoninus and the governor Asclepiades.")
- Saint Venerandus, an influential citizen of Troyes in France martyred under Aurelian (275) (Note: "At Troyes, in France, St. Venerandus, martyr, under the emperor Aurelian.")
- Saint Jucundus of Bologna, Bishop of Bologna in Italy (485) (Note: "At Bologna, St. Jucundus, bishop and confessor.")
- Saint Dubricius (Dubric, Dyfrig), Bishop in Hereford and Gwent, hermit, of Bardsey Island (c. 550) (Note: One of the founders of monastic life in Wales. His main monastic centres were at Henllan and Moccas. However, he founded many other monasteries in Gwent and in England in what is now Herefordshire and the Wye Valley. He had jurisdiction over Caldey Island where he appointed St Samson abbot and later consecrated him bishop. A late tradition makes him Archbishop of Caerleon. He reposed on the Isle of Bardsey.)
- Saint Sidonius of Saint-Saëns, a monk at Jumièges Abbey, later the first abbot of Saint-Säens (c. 690) (Note: Born in Ireland, Sidonius became a monk at Jumièges in the north of France with St Philibert (644). Later he became the first abbot of a small monastery which that bishop had founded near Rouen. This monastery was later called Saint-Säens.)
- Saint Malo of Brittany (7th century) (see also: November 15)
- Saint Alberic (Alberik) I of Utrecht, Bishop of Utrecht (784) (Note: Nephew of St Gregory of Utrecht, he became a priest and, on his uncle's repose in 775, Bishop of St Martin's in Utrecht in the Netherlands. Highly educated, his work among the pagan Teutons was very fruitful.)
- Saint Modanic, a bishop in Scotland (8th century)

== Post-Schism Orthodox saints ==
- Saint Euphemianos the Wonderworker, of Cyprus (12th century) (Note: Saint Euphemianos the Wonderworker was one of the "300 Allemagne Saints" in Cyprus. The 300 Allemagne Saints came to Cyprus from Palestine, and lived as ascetics in various parts of the island. Included among the "300 Allemagne Saints" are: Venerable Anastasios the Wonderwoker of Cyprus, September 17; Venerable Abbacum the Ascetic of Cyprus, Wonderworker, December 2; Venerable Cassian the Martyr (Kassianos), December 4; Venerable Calantius of Tamassos (Kalandios), April 26; Martyr Constantine of Cyprus (Constantine of Allemagne), Wonderworker, July 1; According to some of their lives in the Great Synaxaristes, after the dissolution of the Second Crusade (1147–1149), they decided to live the monastic life in the Jordan desert. However since the Latins there disturbed them, they relocated to Cyprus and dispersed over the island.)
- Saint Gregory Palamas the Wonderworker, Archbishop of Thessaloniki (1360)
- Saint Philip, founder of Irap Monastery, Novgorod (1527) (Note: See: (in Russian) Филипп Ирапский. Википедии. (Russian Wikipedia).)
- New Martyr Constantine of Hydra, at Rhodes (1800)
- New Martyr Panteleimon the Youth, of Spetses, in Crete (1848) (Note: A research conducted by Mystagogy Resource Center indicated that the martyrdom of Panteleimon was fabricated by his mother.)

=== New martyrs and confessors ===
- New Hieromartyrs (1937):

- Priests: Demetrius Benevolensky; (Note: See: (in Russian) Беневоленский, Дмитрий Михайлович. Википедии. (Russian Wikipedia).) Alexander Bykov; (Note: See: (in Russian) Быков, Александр Яковлевич. Википедии. (Russian Wikipedia).) Victor Ilyinsky; Alexis Nechayev; Michael Belyustin; Michael Nekrasov; Theodore Bakkalinsky; Peter Titov; Alexis Nikologorsky; Sergius Znamensky; Nicholas Dunayev; Basil Likharev; Alexander Pokrovsky; Nicholas Vinogradov; (Note: See: (in Russian) Виноградов, Николай Иванович (священник). Википедии. (Russian Wikipedia).) Demetrius Lebedev; Porphirius Kolosovsky; Basil Nikolsky; George Izvekov; (Note: See: (in Russian) Извеков, Георгий Яковлевич. Википедии. (Russian Wikipedia).) Basil Rozanov; Sergius Spassky; Alexander Chekalov; Sergius Rufitsky;
- Nicholas Bogorodsky, Deacon;
- Aristarchus (Zaglodin-Kokorev), (Note: See: (in Russian) Аристарх (Заглодин-Кокорев). Википедии. (Russian Wikipedia).) Hieromonk of St. Nicholas Peshnosha Monastery, (Note: See: (in Russian) Николо-Пешношский монастырь. Википедии. (Russian Wikipedia).) Moscow.
- Martyr Gabriel Bezfamilnov;
- Martyr Demetrius Rudakov;
- Virgin-martyr Anna Zertsalova. (Note: See: (in Russian) Зерцалова, Анна Ивановна. Википедии. (Russian Wikipedia).)

- New Hieromartyr Theodore Grudakov, Priest (1940)
- New Hieromartyr Sergius Konstantinov, Priest (1941)

== Other commemorations ==
- Repose of St. Alexander Nevsky (Alexis in schema), Great Prince of Novgorod (1263) (see also: November 23 - burial; August 30 - translation of relics)
- Repose of Archimandrite Lazarus (Moore) of Eagle River, Alaska (1992).

== Icon gallery ==
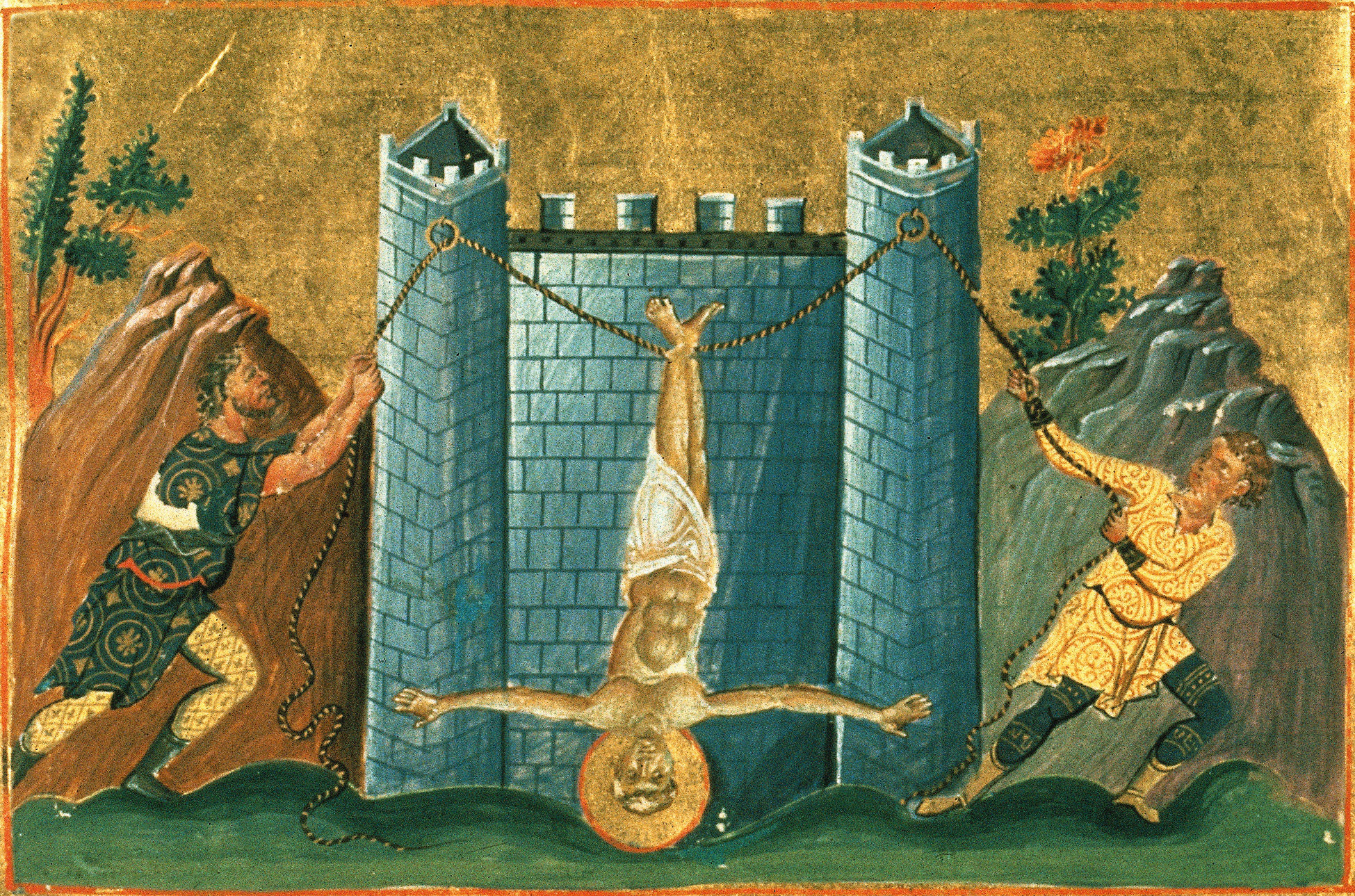
Martyrdom of the Apostle Philip.
(Menologion of Basil II, 10th century).

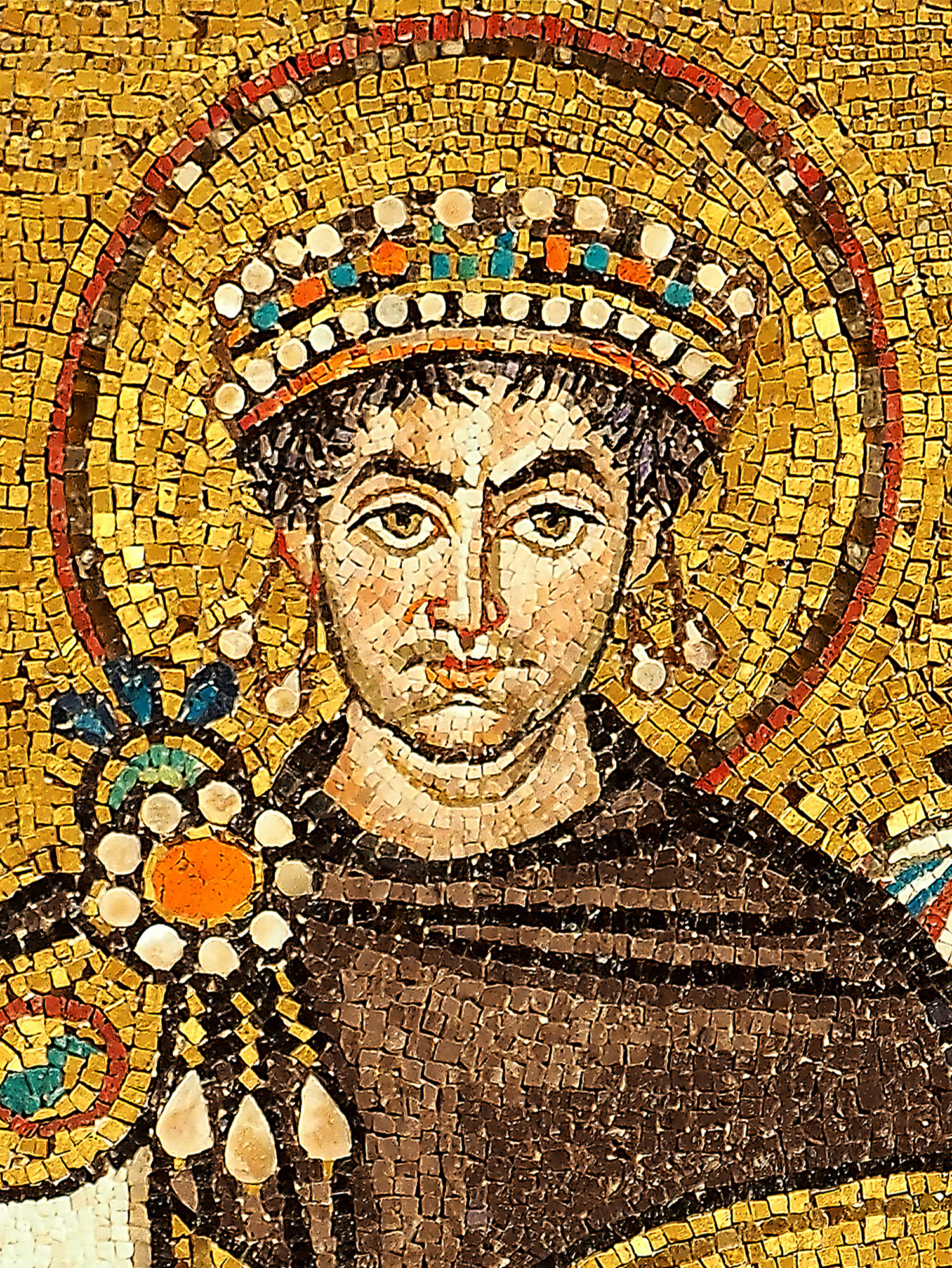
St. Justinian the Emperor.

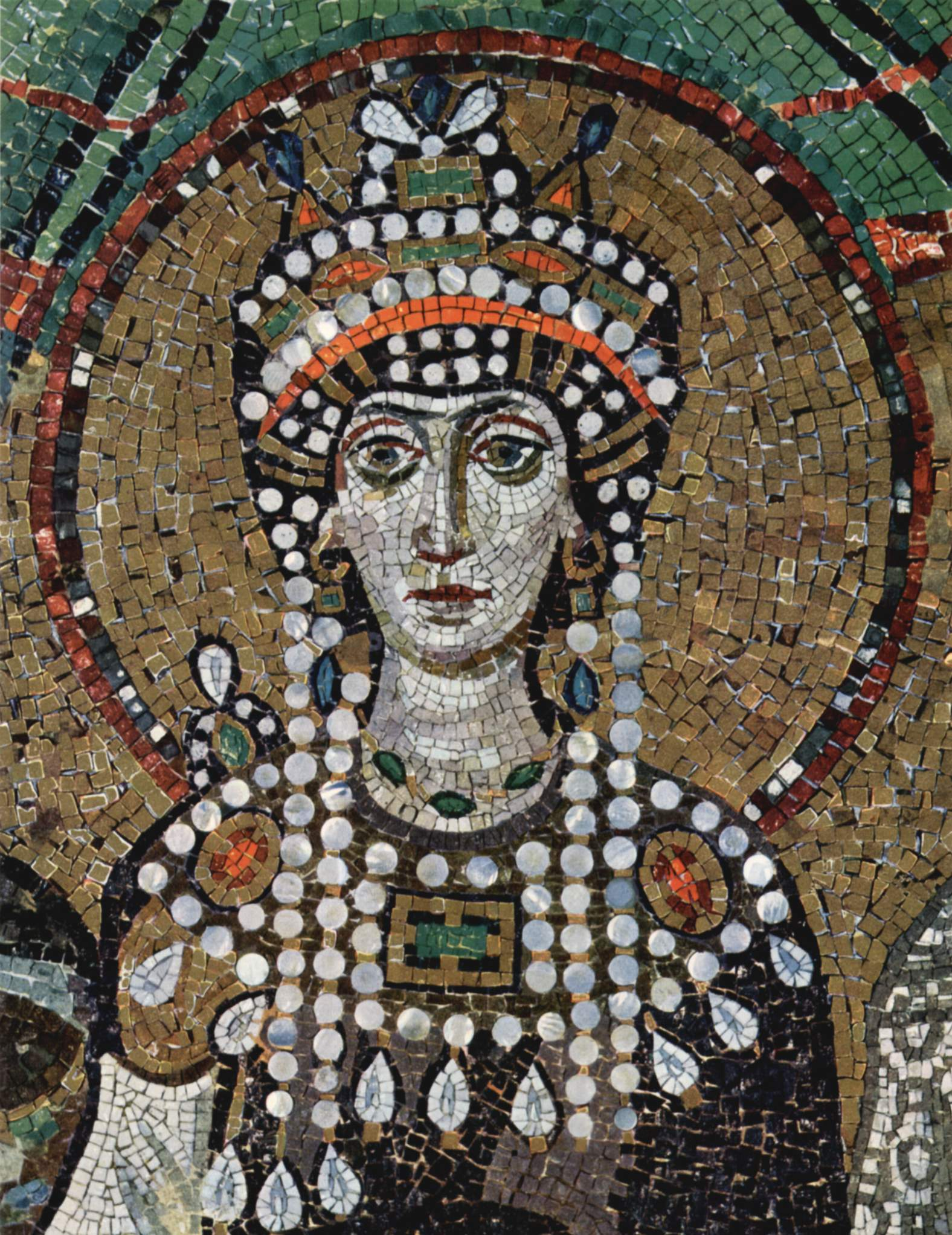
St. Theodora.

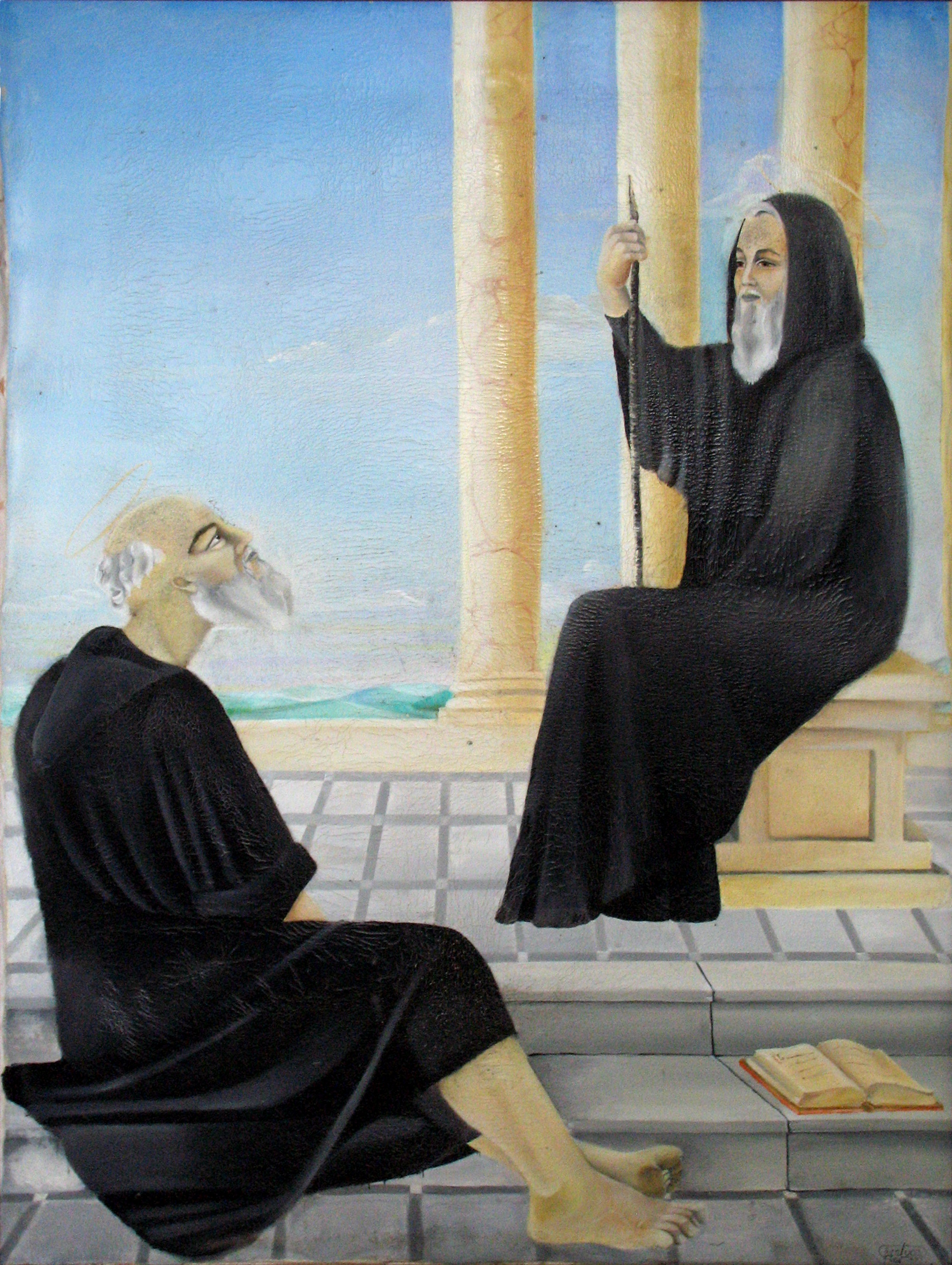
St. Fantinus the Younger, of Calabria.
(right).

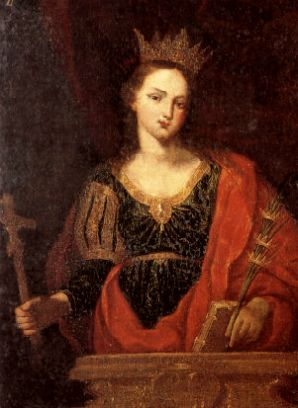
St. Venera of Gaul.

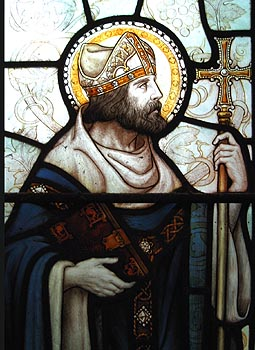
Saint Dubricius.

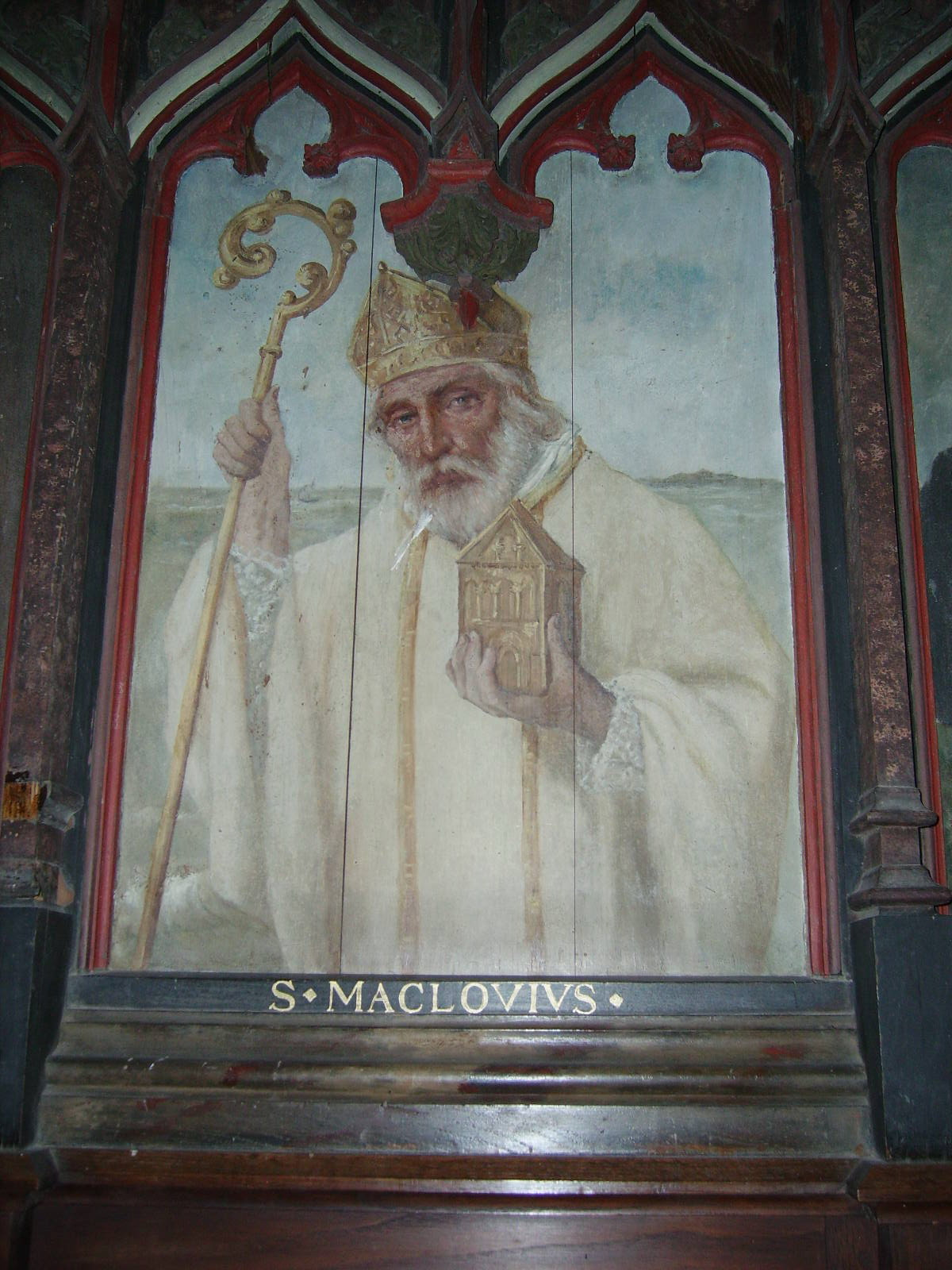
St. Malo (Maclovius), first Bishop of Aleth.

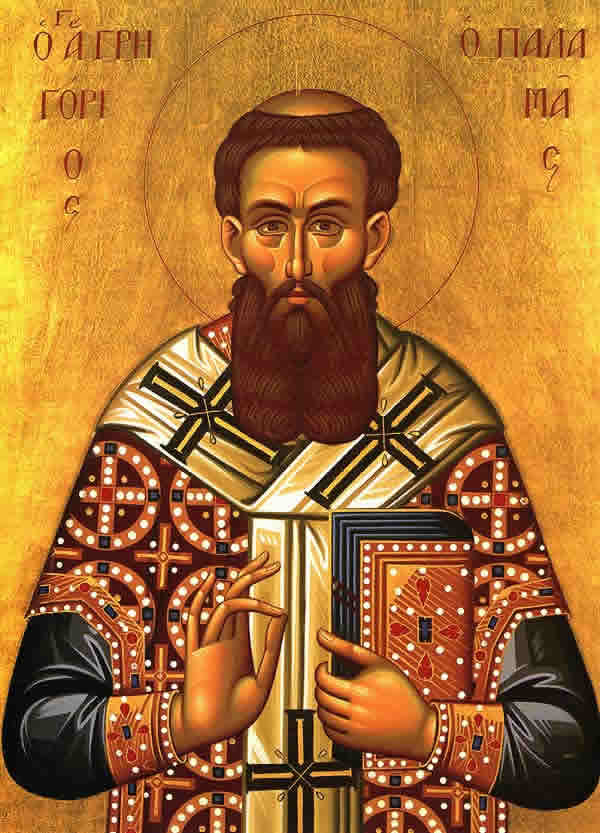
St. Gregory Palamas the Wonderworker, Archbishop of Thessaloniki.

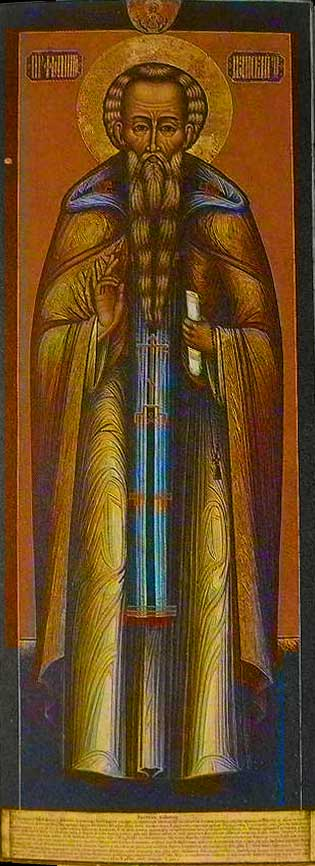
St. Philip, founder of Irap Monastery, Novgorod.

New Hieromartyr Demetrius Benevolensky, Archpriest.

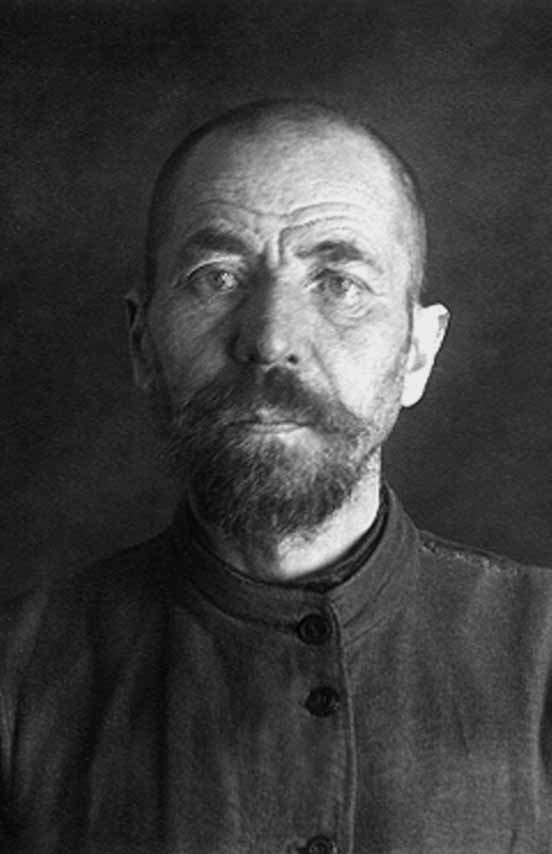
New Hieromartyr Alexander Bykov.

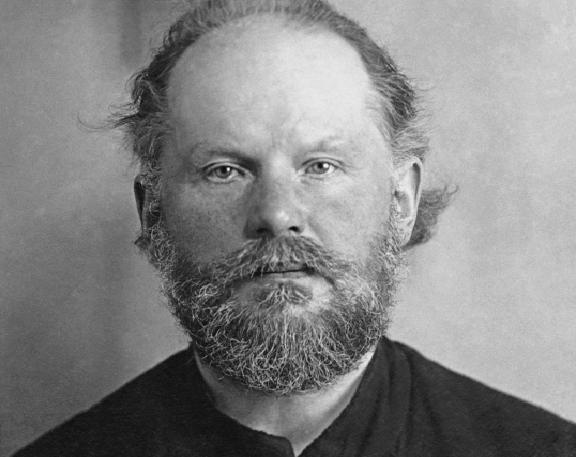
New Hieromartyr George Izvekov.

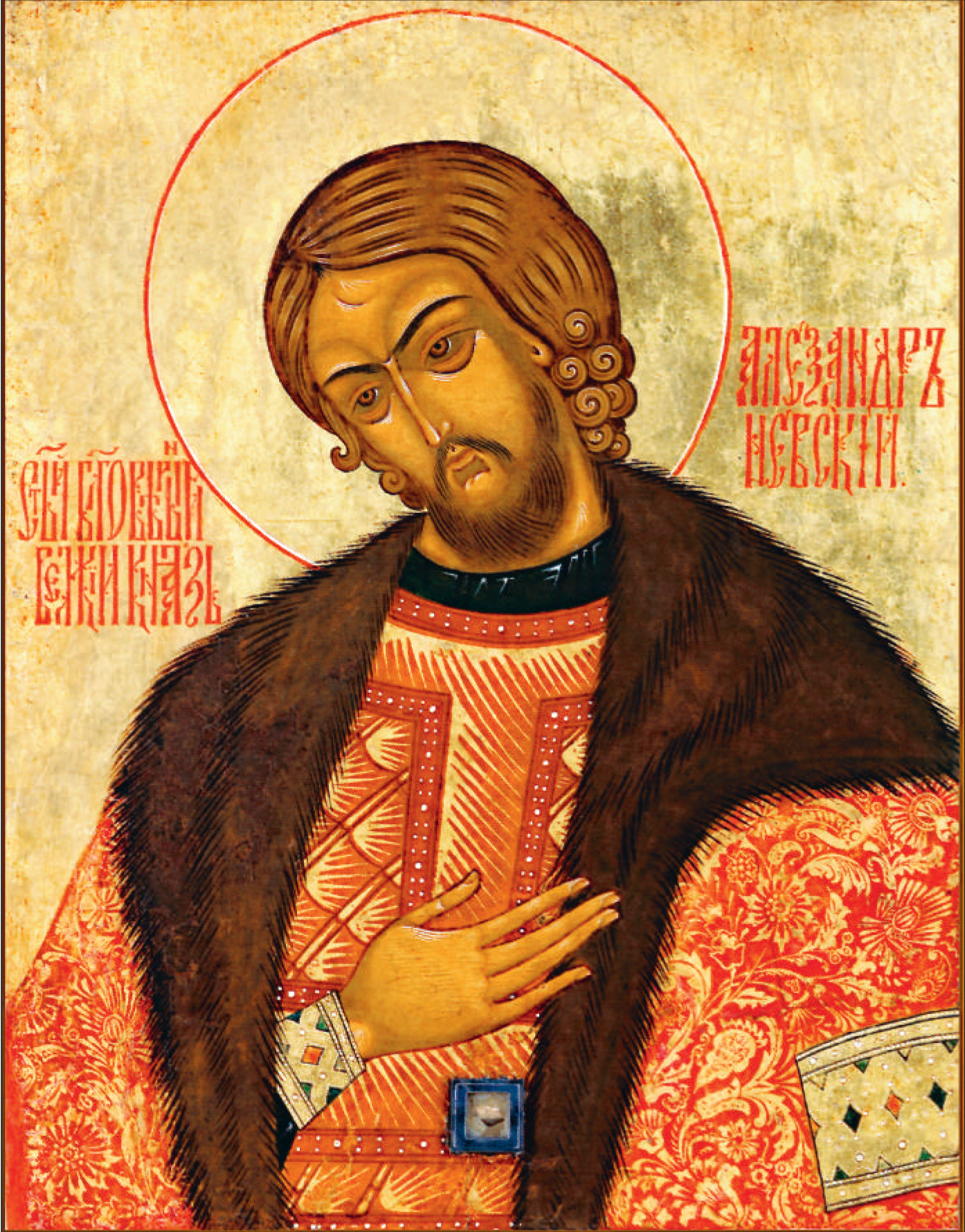
St Alexander Nevsky, Grand Prince of Novgorod.

== Sources ==
- November 14/November 27. Orthodox Calendar (PRAVOSLAVIE.RU).
- November 27 / November 14. HOLY TRINITY RUSSIAN ORTHODOX CHURCH (A parish of the Patriarchate of Moscow).
- November 14. OCA - The Lives of the Saints.
- The Autonomous Orthodox Metropolia of Western Europe and the Americas (ROCOR). St. Hilarion Calendar of Saints for the year of our Lord 2004. St. Hilarion Press (Austin, TX). p. 85.
- The Fourteenth Day of the Month of November. Orthodoxy in China.
- November 14. Latin Saints of the Orthodox Patriarchate of Rome.
- The Roman Martyrology. Transl. by the Archbishop of Baltimore. Last Edition, According to the Copy Printed at Rome in 1914. Revised Edition, with the Imprimatur of His Eminence Cardinal Gibbons. Baltimore: John Murphy Company, 1916. pp. 351–352.
- Rev. Richard Stanton. A Menology of England and Wales, or, Brief Memorials of the Ancient British and English Saints Arranged According to the Calendar, Together with the Martyrs of the 16th and 17th Centuries. London: Burns & Oates, 1892. pp. 538–542.

Greek Sources

- Great Synaxaristes: (in Greek) 14 ΝΟΕΜΒΡΙΟΥ. ΜΕΓΑΣ ΣΥΝΑΞΑΡΙΣΤΗΣ.
- (in Greek) Συναξαριστής. 14 Νοεμβρίου. ECCLESIA.GR. (H ΕΚΚΛΗΣΙΑ ΤΗΣ ΕΛΛΑΔΟΣ).
- (in Greek) November 14. Ορθόδοξος Συναξαριστής.

Russian Sources

- (in Russian) 27 ноября (14 ноября). Православная Энциклопедия под редакцией Патриарха Московского и всея Руси Кирилла (электронная версия). (Orthodox Encyclopedia - Pravenc.ru).
- (in Russian) 14 ноября по старому стилю / 27 ноября по новому стилю. Русская Православная Церковь - Православный церковный календарь на 2016 год.
