= Abibus of Edessa =

4th-century Christian martyr and saint

Saint Abibus
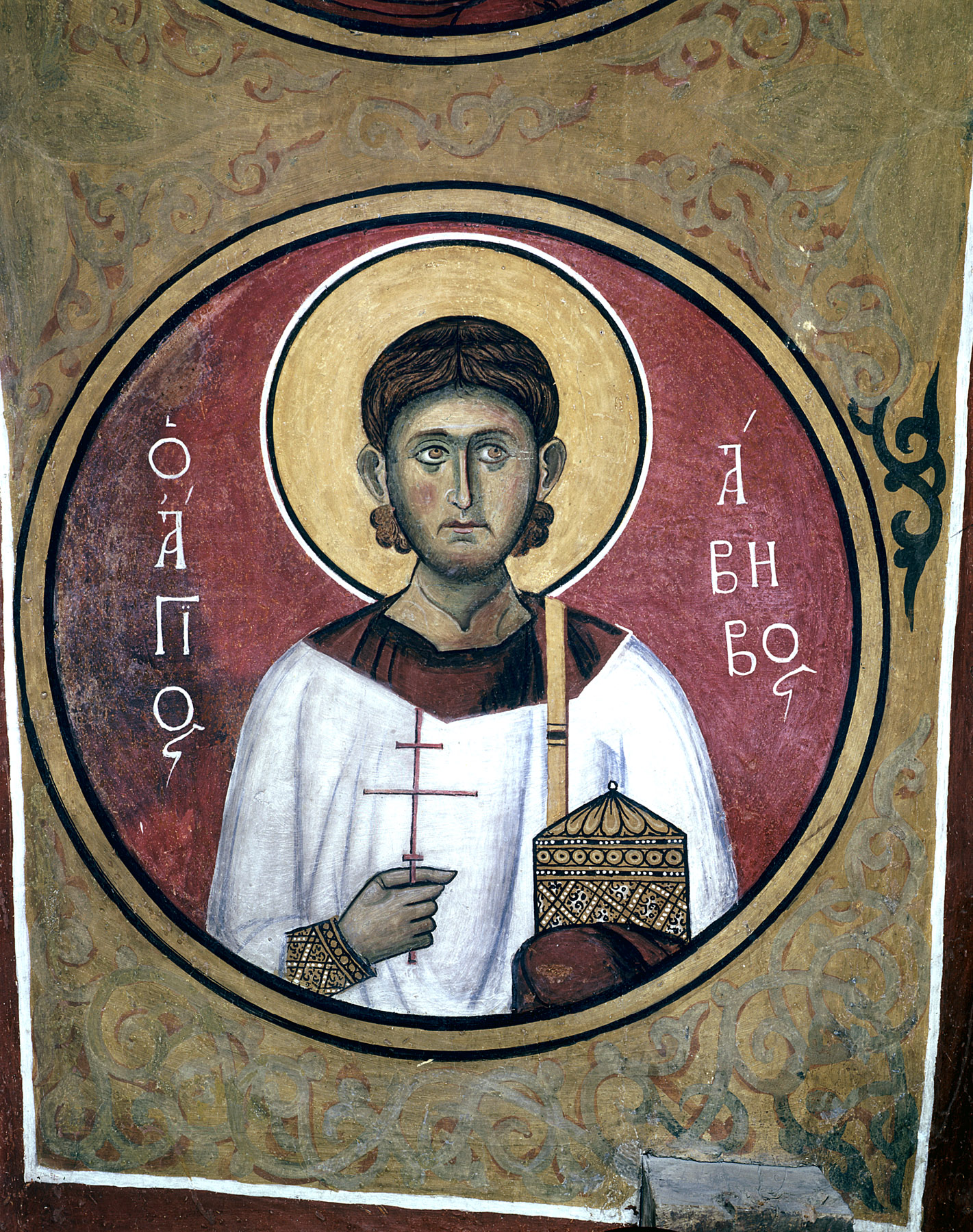
- Byzantine fresco

Deacon, Confessor, Martyr
- Born: 307 AD; Edessa, Roman Syria (modern-day Urfa, Turkey)
- Died: 322 AD; Edessa, Roman Syria (modern-day Urfa, Turkey)
- Cause of death: Immolation
- Venerated in: Eastern Orthodox church Oriental Orthodox Church; Roman Catholic Church
- Canonized: Pre-congregation
- Feast: 15 November (Eastern Orthodox and Roman Catholic); 2 September (Oriental Orthodox)
- Attributes: Depicted holding a censer while on fire
- Patronage: Contracts, marriages; firemen; Syria (region), Syrians

Abibus of Edessa (Syriac: ܚܒܝܒ ܐܘܪܗܝܐ, romanized: Ḥabbīḇ Ōrhāyā; Greek: Άβιβος της Εδέσσης; Church Slavonic: абиб от едеса; Arabic: حبيب الرهانيا, romanized: Ḥabīb al-rhanīyya; c. AD 307–322), also known as Abibus the New, Habib the Deacon or Saint Habibus the Martyr, was a 4th-century Syrian Christian deacon, confessor and martyr, who according to the Martyrdom of Habib the Deacon, was executed at Edessa by immolation under Roman Emperor Licinius. He is venerated as a saint by the Catholic, Eastern Orthodox and Oriental Orthodox Churches.

== Biography ==
=== Early life ===
Abibus was born in Edessa (modern-day Urfa, Turkey), in the Roman province of Osroene, in about AD 307 to Christian parents and worked as a tradesman during his early years. He was ordained a deacon at age 14, which was considered a legal adult in classical antiquity.

=== Decree by the Emperor ===
The Emperor made a decree to have Abibus arrested for his preaching and spreading of Christianity. Due to the large jewish and pagan support he received, Abibus was quoted as having said: "If I remain in secret, others will be forced to receive the crown of martyrdom against their will and what respect will one have in our faith if one does not accept it willingly? Death is before man wherever he goes, such is the fate of all children of adam." Not wanting any Christian or non-Christian to have had to endure any suffering due to his search warrant, Abibus complied with the decree and appeared in front of his executioners: "I am Habib of Edessa, the one whom you are inquiring for."

=== Torture and discourse with the Governor ===
During his multiple days of torture, Abibus was subjected to the scourging and combing of five men. When threatened with more gruesome torture by the governor, the saint is quoted as saying: "As a tree that is watered bears fruit, so is my spirit strengthened by torment", frustrated by his powerless efforts, the Governor replied: "Does your faith teach you to hate your own body?", to which Abibus replied: "We do not hate this material body, but we rejoice in the spiritual reality; the suffering of this present time is not worth comparing with the glory that awaits those who embrace Christ." The governor mockingly replied: "Is this suffering you endure glorious?" Abibus responded: "It is not for you to ask questions, for your unbelief is not worthy to hear the answers to them, as the Scripture teaches us: do not cast that which is holy to dogs, nor pearls before swine."

=== Execution, burial and hagiographical tradition ===
Abibus was sentenced to be burned at the stake. When walking up to the stake, his mother was forced to walk beside him, dressed in all-white as if going to a feast day. He blessed the crowd before him, to which the crowd responded: "Pray for us in the presence of the Lord!" After this exchange, the martyr entered the fire on his own accords.

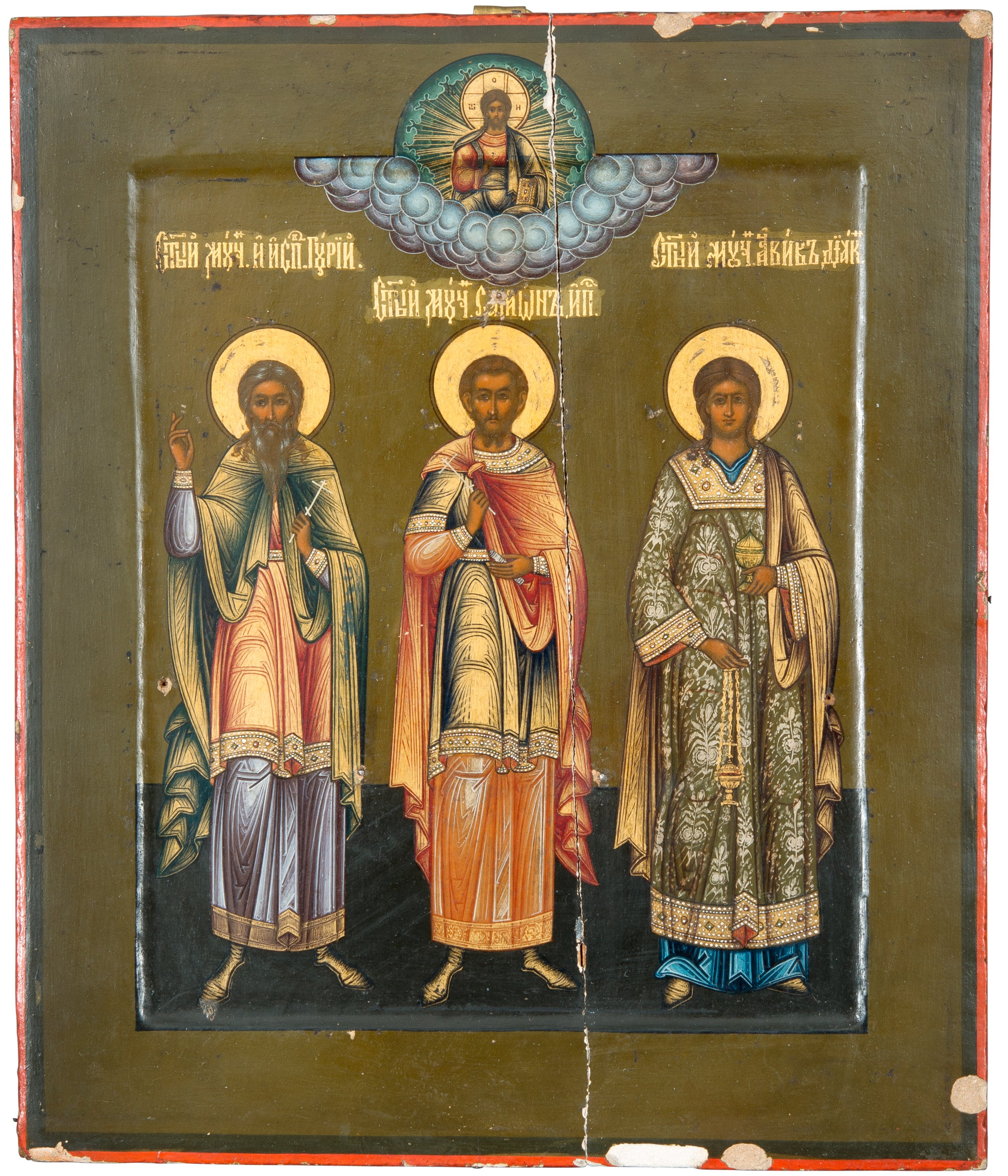
Saint Habib is often symbolically linked to Saints Gurias and Samonas, with whom he was buried on the 15th November, the day of their Martyrdom

After the flames were extinguished, his body was found undamaged by his mother and relatives. According to the Synaxarium, a group of local Christians, Jews and Pagans took his relics and buried them with those of the fellow martyrs Gurias and Samonas during the year 322 AD at a Church in Roman Syria called Beith Elaha Cucla, which is believed to be modern-day Habib-i Neccar Mosque. Alongside Gurias and Samonas, he is venerated as one of the "avengers of unfulfilled contracts" and a patron saint of firefighters.

== In Euphemia and the Goth ==
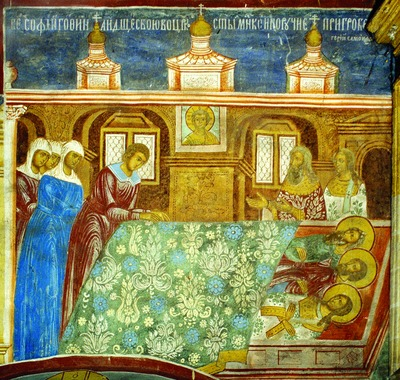
17th-century Russian mural depicting the story of Euphemia and the Goth with the relics of Abibus, Gurias and Samonas in the center

=== Brief summary ===
Euphemia and the Goth is a romance text of Syriac literature that recounts a narrative wherein a Gothic soldier in the Roman army is stationed at Edessa to help repel the Huns, and is billeted with a widow named Sophia, whose only daughter, Euphemia, he wishes to marry. Sophia takes him to the tomb of the Confessor Habib, where she makes him promise to protect Euphemia.

The Goth takes Euphemia to his home only to have her enslaved to his Gothic wife. The Goth tells her to do with the baby as she wishes. Euphemia's infant is then killed by the jealous wife, who put poison in its food. When Euphemia does the same to her, she is shut in the tomb of the wife, but after praying for the intercession of Habib, she miraculously wakes up back next to tomb of Habib and returns to her mother Sophia in Edessa.

The Goth sometime later returns to Edessa and is confronted by Euphemia and Sophia. Both make an affidavit against him concerning Euphemia's affliction, and though the bishop of Edessa Eulogius intervened, the Stratelates of Edessa has the Goth beheaded.

== Feast and other traditions ==
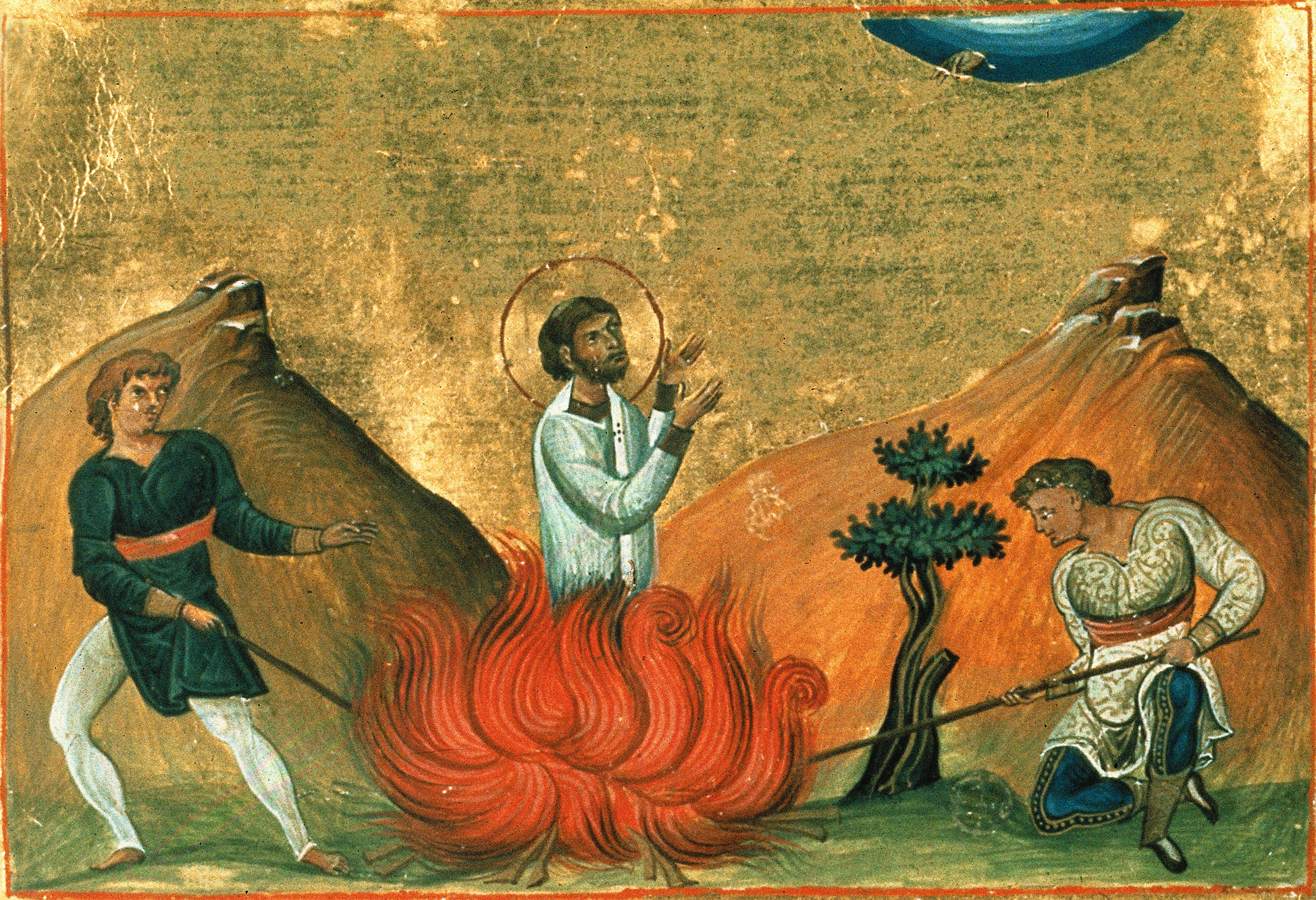
Depiction of Abibus of Edessa from the Menologion of Basil II

=== Feast day ===
Abibus' individual feast day is 2 September in the Oriental Orthodox martyrology. In the Eastern Orthodox Church and Roman Catholic Church he is celebrated on 15 November together with Gurias and Samonas, with whom he was buried. While Samonas and Gurias commonly share a feast-day in most Christian calendars, Abibus of Edessa usually has an individual feast day.

=== Traditions ===
In Russia and other Slavic countries such as Serbia, an icon of Abibus is often given as a wedding present or is present at weddings, because the martyr is considered to be the protector of contracts, agreements and pacts for complying with the Emperor's Decree, this is believed to include virtuous and chaste marriages, as well as prenuptial agreements.

== Sources ==
- Holweck, F. G. A Biographical Dictionary of the Saints. St. Louis, MO: B. Herder Book Co. 1924.
