= Orounta =

Orounta: Ορούντα (Greek); Orunda (Turkish)
- Village
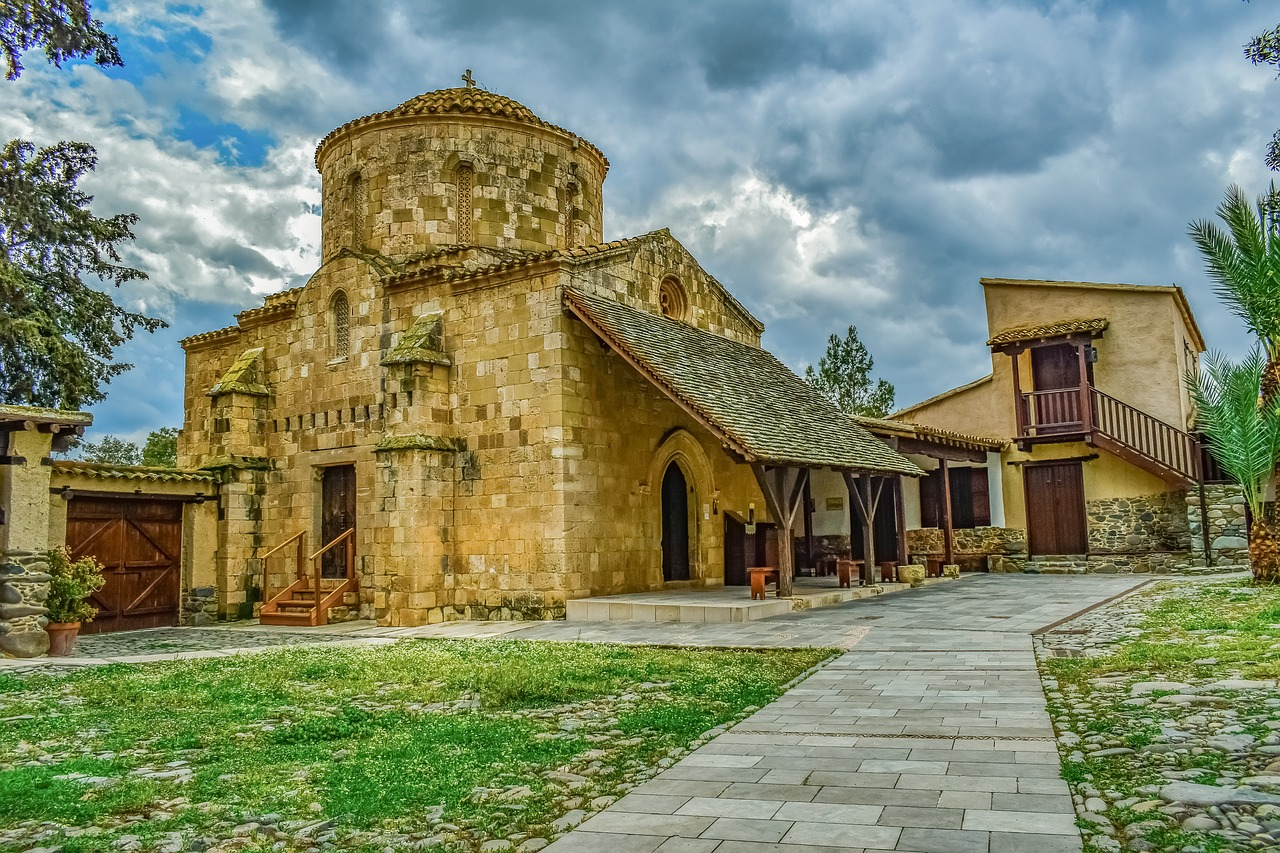

- Location in Cyprus
- Coordinates: 35°6′5″N 33°5′38″E
- Country: Cyprus
- District: Nicosia District

Population (2001)
  - Total: 656
- Time zone: UTC+2 (EET)
  - Summer (DST): UTC+3 (EEST)
- Postal code: 2779

Orounta (Greek: Ορούντα; Turkish: Orunda) is a village located in the Nicosia District of Cyprus, west of Nicosia, near Peristerona.

It was the birthplace of the Saint Martyr Saint Philoumenos (Greek: Άγιος Φιλούμενος) (15 October 1913 – 29 November 1979), who was the Guardian of Jacob's Well, in the West Bank, where he was killed after the assailant threw grenades into the Church of Saint Photini and attacked him with an axe.
