= November 29 (Eastern Orthodox liturgics) =

Day in the Eastern Orthodox liturgical calendar

Eastern Orthodox liturgical calendar
November 28	November 29	November 30
November 29 O.S. ≍ December 12 N.S. November 29 N.S ≍ November 16 O.S.

An Eastern Orthodox cross

November 29 in Eastern Orthodox liturgical calendars is a feast day and a day of commemoration of saints and martyrs. Although some Orthodox churches use the Revised Julian Calendar and others use the traditional Julian calendar, the fixed commemorations for their respective November 29 are broadly the same, no matter which calendar is used. (Note: Despite the dates being the same, the days to which they refer typically differ by 13 days. The notation Old Style or O.S. is sometimes used to indicate a date in the traditional Julian Calendar (the "Old Calendar"). The notation New Style or N.S. indicates a date in the Revised Julian calendar (the "New Calendar").)

== Saints ==
- Venerable Nicholas, Archbishop of Thessaloniki (c. 160) (Note: See: (in Greek) Ιερά Μητρόπολις Θεσσαλονίκης. Βικιπαίδεια. (Greek Wikipedia).)
- Hieromartyr Dionysius, Bishop of Corinth (182)
- Martyrs Paramon and 370 others, at Bithynia (250)
- Martyr Philoumenos of Ancyra (274), (Note: "At Ancyra, St. Philomenus, martyr. During the persecution of the emperor Aurelian, under the governor Felix, he was first exposed to the flames, then having his hands, feet and head pierced with nails, consummated his martyrdom.") and with him:

- Martyr Valerian, by the sword (274)
- Martyr Phaedrus, by pouring hot resin over him (274) (Note: Name days celebrated today include: Phaedra (Φαίδρα).)

- Hieromartyr John, in Persia (4th century) (Note: This is likely the same individual as the one celebrated on November 1 and April 10.)
- Holy 6 Martyrs who entered a rock which wondrously opened and received them (Note: It is unknown when and where they were martyred. However according to the tradition, when they were being persecuted, a stone opened up and they entered inside it.)
- Venerable Pitirim of Egypt (4th century), disciple of Saint Anthony the Great
- Saint Tiridates III (IV), King of Armenia (4th century) (Note: In 301, Tiridates proclaimed Christianity as the state religion of Armenia, making the Armenian kingdom the first state to embrace Christianity officially.)
- Saint Acacius of Sinai (6th century), mentioned by John of the Ladder (see also: November 26)
- Hieromartyr Abibus, Bishop of Nekresi, Georgia (6th century)
- Bishop Urban of Macedonia (Note: Possibly the same individual as Saint Romanus, Bishop of Macedonia, who is commemorated a day earlier on November 28.)
- Venerable Pankosmios (Pancosmius) the Ascetic
- Venerable Mark (Note: His memory is preserved in the Synaxarion of Delehaye. He left behind a wife, children and relatives to become a monk. He wandered the desert, cities and villages, and came to Egypt, where he was found dead in a temple, carrying heavy irons upon him. When the people saw this they were amazed at his asceticism. Thus they constructed a wooden coffin where they placed his body along with the heavy irons that he wore in life.)

== Pre-Schism Western saints ==
- Hieromartyr Saturninus, venerated as the first Bishop of Toulouse (c. 257) (Note: A missionary who enlightened the area around Pampeluna (Pamplona) in Navarre in Spain and then the area and city of Toulouse in France. He is venerated as the first Bishop of Toulouse. By tradition he was martyred in the persecution of Valerian by being fastened to a wild bull which dragged him about until he was torn to pieces.) (Note: "At Toulouse, in the time of Decius, the holy bishop Saturninus, who was confined by the Pagans in the capitol of that city, and from the highest part of the building precipitated down the stairs; by which fall, having his head crushed, his brains dashed out and his whole body mangled, he rendered his worthy soul to our Lord.")
- Saint Blaise and Demetrius, martyrs in Veroli in central Italy
- Hieromartyrs Saturninus and Sisinius (c. 309) (Note: According to tradition Saturninus was a priest in Rome, though born in Carthage. He and his deacon Sisinius were sentenced to hard labour and subsequently martyred. They were buried in the cemetery of St Thraso on the Salarian Way.) (Note: "At Rome, on the Salarian road, the birthday of the holy martyr Saturninus, an aged man, and the deacon Sisinius, in the time of the emperor Maximian. After a long imprisonment, they were, by order of the prefect of the city, placed on the rack, distended with ropes, scourged with rods and whips garnished with metal, then exposed to the flames, taken down from the rack and beheaded.")
- Saint Illuminata, a virgin in Todi in Italy (c. 320)
- Saint Brendan of Birr (571) (Note: A contemporary of St Brendan the Voyager and a disciple of St Finian at Clonard. His monastery of Birr was in Offaly in Ireland. He was a friend and advisor of St Columba, who saw the soul of St Brendan carried by angels to heaven at the moment of his repose.)
- Saint Sadwrn (Sadwen), hermit, brother of St Illtyd and disciple of St Cadfan (6th century) (Note: A number of churches in Wales are dedicated to him.)
- Saint Hardoin, Bishop of Saint-Pol-de-Léon in Brittany (7th century)
- Saint Æthelwine of Athelney (Egelwine, Aylwine), a prince of the house of Wessex who lived as a hermit at Athelney in Somerset, England (7th century) (Note: "ST EGELWINE was a brother of Kenewalch, King of the West Saxons, but more illustrious for his eminent sanctity than for his royal birth. He was continually afflicted with sickness, but did not on that account relax his fervent resolution of serving God in Christian perfection. The holy man persevered in this course till his blessed death, and after that by his miracles and availing intercession continued to show himself the watchful protector of those who had recourse to him. The Abbey of Athelney was not erected until a later period; but it was there that the memory of St. Egelwine was held in especial veneration.")
- Saint Walderic, founder of the monastery of Murrhardt in Germany (c. 817)
- Saint Radboud, Bishop of Utrecht (917)
- Saint Gulstan (Gustan, Constans), a monk at St Gildas of Rhuys in Brittany (c. 1010)

== Post-Schism Orthodox saints ==
- Saint Nectarius the Obedient of the Kiev Caves (12th century)
- Saint Mardarije Uskoković of Libertyville, Illinois, Enlightener and Apostle of the Church in America (1935) (Note: Canonized in 2015. See also: (in Russian) Мардарий (Ускокович). Википедии. (Russian Wikipedia).) (see also: December 12)

=== New martyrs and confessors ===
- New Hieromartyr Sergius Kochurov, Priest (1941)
- New Hieromartyr Momčilo Grgurević, Priest (1945)
- New Hieromartyr Philoumenos (Hasapis) of Jacob's Well (1979) (Note: He was martyred on November 29, 1979, the same feast day as his patron Saint, Philoumenus of Ancyra (274). He was canonized on September 11, 2009 by the Patriarchate of Jerusalem, with this canonization being reaffirmed on March 5, 2010 by the Holy Synod of the Patriarchate of Russia as well: (in Russian): 5 марта 2010 года Священный синод Русской православной церкви постановил: «включить имя священномученика Филумена (Хасаписа) в месяцеслов Русской Православной Церкви с установлением празднования его памяти 16/29 ноября, как это установлено в Иерусалимской Церкви». Both Patriarchates placed his feast day on November 16 (ns) / 29 (os). However churches on the New Calendar place his feast day directly on November 29 (ns).) (see also: November 16 - O.S.)

== Other commemorations ==
- Consecration of the Church of the Holy Martyrs Sergius and Bacchus
- Repose of Blessed Abel "the Prophet", of Valaam Monastery (1831)

== Icon gallery ==
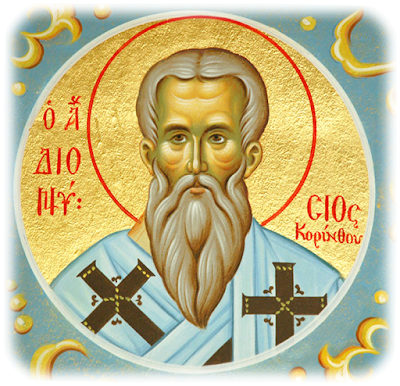
Hieromartyr Dionysius, Bishop of Corinth.

Martyr Philoumenos of Ancyra.
(Menologion of Basil II, 10th century).

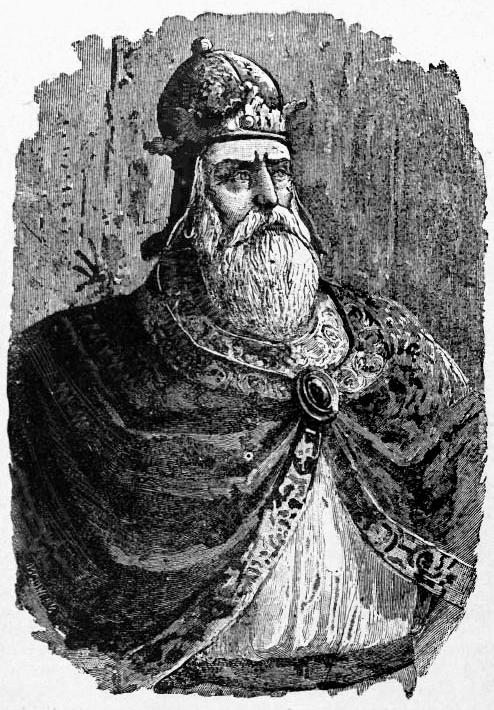
St. Tiridates, King of Armenia.

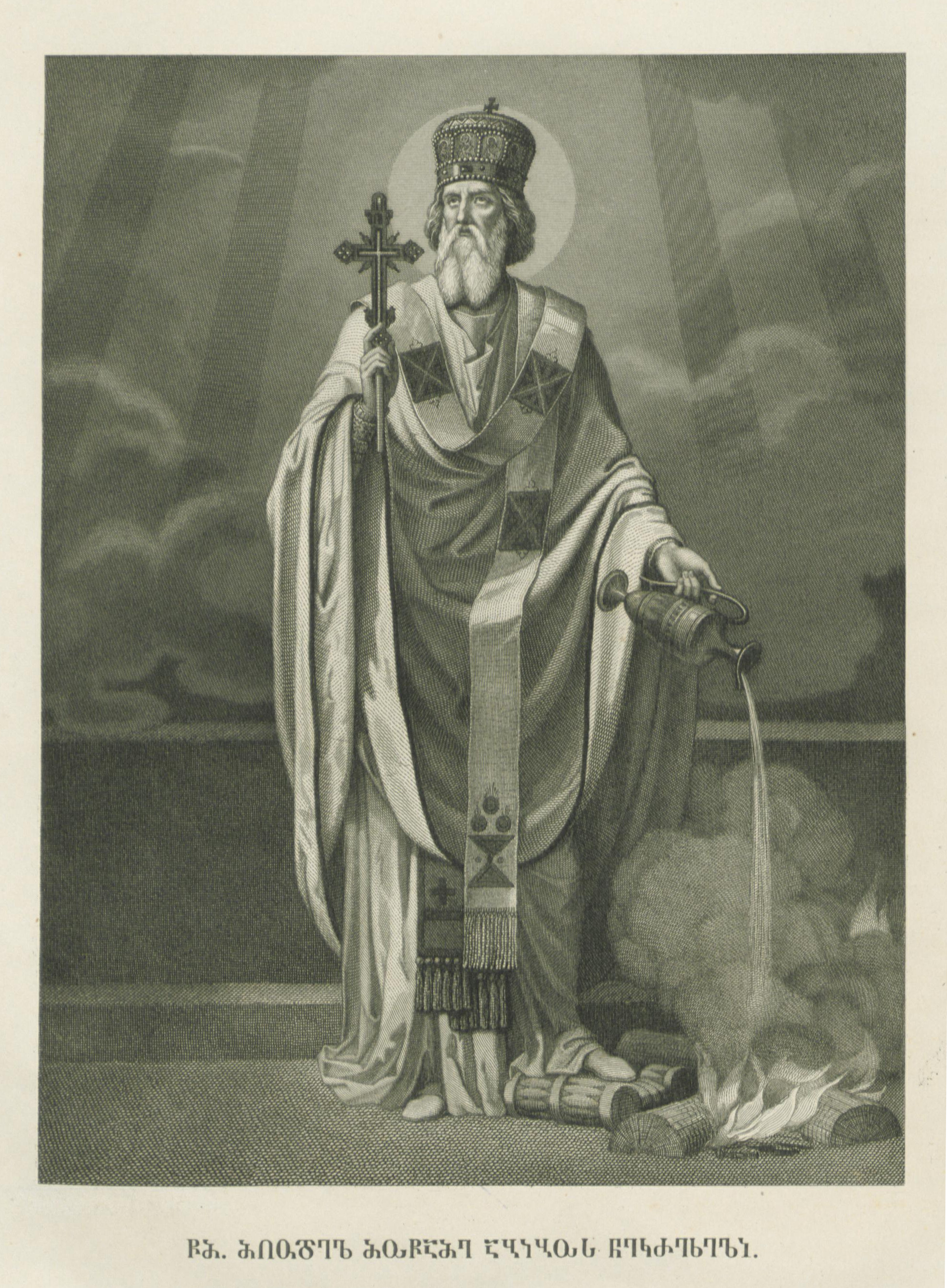
Hieromartyr Abibus, Bishop of Nekresi, Georgia.

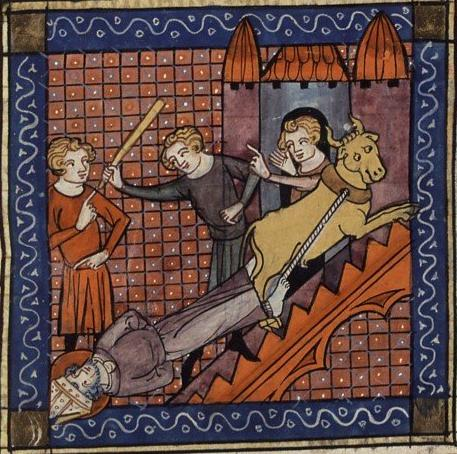
The Martyrdom of Saint Saturninus.

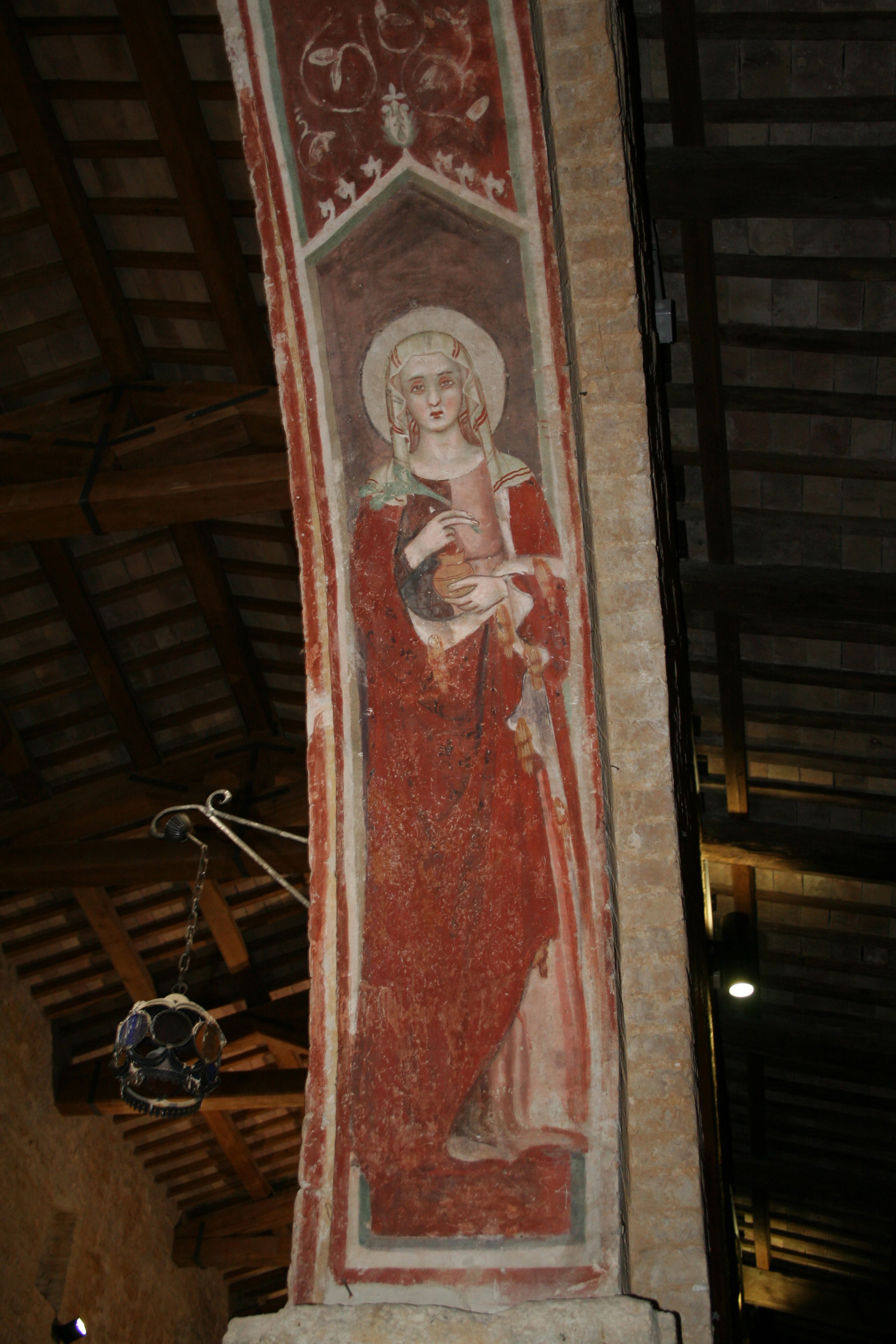
St. Illuminata.

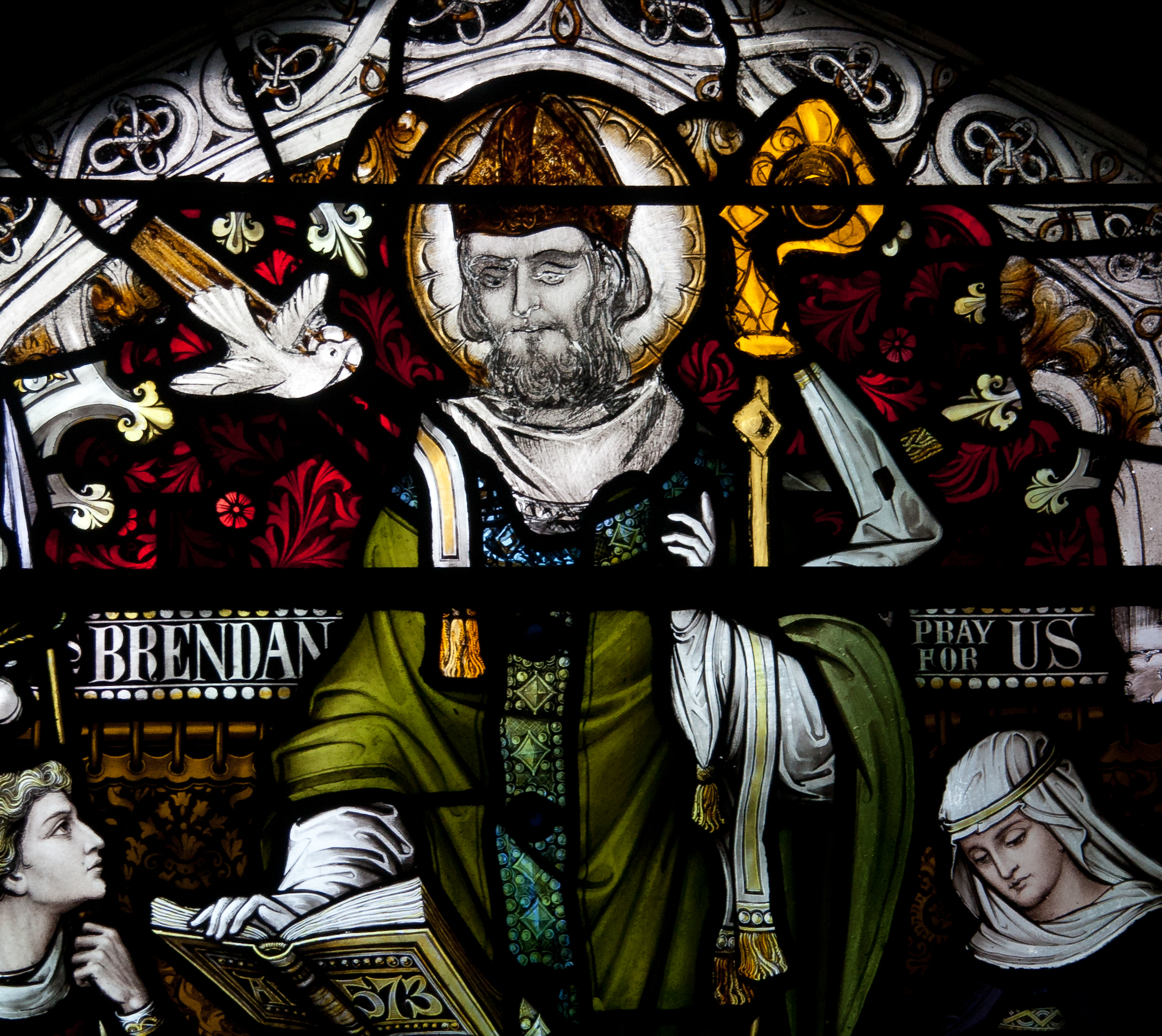
St. Brendan of Birr.

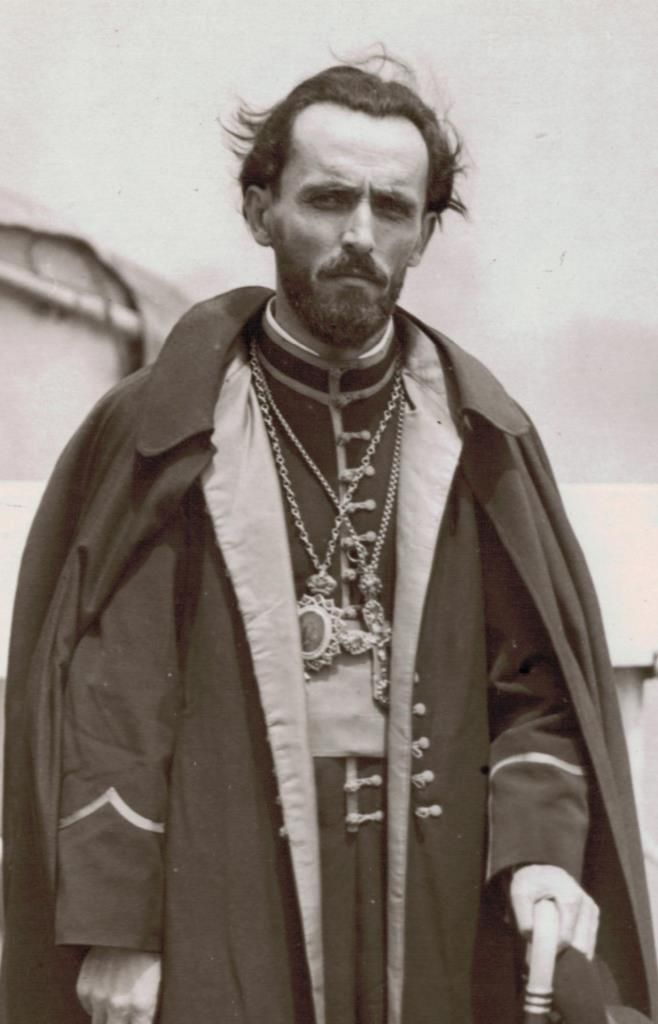
St. Mardarije (Uskokovich) of Libertyville, Illinois.

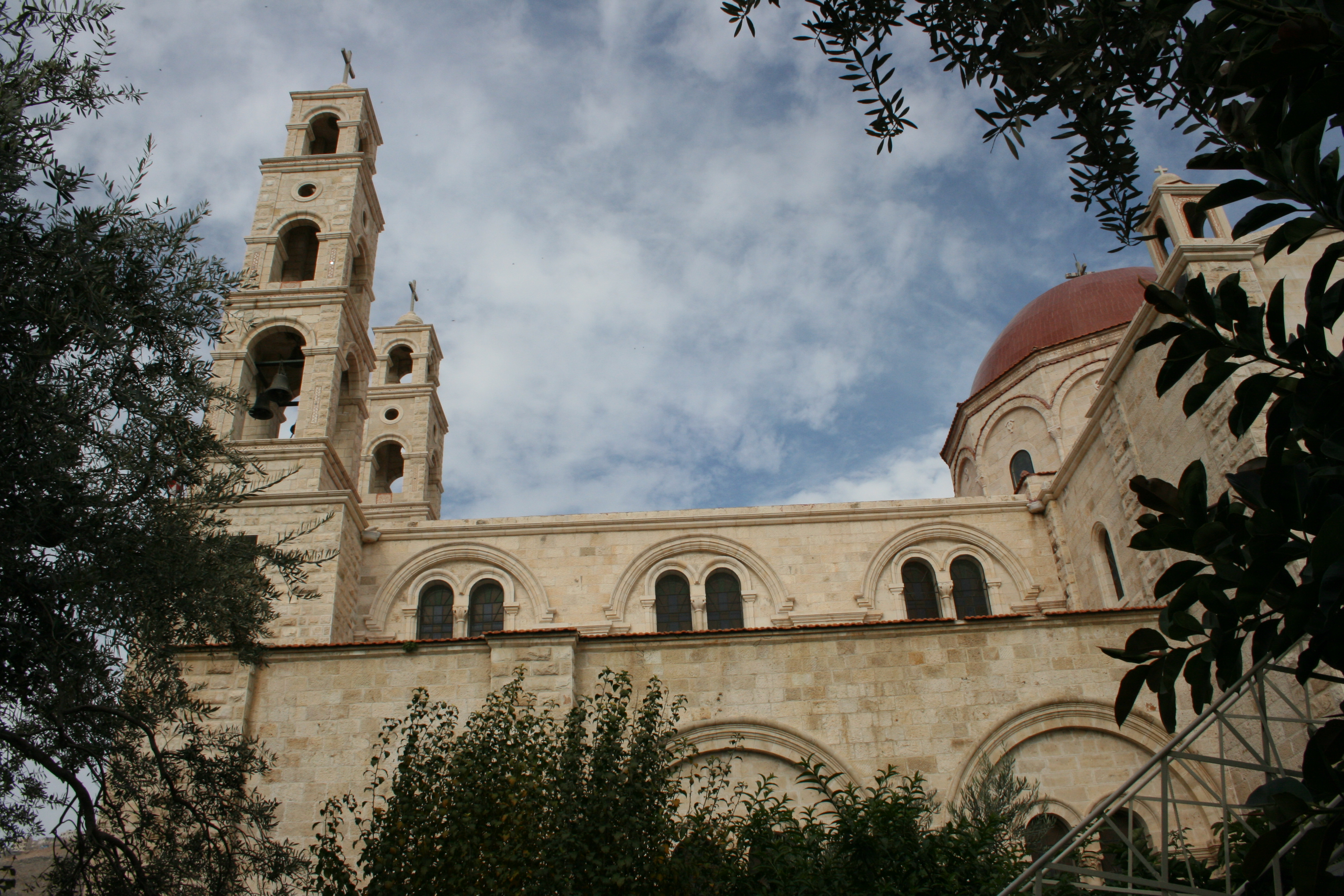
Greek Orthodox Church of St. Photini the Samaritan Woman, built over the site of Jacob's Well, where St. Philoumenos was martyred in 1979.

== Sources ==
- November 29 / December 12. Orthodox Calendar (PRAVOSLAVIE.RU).
- December 12 / November 29. Holy Trinity Russian Orthodox Church (A parish of the Patriarchate of Moscow).
- November 29. OCA - The Lives of the Saints.
- The Autonomous Orthodox Metropolia of Western Europe and the Americas (ROCOR). St. Hilarion Calendar of Saints for the year of our Lord 2004. St. Hilarion Press (Austin, TX). p. 89.
- The Twenty-Ninth Day of the Month of November. Orthodoxy in China.
- November 29. Latin Saints of the Orthodox Patriarchate of Rome.
- The Roman Martyrology. Transl. by the Archbishop of Baltimore. Last Edition, According to the Copy Printed at Rome in 1914. Revised Edition, with the Imprimatur of His Eminence Cardinal Gibbons. Baltimore: John Murphy Company, 1916. p. 368.
- Rev. Richard Stanton. A Menology of England and Wales, or, Brief Memorials of the Ancient British and English Saints Arranged According to the Calendar, Together with the Martyrs of the 16th and 17th Centuries. London: Burns & Oates, 1892. pp. 569–572.

Greek Sources

- Great Synaxaristes: (in Greek) 29 ΝΟΕΜΒΡΙΟΥ. ΜΕΓΑΣ ΣΥΝΑΞΑΡΙΣΤΗΣ.
- (in Greek) Συναξαριστής. 29 Νοεμβρίου. ECCLESIA.GR. (H ΕΚΚΛΗΣΙΑ ΤΗΣ ΕΛΛΑΔΟΣ).

Russian Sources

- (in Russian) 12 декабря (29 ноября). Православная Энциклопедия под редакцией Патриарха Московского и всея Руси Кирилла (электронная версия). (Orthodox Encyclopedia - Pravenc.ru).
- (in Russian) 29 ноября (ст.ст.) 12 декабря 2014 (нов. ст.). Русская Православная Церковь Отдел внешних церковных связей. (DECR).
- (in Russian) 29 ноября по старому стилю / 12 декабря по новому стилю. Русская Православная Церковь - Православный церковный календарь на 2018 год.
