= Asher Raby =

Israeli serial killer

- אשר רבי
- Born: 1946 (age 79–80); Jerusalem, Mandatory Palestine
- Conviction: N/A (Not guilty by reason of insanity)
- Penalty: Involuntary commitment

Details
- Victims: 5
- Span of crimes: March – November 1979
- Country: Israel
- States: Tel Aviv, Central, Nablus
- Date apprehended: 17 November 1982

Asher Raby (Hebrew: אשר רבי; born 1946) is an Israeli serial killer. Subsequently declared insane, he killed five people in several attacks committed across Israel and the West Bank from March to November 1979, with the most prominent of them being Philoumenos Hasapis, the Greek Orthodox hegumen of Jacob's Well. Deemed unfit to stand trial for his crimes, he was acquitted by reason of insanity and confined to a psychiatric facility.

== Early life ==
Asher Raby was born in Jerusalem, Mandatory Palestine in 1946, the eldest of six children born to Afghan Jewish immigrants. He spent his childhood and teenage years in Jerusalem before the entire family moved to Tel Aviv, settling in the city's Shapira neighborhood. Sometime after their move, Raby's father died, and he took over as the main caretaker for his underage siblings.

After becoming an adult, he was drafted into the Israel Defense Forces, where he served in the C4I Corps. After his release, he worked as a truck driver transporting construction materials. He served as part of a reserve unit during the Yom Kippur War. After the war, his mental health rapidly deteriorated, resulting in Raby quitting his job and becoming very religious. According to neighbours, he would go out at night and cry over the destruction of the ancient Holy Temple, would not talk on Saturdays or drink tap water, instead harvesting rainwater from his yard. His clothes were usually torn and slovenly, and he rarely bathed. He sold his truck and car and donated most of the money to yeshivas, using the remainder to purchase a Torah scroll. At some point during the mid-1970s, he opened a grocery store but sold it only three months later after the business failed.

== Murders ==
On 7 March 1979, Raby went to a clinic on 109 Rothschild Boulevard in Tel Aviv and entered the office of Dr. David Kogan, a general practitioner and gynaecologist who worked there. Kogan had a storied history in the city, as he was known for performing abortions and for being an accomplice in a 1962 tax evasion scheme in which he and two other men who worked at a hospital for mentally-impaired children in Ramla attempted to evade IL137,000 in taxes. In that case, he was fined IL50,000 and given a 4-month suspended sentence.

Raby was seen entering the doctor's office by a couple who took notice of his slovenly and unkempt appearance. Inside, he waited until Kogan had bent down to examine him, before he pulled out a small axe he had concealed in his coat and hit the doctor on the head, killing him instantly. After the murder, Raby calmly left the clinic, leaving Kogan's wife to find his body later that day. While his body was sent to the Abu Kabir Forensic Institute for an autopsy, a team of investigators spearheaded by Superintendent Shmuel Carmeli looked into the patient records in an attempt to locate any possible clue to who might have killed him and when, but found nothing of value. Further investigation focused on the possibility that Kogan might have been killed for botching an abortion attempt, but yet again, this line of inquiry did not lead to an arrest.

On 10 April, Raby went to the house of the Badra family in Lod. He had attacked them on a previous occasion, approximately two weeks before killing Kogan, and in that case, he had stabbed some of the children and their grandmother Fatma Badra, but failed to kill them and was forced to flee. At around 6:30 PM, he broke into their apartment and went to the bedroom, where he encountered the 37-year-old wife Abigail tending to two of her children. Raby pulled out a grenade and dropped it in the middle of the room. The explosion destroyed one of the walls and injured the children with shrapnel, causing them to burst out crying. This alerted the father, 40-year-old Ahmad, who came to their aid, but was confronted by Raby and gunned down with an Uzi. Abigail went to see what happened but was also shot and severely injured. The two girls who accompanied their mother, 17-year-old Mona and 9-year-old Marilyn, were subsequently gunned down as well. The surviving children (13-year-old Ronit, 16-year-old Lillian and 1-year-old Fouad) and the mother were later driven to a hospital, where they managed to recover from their injuries. After the killings, Raby attempted to run away but was apprehended by two neighbours; however, he threatened to set off a hand grenade he had stolen from an IDF barracks, forcing the men to release him before they could get a good look at him.

In the aftermath of the attacks, police attempted to uncover a possible motive. Ahmad, an Egyptian Muslim, worked at a local Tnuva store and traded in plastic products, while his wife Abigail, a native of Acre, was an ethnic Jewish convert to Islam who had claimed that she had divine powers and could tell people's fortunes, perform witchcraft and even heal people's injuries. While authorities attempted to locate potential clues, three days after the murders, a tractor driver reported that he had seen a suspicious man wearing an army uniform and armed with an Uzi sleeping under a tree in a field not far off from the Badra family household. Upon attempting to approach the man, he was seemingly spooked and fled. The tractor driver provided a description of the man, describing him as about 35 years old, with long hair, a moustache and a beard, a slightly elongated face and a kippah. In July, the police announced a large monetary reward for anyone who could provide information leading to the arrest of a suspect, but nothing fruitful came out of this.

=== Murder of Philoumenos Hasapis ===
On 30 November 1979, Raby approached the Bir Ya'qub monastery in Nablus and jumped over the fence. Upon entering the building, he came across the 66-year-old Philoumenos, who was on his way to enter the confessional. Raby then pulled out a grenade and tossed it at him, destroying a nearby wall and injuring the monk, who somehow managed to survive. Believing that he would identify him if he let him live, Raby then grabbed his axe and crashed it down on Philoumenos' head, killing him instantly. After leaving the monastery, he went to a nearby military camp and, pretending to be homeless, was transferred to the Sheba Medical Center in Tel Aviv.

Authorities were quickly dispatched to the crime scene and arrested eight suspects, including one of the monastery's security guards, all of whom were residents of the Askar refugee camp. Each of the suspects' alibis was confirmed after interrogation, and all were released without any charges. Philoumenos' killing became a media sensation not only in Israel, but across the globe, with many rejecting the police's conclusion that the attack was criminal in nature and was instead the work of Zionists. Publications associated with the Greek Orthodox Church claimed that a week before the murder, a group of Zionists had gone to the monastery and claimed that it was a holy Jewish site, demanding that all the icons and crosses be removed at once. Supposedly, Father Philoumenos rebuked their claims and refused to comply, with the group threatening him before leaving. According to this version of events, that same group later returned and broke inside the monastery, pinning down and torturing the monk in an attempt to have him renounce his religion. It was claimed that they supposedly pricked his eyes, chopped off the fingers on his right hand and eventually killed him, before defacing the church with writing inscriptions and Zionist symbols and finally leaving.

== Trial and aftermath ==
On 17 November 1982, Raby attempted to climb the walls of the Bir Ya'qub monastery again but was caught in the act by a monk, who immediately called the police. After being arrested, he was brought to the police station where, after a brief interrogation, he confessed to murdering a priest in 1979 and to attempting to murder a nun in April 1982. In that case, he came across Arad Sirota and a group of pilgrims, and threw a hand grenade at them – fortunately, none were killed. Raby claimed that after this attack, he climbed up Mount Gerizim, where he recited the Torah for two consecutive days. Initially, police were sceptical of his claims, but Raby provided intricate details that eventually linked him to Philoumenos' killing. As the interrogations went on, he admitted to the murders of Kogan and the Badras as well, claiming he had been following divine commands given to him by God, who had instructed him to rid the world of all evil.

The arrest came as a shock to Raby's family and neighbours, all of whom considered him friendly and harmless, even if he was known to be an "eccentric." Fearing the possibility of the trial being downgraded to a media circus due to the fact the murder of Philoumenos was committed beyond the Green Line, a gag order was issued on the case. Raby was initially charged solely in Philoumenos' murder, with charges for the remaining killings left pending for possible future trials, with the first case set to take place at the court in Nazareth. However, this never took place, as a psychiatric examination conducted on Raby concluded that he was unfit to stand trial due to his unstable mental health, and because of this, the presiding judge ordered that he be confined to a mental institution. As Israeli law mandates confidentiality of a mental patient's status, nothing further is known of Raby's fate, and if he is still alive, he presumably remains in psychiatric care.

== See also ==
- List of serial killers by country
