= Philoumenos (Hasapis) of Jacob's Well =

Cypriot saint

Saint Saint Philoumenos (Hasapis)

New-Hieromartyr of Jacob's Well
- Born: 15 October 1913; Orounta, Morphou, British Cyprus
- Died: 29 November 1979; Nablus, West Bank
- Venerated in: Eastern Orthodox Church
- Canonized: 11 September 2009 by Patriarchate of Jerusalem; 5 March 2010 by Patriarchate of Russia
- Feast: 16 November (os) / 29 November (ns)

Philoumenos (Hasapis) of Jacob's Well (Greek: Φιλούμενος Χασάπης; Φιλούμενος ο Κύπριος; or Φιλούμενος Ορουντιώτης, 15 October 1913 – 29 November 1979) was the Hegumen of the Greek Orthodox monastery of Jacob's Well, (Note: (in Greek): Αγιοταφίτης Αρχιμανδρίτης Φιλούμενος, καθηγούμενος της Ιεράς Μονής του Φρέατος του Ιακώβ.) from the city of Nablus (Neapolis) in the West Bank. He was murdered on 29 November 1979 by an Israeli Jewish man.

== Life ==
Sophocles Hasapis was born on 15 October 1913, in the village of Orounta in the province of Morphou, in Cyprus.

At the age of 14, he and his twin brother, the future Archimandrite Elpidios, left their home to become monks at the Stavrovouni Monastery in Cyprus where they stayed for 6 years and then left for the Holy Land to continue their monastic life and attended the local High School. He was ordained a priest and became a trusted priest of the Patriarchate of Jerusalem, later being raised to the office of archimandrite.

In 1979, he was assigned as the guardian of the Monastery of Jacob's Well.

== Death ==
Philoumenos was murdered on 29 November 1979. His assailant, Asher Raby (spelled "Rabi" in some newspaper accounts), a mentally ill 37-year-old resident of Tel Aviv, had intruded the monastery and threw a hand grenade inside, which caused substantial damage. Philoumenos is said by investigators to have been fleeing the explosion and fire caused by the grenade when he was pursued by Raby and hit multiple times with an axe. Investigators stated that Philoumenos appeared to have been trying to protect his face with his hands when a blow to his face or head severed one finger on each hand. Raby escaped the scene of the crime undetected. Raby was subsequently found to have acted alone, "without any connection to a religious or political entity."

An investigation launched by the Israeli police initially failed to identify the killer. Raby was arrested on 17 November 1982 as he again attempted to enter the Monastery at Jacob's Well illicitly by climbing over a wall; he was carrying hand grenades. Raby supplied the police with accurate details of his earlier, previously unsolved, crimes. These were the murder of Philoumenos; a March 1979 murder of a Jewish gynecologist in Tel-Aviv; the murder of the family of a woman in Lod, Israel in April 1979 who claimed to have clairvoyant powers; and an assault on a nun at the Jacob's Well holy site in April 1982. The nun was seriously wounded in the attack. Both she and the gynecologist were attacked by axe, according to prosecutors.

Raby, a newly religious Jew, was described as unwashed, dressed in worn-out clothing, and audibly muttered passages of scripture in a strange manner. Psychiatric evaluations found that he was mentally incompetent to stand trial; he was committed to a mental hospital; details of his subsequent whereabouts are restricted by privacy regulations. At a court hearing after his arrest, an Israeli prosecutor told the court that Raby was convinced that the monastery was the site of the ancient Jewish Temple, and that he made an attempt on the life of the nun "in response to a divine command."

=== Erroneous accounts ===
Initial accounts depicted the murder as an anti-Christian hate attack carried out by a group of Jewish settlers, the result being what Maariv described as "a wave of hatred" in Greece. Reports indicating that "radical Jews" had tortured Philoumenos and "cut off the fingers of his hand" before killing him had appeared in Greek newspapers. Maariv also quoted an official in the Greek Orthodox Patriarchate in Jerusalem asserting that "the murder was carried out by radical religious Jews" claiming that "the Well does not belong to Christians but to Jews".

In a 2017 article in the journal Israel Studies, researchers David Gurevich and Yisca Harani found that false accounts blaming the slaying on "settlers" and "Zionist extremists" persisted even after the arrest of the assailant and his confinement in a mental institution, and that there were "patterns of ritual murder accusation in the popular narrative." The same theme was echoed in parts of the Eastern Orthodox community and by some secular sources, including Blackwell's Dictionary of Eastern Christianity, the Encyclopedia of the Israeli-Palestinian Conflict, The Spectator and Times Literary Supplement, as well as Wikipedia.

Gurevich and Harani contended that a 1989 account of the murder, published in Orthodox America, a publication of the Russian Orthodox Church Outside Russia, became the basis of an anti-Semitic ritual murder narrative, according to which a group of anti-Christianity Jews first harassed Philoumenos and destroyed Christian holy objects at the monastery, then murdered him.

== Veneration ==
=== Sanctification ===
In 2009, the Greek Orthodox Patriarchate of Jerusalem recognised him as a holy martyr of the Eastern Orthodox Church, a "new hieromartyr", thirty years after his martyrdom. The "careful" wording of the pronouncement of the Jerusalem Patriarchate that canonized Philoumenos makes no mention of murderer's faith or ethnicity; he is described as a "vile man", a "heterodox fanatic visitor" and, inaccurately, as an individual who "with an axe, opened a deep cut across his forehead, cut off the fingers of his right hand, and upon escaping threw a grenade which ended the Father's life."

=== Relics ===
Philoumenos was buried in Jerusalem in the Orthodox cemetery on Mount Zion. Veneration extended to an alleged exhumation of Philoumenos' body four years after his death by members of the Greek Orthodox Church of Jerusalem who testified that Patriarch Diodoros confirmed that the body was "producing a pleasant fragrance" and that "the rest of the body was incorrupt." The body was translated from the cemetery on Mount Zion to the newly rebuilt pilgrimage church at Jacob's Well in 2008.

Philoumenos' relics have traveled to locations including his home island of Cyprus where they have been venerated.

=== Cyprus church; antisemitic depiction ===
A new church in Nicosia, Cyprus, was dedicated to Philoumenos in 2004. In 2008 reports of an anti-Semitic painting in Cyprus' Machairas Monastery that shows a stereotyped image of an ultra-Orthodox Jew about to attack Philoumenos with an ax produced a promise from Cypriot Church authorities that the painting would be altered to remove the antisemitic imagery; as of 2016 it was still unaltered.

=== Feast day ===
His feast day is celebrated on November 16 (O.S.) / 29 (N.S.), (Note: The notation Old Style or OS is sometimes used to indicate a date in the Julian Calendar (which is used by churches on the "Old Calendar"); the notation New Style or NS, indicates a date in the Revised Julian calendar (which is used by churches on the "New Calendar").) as per the decision of the Patriarchate of Jerusalem in 2009, (Note: "Today, after the completion of thirty years since the day of his martyrdom, based on the Synodic decision of Our Holy and Sacred Synod, we officially place in the Synaxarion, the celebration of this new hieromartyr on this day of his martyrdom, 16/29 November each year, to the benefit of the souls and to the glory of Our Holy Triune God.") seconded by the same resolution by the Patriarchate of Moscow and all Russia in 2010. (Note: (in Russian): 5 марта 2010 года Священный синод Русской православной церкви постановил: «включить имя священномученика Филумена (Хасаписа) в месяцеслов Русской Православной Церкви с установлением празднования его памяти 16/29 ноября, как это установлено в Иерусалимской Церкви».)

Churches on the New Calendar list his feast day directly on 29 November (N.S.).

=== Orthodox hymns ===
Troparion (Tone 3)

Vanquisher of daemons,
dispeller of the powers of darkness,
by thy meekness thou hast inherited the earth
and reignest in the Heavens;
intercede, therefore, with our Merciful God,
that our souls may be saved.

Troparion (Tone 4)

At Jacob's Well you were proved well named:
loving Christ, confessing Him, pouring out your sacred blood.
Being faithful in small things you were set over great.
Worshipping in Spirit and in Truth,
you are now Guardian of the Holy Places forever.

Apolytikion

Τῆς Ὀρούντης τὸν γόνον, νήσου Κύπρου τὸ βλάστημα, καὶ ἱερομάρτυρα νέον Ἰακὼβ θείου Φρέατος, Φιλούμενον, τιμήσωμεν, πιστοί, ὡς πρόμαχον τῆς πίστεως ἡμῶν, καὶ ἀήττητον ὁπλίτην Χριστοῦ τῆς ἀληθείας πόθῳ κράζοντες· Δόξα τῷ σὲ δοξάσαντι Χριστῷ, δόξα τῷ σὲ ἀφθαρτίσαντι, δόξα τῷ σὲ ἡμῖν χειραγωγὸν πρὸς πόλον δείξαντι.

== See also ==
- Gabriel of Białystok
- Violence against Christians in Israel
