= November 16 (Eastern Orthodox liturgics) =

Day in the Eastern Orthodox liturgical calendar

Eastern Orthodox liturgical calendar
November 15	November 16	November 17
November 16 O.S. ≍ November 29 N.S. November 16 N.S ≍ November 3 O.S.

An Eastern Orthodox cross

November 16 in Eastern Orthodox liturgical calendars is a feast day and a day of commemoration of saints and martyrs. Although some Orthodox churches use the Revised Julian Calendar and others use the traditional Julian calendar, the fixed commemorations for their respective November 16 are broadly the same, no matter which calendar is used. (Note: Despite the dates being the same, the days to which they refer typically differ by 13 days. The notation Old Style or O.S. is sometimes used to indicate a date in the traditional Julian Calendar (the "Old Calendar"). The notation New Style or N.S. indicates a date in the Revised Julian calendar (the "New Calendar").)

== Saints ==
- Holy Apostle and Evangelist Matthew (60) (Note: Name days celebrated today include: Matthew (Ματθαῖος).) (Note: "Eusebius says that after our Lord's ascension, S. Matthew preached in Judaea, some add for fifteen years, and then went to foreign nations. Socrates says that it fell to the lot of S. Matthew to go into Ethiopia. But S. Ambrose says that God opened to him the country of the Persians; Isidore of Seville says that he went among the Macedonians, the acts by the pseudo-Abdias say Ethiopia. Heracleon, disciple of Valentine, living in the 2nd century, and the earliest and most trustworthy authority, says that S. Matthew died a natural death, and S. Clement, Origen, and Tertullian say the same. The story of his martyrdom originated much later. S. Matthew's original Gospel in Aramaic consisted of the sayings of the Lord. The Acts of His life were added later.")
- Saint Fulvianus (Fulvian) (in holy baptism Matthew), prince of Ethiopia, (1st century)
- Virgin-martyr Ephigenia of Ethiopia (Iphigenia of Ethiopia) (1st century).
- Hieromartyr Hypatius of Gangra, Bishop of Gangra, Wonderworker (326) (see also: March 31)
- Saint Thomas II the New, Ecumenical Patriarch of Constantinople (668–669) (see also: November 14 and November 15)

== Pre-Schism Western saints ==
- Saint Fidentius Armenus, an early saint in Padua in Italy (2nd century) (Note: "At Padua, St. Fidentius, bishop.")
- Martyrs Elpidius, Marcellus, Eustochius and Companions (362) (Note: An official at the court of the Emperor Constantius, he was demoted by Julian the Apostate. He and others were dragged tied to the tails of wild horses. Finally they were all burnt at the stake.) (Note: "The same day, the holy martyrs Elpidius, Marcellus, Eustochius, and their companions. Elpidius being a senator, and having perseveringly confessed the Christian faith before Julian the Apostate, was, with his companions, first tied to wild horses and dragged by them, and then being thrown into the fire, ended a glorious martyrdom.") (see also: November 15)
- Saint Eucherius of Lyons (449) (Note: He became a monk at Lérins in France in 422 and his wife Galla became a nun. Two of their sons became bishops. In 434 he became Bishop of Lyons and in 441 he presided the Council of Orange with St Hilary and several of his ascetic works still exist.) (Note: "At Lyons, the birthday of St. Eucherius, bishop and confessor, a man of extraordinary faith and learning. He renounced the senatorial dignity to embrace the religious life, and for a long time voluntarily shut himself up in a cavern, where he served Christ in prayer and fasting. Afterwards, through the revelation of an angel, he was solemnly installed in the episcopal chair of the city of Lyons.")
- Saints Rufinus, Mark, Valerius and Companions, martyrs in North Africa.
- Saint Afan, a bishop who gave his name to the church of Llanafan in Powys in Wales (6th century)
- Saint Africus, Bishop of Comminges in France, celebrated for his zeal for Orthodoxy (7th century)
- Saint Gobrain, a monk who became Bishop of Vannes in Brittany and at the age of eighty-seven went to live as a hermit (725)
- Saint Otmar, abbot and monastic founder in Switzerland (759) (Note: Of Germanic origin and already a priest, in 720 he was appointed Abbot of St Gall in Switzerland. Under him a period of prosperity began for the monastery, which soon became the most important in Switzerland. He was persecuted by two lords, unjustly slandered and condemned. He bore his sufferings with great patience, reposing in prison.)
- Saint Lubuinus, missionary to Friesland (773)
- Saint Ælfric of Abingdon (Aelfric), monk and Abbot of Abingdon, later Bishop of Wilton and twenty-ninth Archbishop of Canterbury in 995 (1005) (Note: He governed the Church ably in the critical times of the Danish invasion of Kent.) (Note: "ST. ALFRICK, or ALRIC, professed the monastic life and was made Abbot of Abingdon. From that office he was promoted to be Bishop of Wilton, and lastly, on the death of Siric, he became Archbishop of Canterbury. He is said to have ruled his church in a most religious manner during eleven years, which the incursions of the Danes contributed to make a most difficult time. After that he was called to the reward of his labours, and buried in his Cathedral Church, being counted as one of the many Saints whom God granted to the Metropolitan See.")

== Post-Schism Orthodox saints ==
- Venerable Sergius, Priest and missionary, of Malopinega, Vologda (1585)

=== New martyrs and confessors ===
- New Hieromartyrs Theodore Kolierov, Priest, and with him Martyrs Ananius Boikov and Michael Boldakov (1929)
- New Hieromartyrs Michael Abramov, Protopresbyter, and priests Basil Sokolov, Victor Voronov, John Tsvetkov, Makarius Soloviev and Nicholas Troitsky (1937)
- New Hieromartyr Panteleimon Arzhanykh, Abbot of Optina Monastery (1937)
- Martyr Demetrius Spiridonov (1938) (Note: See: (in Russian) Димитрий Спиридонов. Православная Энциклопедия под редакцией Патриарха Московского и всея Руси Кирилла (электронная версия). (Orthodox Encyclopedia - Pravenc.ru).)
- New Hieromartyr Philoumenos (Hasapis) of Jacob's Well (1979) (Note: He was martyred on November 29, 1979. He was canonized on September 11, 2009 by the Patriarchate of Jerusalem. This canonization was reaffirmed on March 5, 2010 by the Holy Synod of the Patriarchate of Russia as well: (in Russian): 5 марта 2010 года Священный синод Русской православной церкви постановил: «включить имя священномученика Филумена (Хасаписа) в месяцеслов Русской Православной Церкви с установлением празднования его памяти 16/29 ноября, как это установлено в Иерусалимской Церкви». Both Patriarchates placed his feast day on November 16 (ns) / 29 (os). Churches on the New Calendar place his feast day directly on November 29 (ns).) (see also: November 29)

== Other commemorations ==
- Repose of Schemamonk John the Fingerless (1843), disciple of St. Paisius Velichkovsky.

== Icon gallery ==
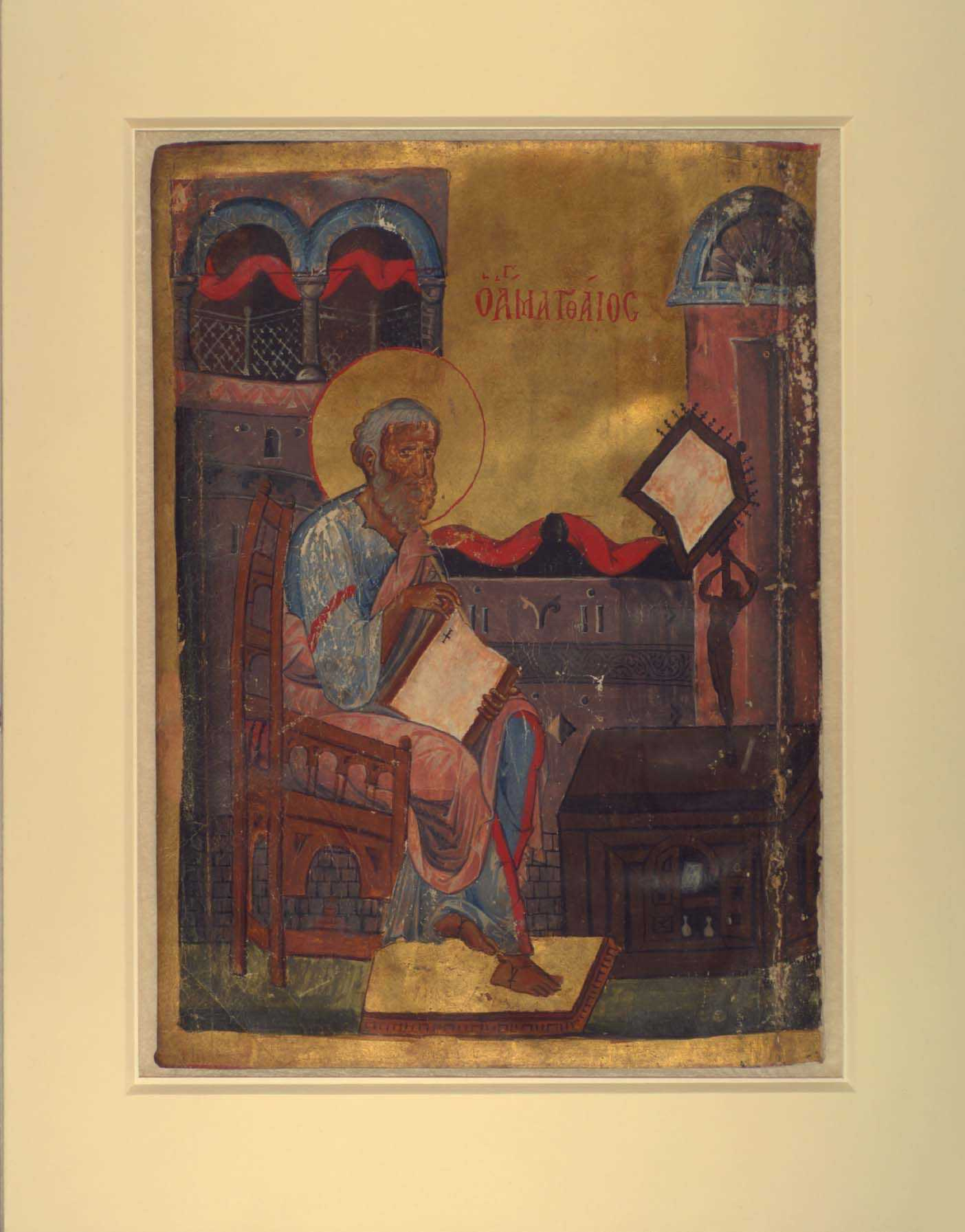
Holy Apostle and Evangelist Matthew.

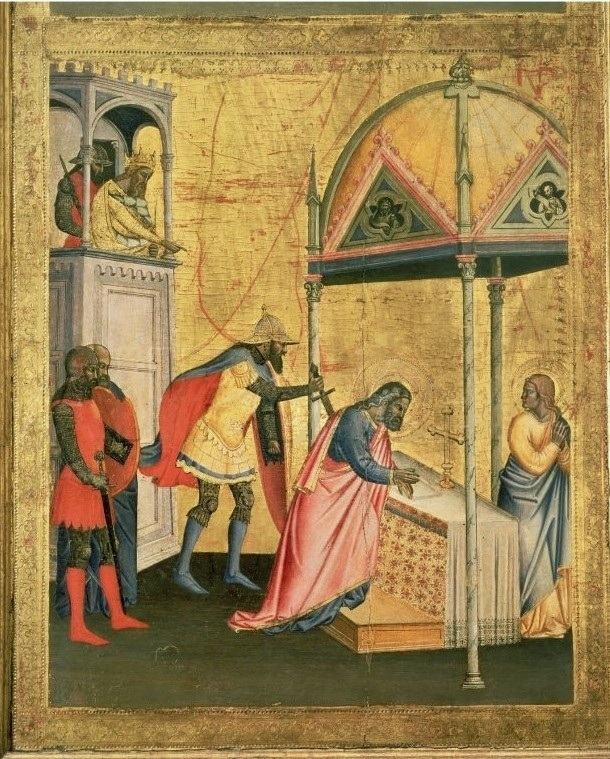
The Martyrdom of St. Matthew, with St. Iphigenia of Ethiopia on the right.
(Altarpiece of St. Matthew, c. 1367–1370).

Holy Apostle and Evangelist Matthew.
(Menologion of Basil II, 10th century).

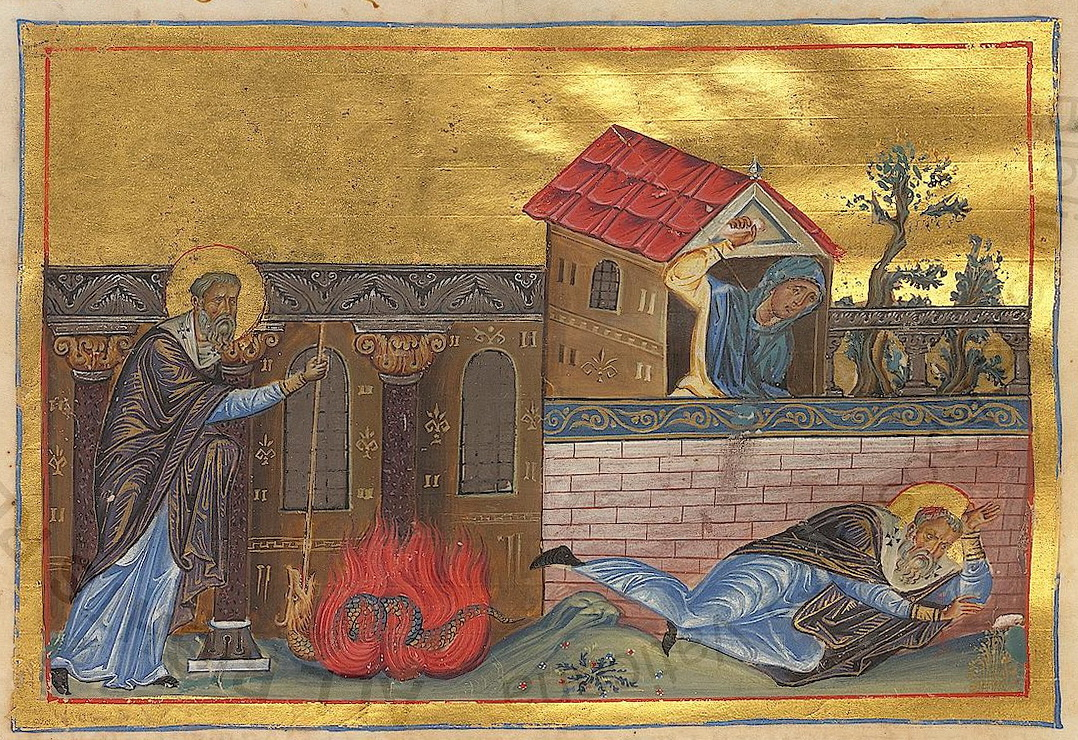
Hieromartyr Hypatius of Gangra.
(Menologion of Basil II, 10th century).

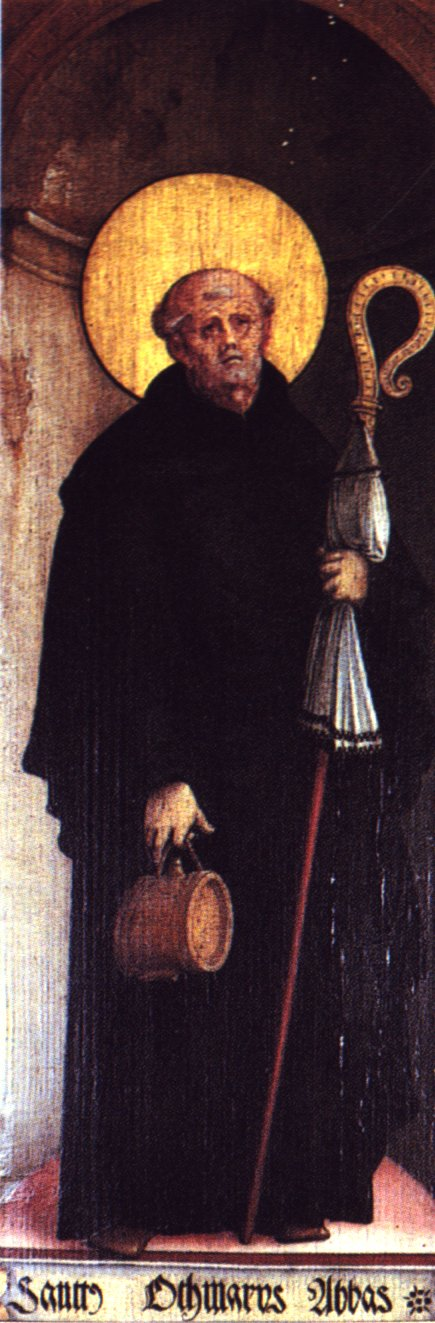
St. Otmar, O.S.B..

New Hieromartyr Michael Abramov, Protopresbyter.

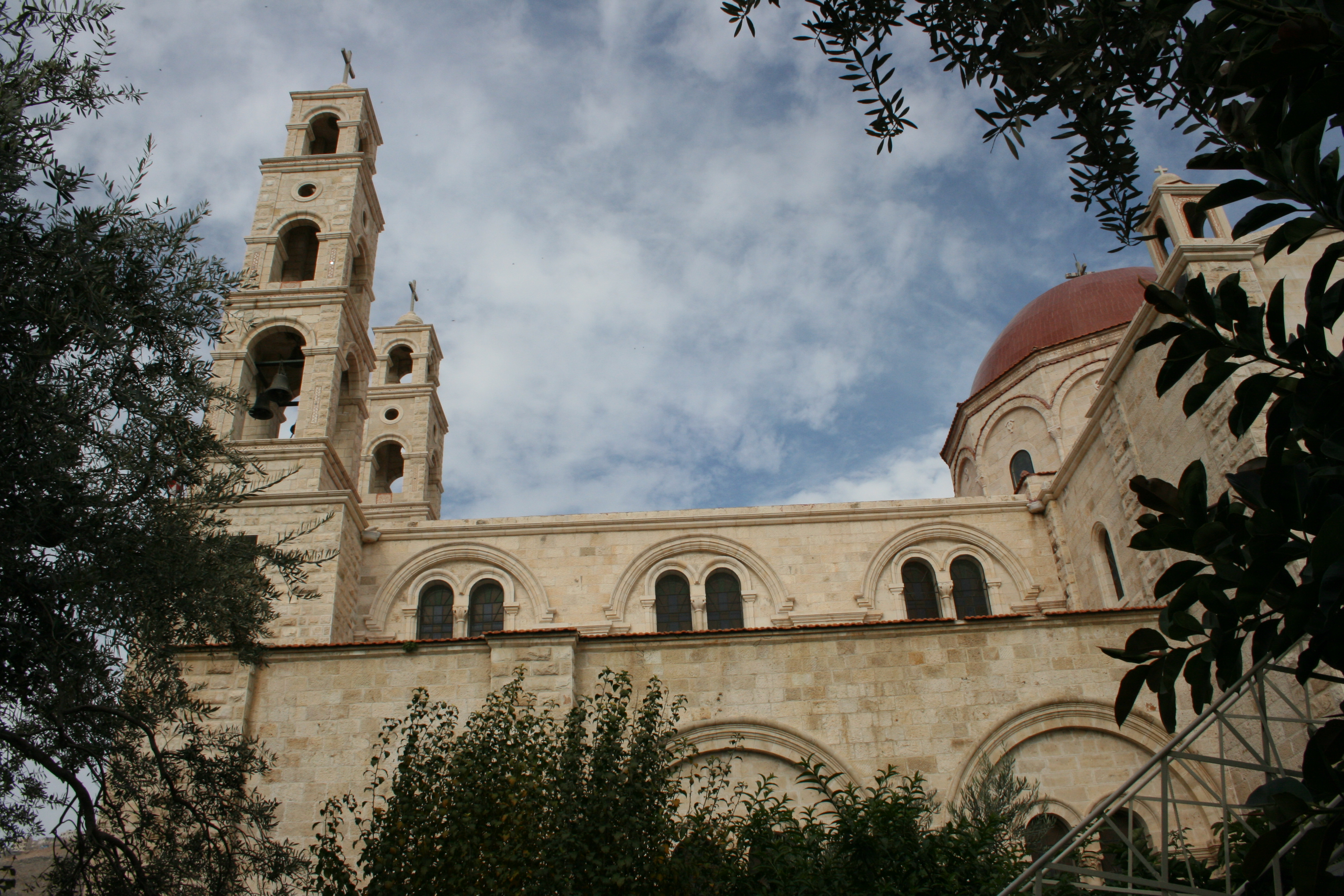
Greek Orthodox Church of St. Photini the Samaritan Woman, built over the site of Jacob's Well, where St. Philoumenos was martyred in 1979.

== Sources ==
- November 16 / December 29. Orthodox Calendar (PRAVOSLAVIE.RU).
- November 29 / November 16. Holy Trinity Russian Orthodox Church (A parish of the Patriarchate of Moscow).
- November 16. OCA - The Lives of the Saints.
- The Autonomous Orthodox Metropolia of Western Europe and the Americas (ROCOR). St. Hilarion Calendar of Saints for the year of our Lord 2004. St. Hilarion Press (Austin, TX). p. 86.
- The Sixteenth Day of the Month of November. Orthodoxy in China.
- November 16. Latin Saints of the Orthodox Patriarchate of Rome.
- The Roman Martyrology. Transl. by the Archbishop of Baltimore. Last Edition, According to the Copy Printed at Rome in 1914. Revised Edition, with the Imprimatur of His Eminence Cardinal Gibbons. Baltimore: John Murphy Company, 1916. pp. 353–354.
- Rev. Richard Stanton. A Menology of England and Wales, or, Brief Memorials of the Ancient British and English Saints Arranged According to the Calendar, Together with the Martyrs of the 16th and 17th Centuries. London: Burns & Oates, 1892. pp. 544–550.

Greek Sources

- Great Synaxaristes: (in Greek) 16 ΝΟΕΜΒΡΙΟΥ. ΜΕΓΑΣ ΣΥΝΑΞΑΡΙΣΤΗΣ.
- (in Greek) Συναξαριστής. 16 Νοεμβρίου. ECCLESIA.GR. (H ΕΚΚΛΗΣΙΑ ΤΗΣ ΕΛΛΑΔΟΣ).
- (in Greek) November 16. Ορθόδοξος Συναξαριστής.

Russian Sources

- (in Russian) 29 ноября (16 ноября). Православная Энциклопедия под редакцией Патриарха Московского и всея Руси Кирилла (электронная версия). (Orthodox Encyclopedia - Pravenc.ru).
- (in Russian) 16 ноября по старому стилю / 29 ноября по новому стилю. Русская Православная Церковь - Православный церковный календарь на 2018 год.
