= November 15 (Eastern Orthodox liturgics) =

Day in the Eastern Orthodox liturgical calendar

Eastern Orthodox liturgical calendar
November 14	November 15	November 16
November 15 O.S. ≍ November 28 N.S. November 15 N.S ≍ November 2 O.S.

An Eastern Orthodox cross

November 15 in Eastern Orthodox liturgical calendars is a feast day and a day of commemoration of saints and martyrs. Although some Orthodox churches use the Revised Julian Calendar and others use the traditional Julian calendar, the fixed commemorations for their respective November 15 are broadly the same, no matter which calendar is used. (Note: Despite the dates being the same, the days to which they refer typically differ by 13 days. The notation Old Style or O.S. is sometimes used to indicate a date in the traditional Julian Calendar (the "Old Calendar"). The notation New Style or N.S. indicates a date in the Revised Julian calendar (the "New Calendar").)

== Saints ==
- Martyr Demetrius of Thrace, from the village Davoudio (Dabuda), close to town Amapasos (Amapas), by beheading (298) (Note: Saint Demetrius was tortured for the sake of Christ by Pomplius the governor in the village of Daodus, and then he was beheaded.)
- Holy Martyrs and Confessors Gurias (299), Samonas (306), and Habibus (Abibus) (322), of Edessa.
- Saint Quinctian (Kyntion), Bishop of Seleucia (4th century) (Note: He was one of the 318 Fathers of the First Ecumenical Council of Nicaea, in Bithynia. He became an ascetic and also a wonderworker. He reposed peacefully.)
- Martyrs Eupsychios, Nearchos and Karterios. (Note: The memory of these three martyrs is preserved in Parisian Codex 1578 and in Patmian Codex 266, along with their companions.) (see also: November 5)
- Martyrs Elpidius, Marcellus, and Eustochius, who suffered under Julian the Apostate (361) (see also: November 16 - West)
- Saint Thomas II the New, Ecumenical Patriarch of Constantinople (668–669) (see also: November 14 and November 16)

== Pre-Schism Western saints ==
- Saint Eugene, preached the Gospel with St Denis, Bishop of Paris in France, and was martyred. (Note: "The same day, the birthday of St. Eugenius, bishop of Toledo, and martyr, disciple of blessed Denis the Areopagite. Having consummated his martyrdom near Paris, he received from our Lord a crown for his blessed sufferings. His body was afterwards conveyed to Toledo.")
- Saint Felix of Nola, first Bishop of Nola near Naples in Italy, martyred with thirty companions (287) (Note: "At Nola, in Campania, blessed Felix, bishop and martyr, who was renowned for miracles from the fifteenth year of his age. He terminated the combats of his martyrdom with thirty others, under the governor Marcian.") (see also: January 14)
- Twenty Martyrs (Fidentian, Valerian, Victoria, etc.) in North Africa.
- Saint Luperius, Bishop of Verona and Confessor (6th or 8th century)
- Saint Malo (Maclovius, Machutis, Maclou, Machulus), first Bishop of Aleth (c. 640) (Note: Born in Wales, he moved to Brittany and settled at a place called Aleth, now St Malo, where he was the first bishop.) (Note: "In Bretagne, the birthday of St. Malo, bishop, who was glorious for miracles from his early years.") (see also: November 14)
- Saint Desiderius (Didier), who succeeded his own brother, St Rusticus, as Bishop of Cahors in France (655)
- Saint Machudd (Machell), founder of the monastery of Llanfechell in Anglesey in Wales (7th century)
- Saint Paduinus (Pavin), a monk at the monastery of St Vincent in Le Mans in France, then first Abbot of St Mary's near Le Mans (c. 703)
- Saint Arnulf, Bishop of Toul in France (871)
- Saint Findan (Fintan), hermit (879) (Note: Born in Leinster in Ireland, he was taken as a slave to the Orkney Islands by Norse raiders, but managed to escape to Scotland. He then went on pilgrimage to Rome and became a monk in Farfa Abbey in Italy. From there he went to the monastery of Rheinau Abbey in Switzerland, where he lived as a hermit for twenty-two years. His relics still exist.)

== Post-Schism Orthodox saints ==
- Venerable Philip, Abbot of Rabang, Vologda (1457) (Note: See: (in Russian) Филипп Рабангский. Википедии. (Russian Wikipedia).)
- Venerable Paisius Velichkovsky of Moldavia and Mt. Athos (1794) (Note: St. Paisius was one of the greatest teachers of the spirituality of the Jesus Prayer and translator of Patristic texts on prayer, St Paisius renewed monastic life in several Orthodox lands and had disciples from ten nationalities. His disciples prayed up to 14 hours per day as they united prayer with reading and physical work.)

=== New martyrs and confessors ===
- New Hieromartyrs Nicholas and Peter Kondarov, priests, Gregory Dolinin (Note: See: (in Russian) ГРИГОРИЙ. Православная Энциклопедия под редакцией Патриарха Московского и всея Руси Кирилла (электронная версия). (Orthodox Encyclopedia - Pravenc.ru).) and Nicetas Almazov, deacons (1937)

== Other commemorations ==
- Beginning of the Nativity Fast.
- Commemoration of the pious Emperor Justin and Theodora. (Note: There is some confusion in the sources as to whether this refers to 'Justinian and Theodora' or to 'Justin and Euphemia'.)
- "Kupyatich" Icon (1180) of the Most Holy Theotokos.
- "Fragrant Flower" Icon of the Mother of God
- Repose of St. Herman of Alaska, Wonderworker of Alaska (1836) (Commemorates actual day of his repose; see also: December 13 - feast day; and August 9 - glorification)
- Catherine Routtis of Mandra, Attica, Greece (1927) (Old Calendarist only)

== Icon gallery ==
Martyr Demetrius of Thrace.
(Menologion of Basil II, 10th century).

Holy Martyrs and Confessors Gurias (299), Samonas (306), and Habibus (Abibus) (322), of Edessa.
(Menologion of Basil II, 10th century).

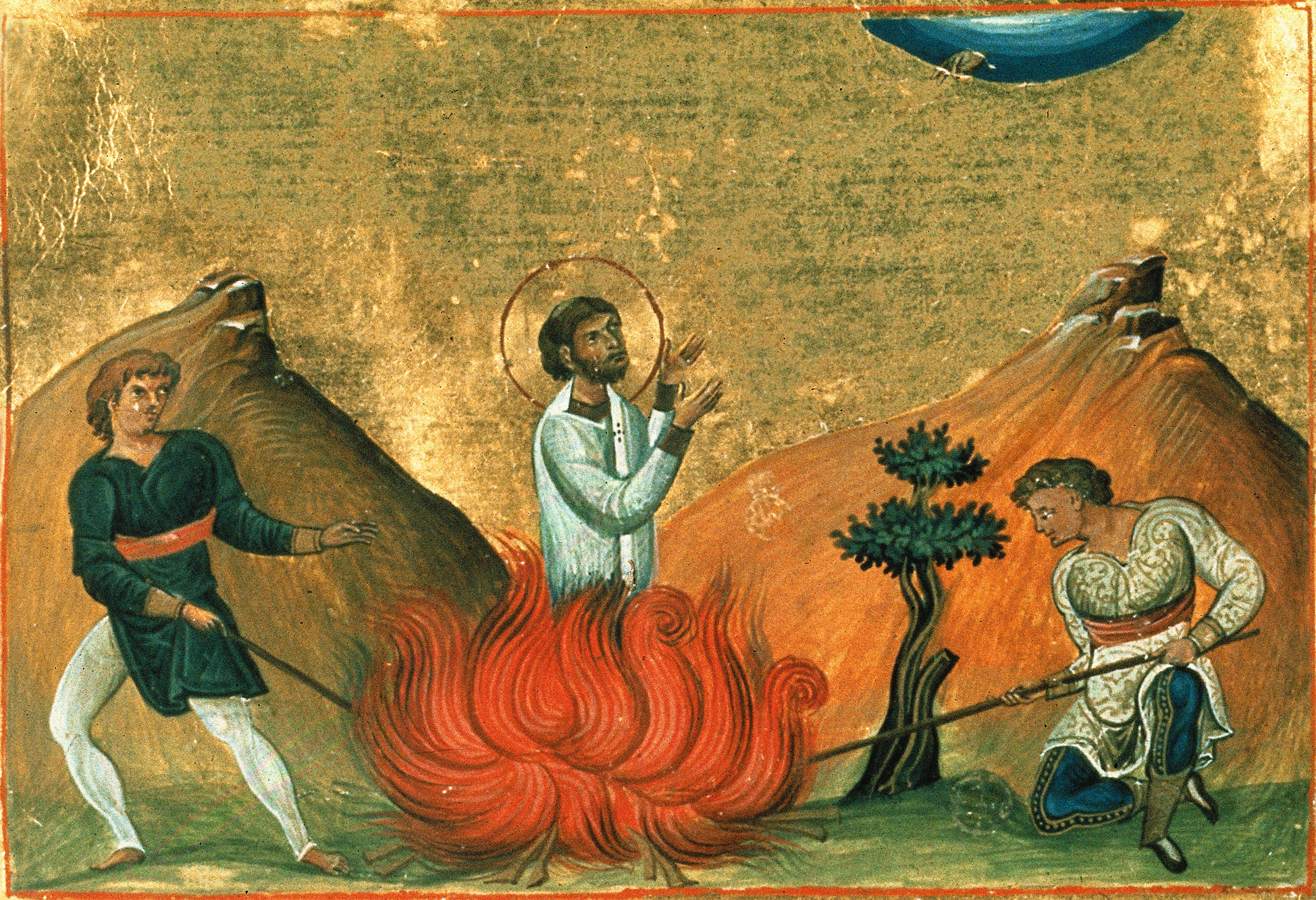
Martyr Abibus of Edessa.
(Menologion of Basil II, 10th century).

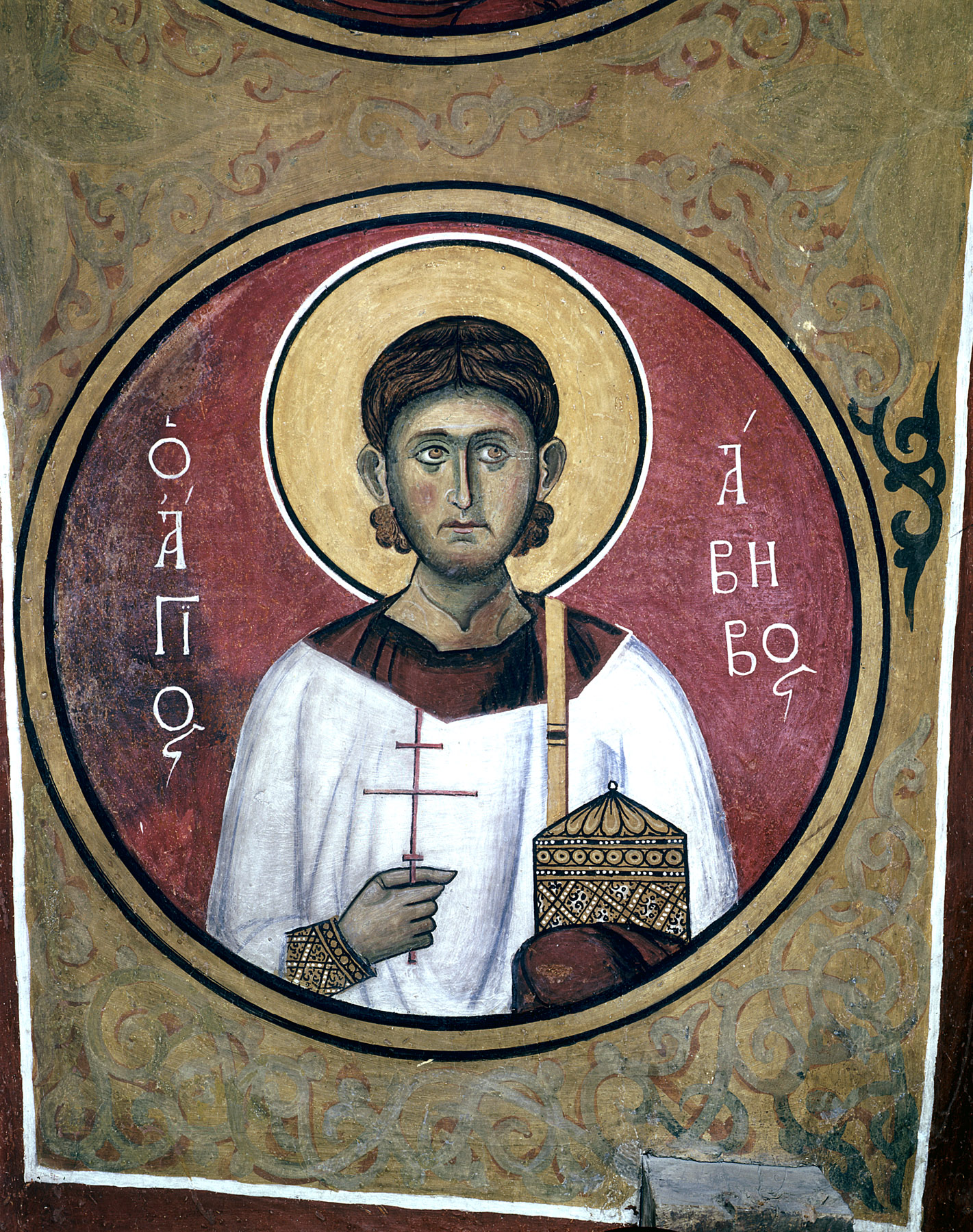
Martyr Abibus of Edessa.
(Church of Panagia tou Arakos, Lagoudera, Cyprus).

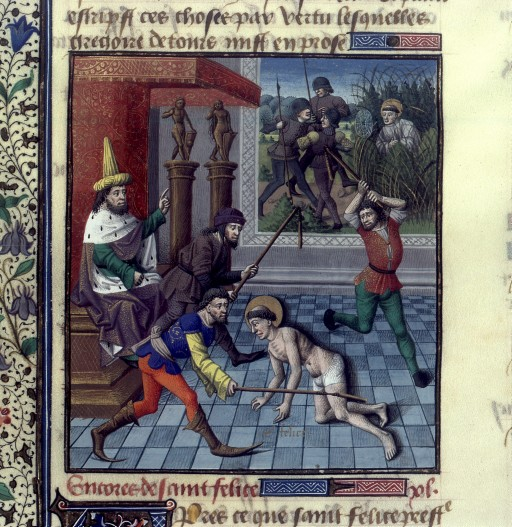
St. Felix of Nola, under Torture and on the Run.

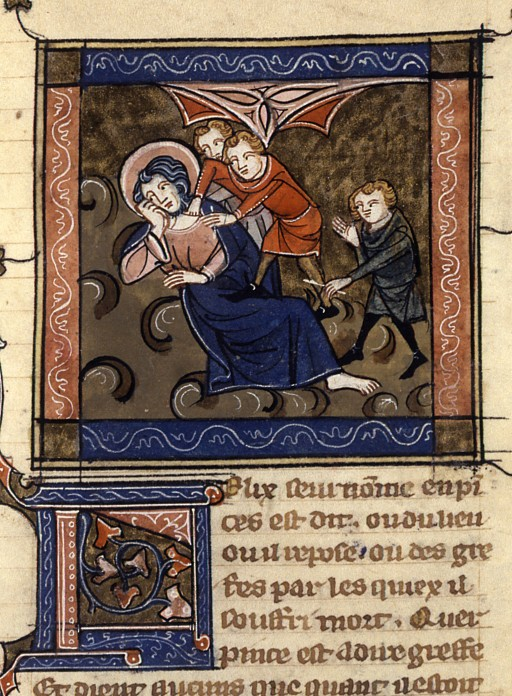
St. Felix of Nola, stabbed to death by his pupils.

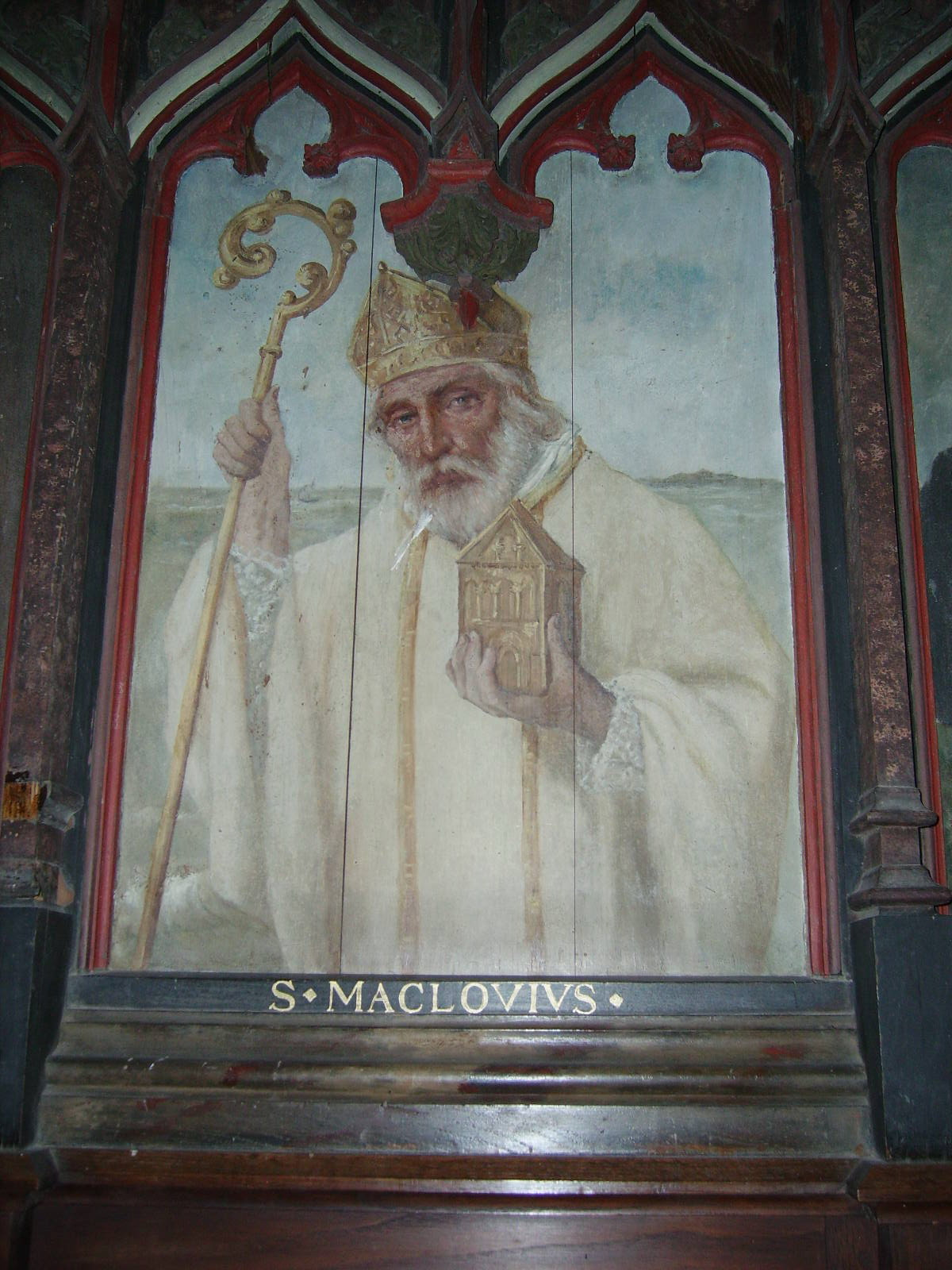
St. Malo (Maclovius), first Bishop of Aleth.

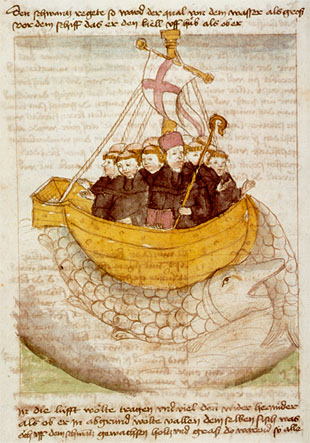
St. Malo is said to have accompanied Saint Brendan on the latter's famous voyage.

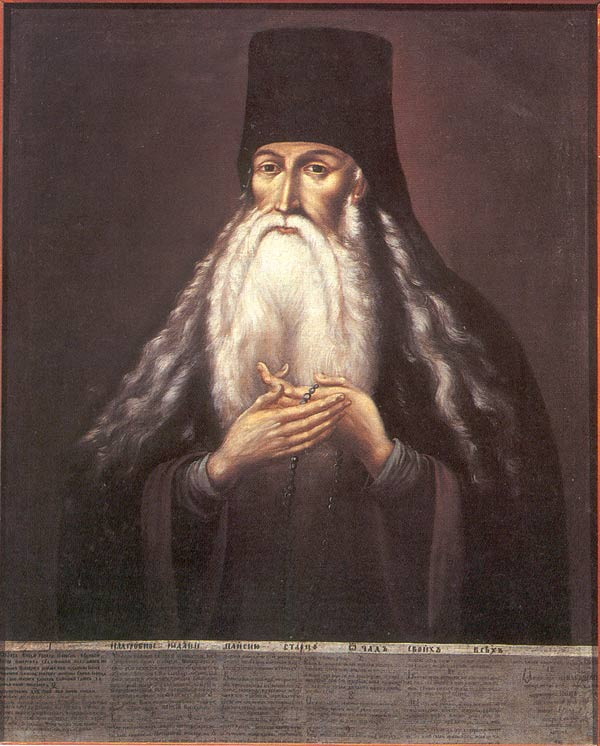
Venerable Paisius Velichkovsky.

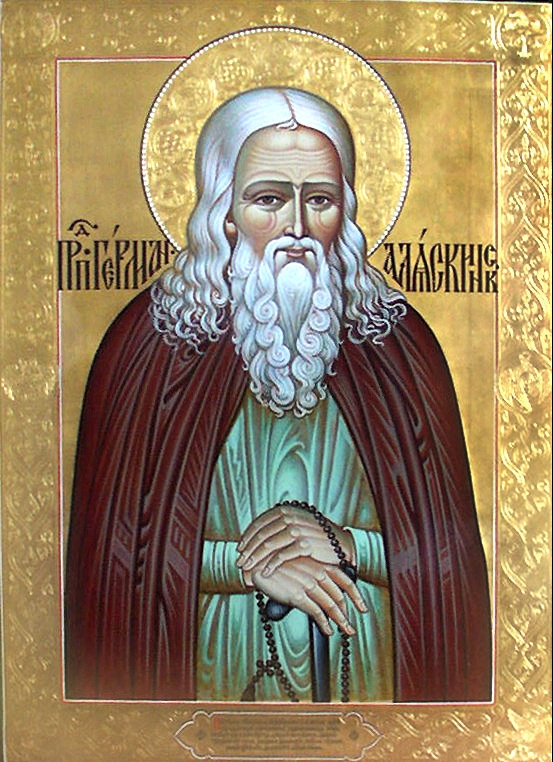
St. Herman of Alaska.

== Sources ==
- November 15 / December 28. Orthodox Calendar (PRAVOSLAVIE.RU).
- November 28 / November 15. Holy Trinity Russian Orthodox Church (A parish of the Patriarchate of Moscow).
- November 15. OCA - The Lives of the Saints.
- The Autonomous Orthodox Metropolia of Western Europe and the Americas (ROCOR). St. Hilarion Calendar of Saints for the year of our Lord 2004. St. Hilarion Press (Austin, TX). p. 85.
- The Fifteenth Day of the Month of November. Orthodoxy in China.
- November 15. Latin Saints of the Orthodox Patriarchate of Rome.
- The Roman Martyrology. Transl. by the Archbishop of Baltimore. Last Edition, According to the Copy Printed at Rome in 1914. Revised Edition, with the Imprimatur of His Eminence Cardinal Gibbons. Baltimore: John Murphy Company, 1916. pp. 352–353.
- Rev. Richard Stanton. A Menology of England and Wales, or, Brief Memorials of the Ancient British and English Saints Arranged According to the Calendar, Together with the Martyrs of the 16th and 17th Centuries. London: Burns & Oates, 1892. pp. 542–544.

Greek Sources

- Great Synaxaristes: (in Greek) 15 ΝΟΕΜΒΡΙΟΥ. ΜΕΓΑΣ ΣΥΝΑΞΑΡΙΣΤΗΣ.
- (in Greek) Συναξαριστής. 15 Νοεμβρίου. ECCLESIA.GR. (H ΕΚΚΛΗΣΙΑ ΤΗΣ ΕΛΛΑΔΟΣ).
- (in Greek) November 15. Ορθόδοξος Συναξαριστής.

Russian Sources

- (in Russian) 28 ноября (15 ноября). Православная Энциклопедия под редакцией Патриарха Московского и всея Руси Кирилла (электронная версия). (Orthodox Encyclopedia - Pravenc.ru).
