= Koçhisar, Sandıklı =

Koçhisar
- Village
- Location within Turkey Location within Turkey Aegean
- Country: Turkey
- Province: Afyonkarahisar
- District: Sandıklı
- Population (2021): 527
- Time zone: UTC+3 (TRT)

Koçhisar is a village in the Sandıklı District, Afyonkarahisar Province, Turkey. Its population is 527 (2021).

== History ==
Ancient Hierapolis (Ancient Greek: Ἱεράπολις) was part of the Phrygian Pentapolis and remained under that name during the Byzantine period.
