= November 2 =

November 2 this year in various calendars
- Monday, 2 November 2026
Akan	Nwonadwo
Armenian	15 Trē 1476
Aztec	Atlcahualo 11, 11 Cuetzpalin
Babylonian	20 Tashritu, 2337 SE
Balinese pawukon	Luang, Pepet, Beteng, Laba, Pon, Aryang, Coma of Sinta, Indra, Dangu, Pati
Bengali	17 Kartik, BS 1433
Chinese	Yang Metal Dragon・Net Mansion; Fire Horse Year, Month 9, Day 24 (Shuangjiang, 5 days until Lidong)
Common Era	2 November 2026 CE
Coptic	23 Paopi, AM 1743
Egyptian	20 Phamenoth, 2775 NE
Ethiopian	23 Ṭeqemt, 2019 Amätä Məhrät
French Republican	Décade II, Primidi de Brumaire de l'Année 235 de la République
Gregorian	2 November, AD 2026
Hebrew	22 Cheshvan, AM 5787
Hindu	Puṣya・Śubha; Solar: 16 Kārtika, 1948 SE; Lunisolar: Aṣṭamī, Kṛishna pakṣa of Āśvina, 2083 VE; Rāudra・5127 KY・1,872,881
Icelandic	Mánudagur, 10 Gormánuður 2026
Islamic	21 Jumada al-awwal, AH 1448 (using tabular method)
ISO week date	2026-W45-1
Japanese	23 Nagatsuki, Reiwa 8 (Sōkō, 5 days until Rittō)
Julian	20 October, AD 2026 (AM 7535)
Julian day	2461347
Korean	23 Gaedal, 4359 DE
Maya	13.0.14.1.4; 17 Zac, 11 Kan
Roman	ante diem XIII Kalendas Novembres, MMDCCLXXIX AUC
Solar Hijri	11 Aban, SH 1405
Tibetan	23 tha skar, me pho rta 2153 or 1772 or 1000

<<	November					>>
Su	Mo	Tu	We	Th	Fr	Sa
1	2	3	4	5	6	7
8	9	10	11	12	13	14
15	16	17	18	19	20	21
22	23	24	25	26	27	28
29	30
2026

November 2 in recent years
2026 (Monday)
2025 (Sunday)
2024 (Saturday)
2023 (Thursday)
2022 (Wednesday)
2021 (Tuesday)
2020 (Monday)
2019 (Saturday)
2018 (Friday)
2017 (Thursday)

November 2 is the 306th day of the year (307th in leap years) in the Gregorian calendar; 59 days remain until the end of the year.

== Events ==
=== Pre-1600 ===
- 619 – A qaghan of the Western Turkic Khaganate is assassinated in a Chinese palace by Eastern Turkic rivals after the approval of Tang emperor Gaozu.
- 676 – Election of pope Donus following the death of pope Adeodatus II some months prior.
- 1410 – The Peace of Bicêtre suspends hostilities in the Armagnac–Burgundian Civil War.

=== 1601–1900 ===
- 1622 – The Imperial-Spanish army under the Count of Tilly captures Mannheim.
- 1675 – Plymouth Colony governor Josiah Winslow leads a colonial militia against the Narragansett during King Philip's War.
- 1707 – Four British naval vessels run aground on the Isles of Scilly because of faulty navigation. In response, the first Longitude Act is enacted in 1714.
- 1795 – The French Directory, a five-man revolutionary government, is created.
- 1868 – Dost Mohammad Khan surrenders to the British and is exiled, but the First Anglo-Afghan War continues.
- 1868 – Time zone: New Zealand officially adopts a standard time to be observed nationally.
- 1882 – The great fire destroys a large part of Oulu's city center in Oulu Province, Finland.
- 1889 – North Dakota and South Dakota are admitted as the 39th and 40th U.S. states.
- 1899 – The Boers begin their 118-day siege of British-held Ladysmith during the Second Boer War.

=== 1901–present ===
- 1912 – Bulgaria defeats the Ottoman Empire in the Battle of Lule Burgas, the bloodiest battle of the First Balkan War, which opens her way to Constantinople.
- 1914 – World War I: The Russian Empire declares war on the Ottoman Empire and the Dardanelles is subsequently closed.
- 1916 – Hussein bin Ali proclaims himself "King of the Arab Countries".
- 1917 – The Balfour Declaration proclaims British support for the "establishment in Palestine of a national home for the Jewish people" with the clear understanding "that nothing shall be done which may prejudice the civil and religious rights of existing non-Jewish communities".
- 1917 – The Military Revolutionary Committee of the Petrograd Soviet, in charge of preparation and carrying out the Russian Revolution, holds its first meeting.
- 1920 – The Ocoee massacre commences in Orange County, Florida on the day of the 1920 United States presidential election.
- 1920 – In the United States, KDKA of Pittsburgh starts broadcasting as the first commercial radio station. The first broadcast is the result of the 1920 United States presidential election.
- 1936 – The BBC Television Service, the world's first regular, "high-definition" (then defined as at least 200 lines) service begins. Renamed BBC1 in 1964, the channel still runs to this day.
- 1940 – World War II: First day of Battle of Elaia–Kalamas between the Greeks and the Italians.
- 1947 – In California, designer Howard Hughes performs the maiden (and only) flight of the Hughes H-4 Hercules (also known as the "Spruce Goose"), the largest fixed-wing aircraft ever built until Scaled Composites rolled out their Stratolaunch in May 2017.
- 1949 – The Dutch–Indonesian Round Table Conference ends with the Netherlands agreeing to transfer sovereignty of the Dutch East Indies to the United States of Indonesia.
- 1951 – Canada in the Korean War: A platoon of The Royal Canadian Regiment defends a vital area against a full battalion of Chinese troops in the Battle of the Song-gok Spur. The engagement lasts into the early hours the next day.
- 1956 – Hungarian Revolution: Nikita Khrushchev meets with leaders of other Communist countries to seek their advice on the situation in Hungary, selecting János Kádár as the country's next leader on the advice of Josip Broz Tito.
- 1956 – Suez Crisis: Israel occupies the Gaza Strip.
- 1959 – Quiz show scandals: Twenty-One game show contestant Charles Van Doren admits to a Congressional committee that he had been given questions and answers in advance.
- 1959 – The first section of the M1 motorway, the first inter-urban motorway in the United Kingdom, is opened between the present junctions 5 and 18, along with the M10 motorway and M45 motorway.
- 1960 – Penguin Books is found not guilty of obscenity in the trial R v Penguin Books Ltd, the Lady Chatterley's Lover case.
- 1963 – South Vietnamese President Ngô Đình Diệm is assassinated following a military coup.
- 1964 – King Saud of Saudi Arabia is deposed by a family coup, and replaced by his half-brother Faisal.
- 1965 – Norman Morrison, a 31-year-old Quaker, sets himself on fire in front of the river entrance to the Pentagon to protest the use of napalm in the Vietnam war.
- 1966 – The Cuban Adjustment Act comes into force, allowing 123,000 Cubans the opportunity to apply for permanent residence in the United States.
- 1967 – Vietnam War: US President Lyndon B. Johnson and "The Wise Men" conclude that the American people should be given more optimistic reports on the progress of the war.
- 1973 – Aeroflot Flight 19 is hijacked and diverted to Vnukovo International Airport, where the aircraft is stormed by authorities.
- 1982 – Channel 4, the British free-to-air public broadcast television channel funded by its commercial activities, starts broadcasting.
- 1983 – U.S. President Ronald Reagan signs a bill creating Martin Luther King Jr. Day.
- 1984 – Capital punishment: Velma Barfield becomes the first woman executed in the United States since 1962.
- 1986 – Lebanon hostage crisis: U.S. hostage David Jacobsen is released in Beirut after 17 months in captivity.
- 1988 – The Morris worm, the first Internet-distributed computer worm to gain significant mainstream media attention, is launched from MIT.
- 1988 – LOT Polish Airlines Flight 703 crashes in Białobrzegi, Podkarpackie Voivodeship, Poland, killing one person and injuring several more.
- 1990 – British Satellite Broadcasting and Sky Television plc merge to form BSkyB as a result of massive losses.
- 1997 – Tropical Storm Linda makes landfall in the Mekong Delta in Vietnam, causing more than 3,000 deaths.
- 1999 – Honolulu shootings: In the worst mass murder in the history of Hawaii, a gunman shoots at eight people in his workplace, killing seven.
- 2000 – Expedition 1 arrived at the International Space Station for the first long-duration stay onboard. From this day to present, a continuous human presence in space on the station remains uninterrupted.
- 2008 – Lewis Hamilton secured his maiden Formula One Drivers' Championship Title by one point ahead of Felipe Massa at the Brazilian Grand Prix, after a pass for fifth place against the Toyota of Timo Glock on the final lap of the race.
- 2016 – The Chicago Cubs defeat the Cleveland Indians in the World Series, ending the longest Major League Baseball championship drought at 108 years.
- 2020 – In Vienna's Innere Stadt district, an ISIL sympathizer shoots and kills four people and injures 23 more, before being shot and killed by the police.
- 2022 – A peace agreement is signed between the Ethiopian government and the Tigray People's Liberation Front, ending the Tigray War.

== Births ==
=== Pre-1600 ===
- 971 – Mahmud of Ghazni (died 1030)
- 1418 – Gaspare Nadi, Italian builder and writer (died 1504)
- 1428 – Yolande, Duchess of Lorraine (died 1483)
- 1470 – Edward V, King of England (died 1483)
- 1475 – Anne of York, seventh child of King Edward IV of England and Elizabeth Woodville (died 1511)
- 1549 – Anna of Austria, Queen of Spain (died 1580)

=== 1601–1900 ===
- 1636 – Edward Colston, English merchant and politician (died 1721)
- 1649 – Esmé Stewart, 2nd Duke of Richmond (died 1660)
- 1696 – Conrad Weiser, American soldier, monk, and judge (died 1760)
- 1699 – Jean-Baptiste-Siméon Chardin, French painter and educator (died 1779)
- 1709 – Anne, Princess Royal and Princess of Orange (died 1759)
- 1734 – Daniel Boone, American hunter and explorer (died 1820)
- 1755 – Marie Antoinette, Austrian-French queen consort of Louis XVI of France (died 1793)
- 1777 – Fortunat Alojzy Gonzaga Żółkowski, Polish actor and translator (died 1822)
- 1795 – James K. Polk, American lawyer and politician, 11th President of the United States (died 1849)
- 1799 – John Light Atlee, American physician and surgeon (died 1885)
- 1808 – Jules Amédée Barbey d'Aurevilly, French author and critic (died 1889)
- 1815 – George Boole, English mathematician and philosopher (died 1864)
- 1821 – George Bowen, Irish-English diplomat, 5th Governor-General of New Zealand (died 1899)
- 1837 – Émile Bayard, French illustrator and painter (died 1891)
- 1844 – Mehmed V, Ottoman sultan (died 1918)
- 1844 – John J. Loud, American inventor (died 1916)
- 1847 – Georges Sorel, French philosopher and author (died 1922)
- 1855 – Henrik Schück, Swedish historian, author, and academic (died 1947)
- 1865 – Warren G. Harding, American journalist and politician, 29th President of the United States (died 1923)
- 1877 – Joseph De Piro, Maltese priest and missionary (died 1933)
- 1877 – Aga Khan III, Indian 48th Shia Imam (died 1957)
- 1877 – Victor Trumper, Australian cricketer (died 1915)
- 1878 – Ōkido Moriemon, Japanese sumo wrestler, the 23rd Yokozuna (died 1930)
- 1879 – Marion Jones Farquhar, American tennis player and violinist (died 1965)
- 1883 – Jean-Marie-Rodrigue Villeneuve, Canadian cardinal (died 1947)
- 1885 – Harlow Shapley, American astronomer and academic (died 1972)
- 1886 – Dhirendranath Datta, Pakistani lawyer and politician (died 1971)
- 1890 – Nishinoumi Kajirō III, Japanese sumo wrestler, the 30th Yokozuna (died 1933)
- 1890 – Moa Martinson, Swedish author (died 1964)
- 1892 – Alice Brady, American actress (died 1939)
- 1893 – Battista Farina, Italian businessman, founded the Pininfarina Company (died 1966)
- 1894 – Alexander Lippisch, German-American aerodynamicist and engineer (died 1976)
- 1897 – Jacob Bjerknes, Norwegian-American meteorologist (died 1975)

=== 1901–present ===
- 1901 – James Dunn, American actor (died 1967)
- 1903 – Travis Jackson, American baseball player, coach, and manager (died 1987)
- 1905 – Isobel Andrews, New Zealand writer (died 1990)
- 1905 – Georges Schehadé, Lebanese poet and playwright (died 1989)
- 1906 – Daniil Andreyev, Russian poet and mystic (died 1959)
- 1906 – Luchino Visconti, Italian director and screenwriter (died 1976)
- 1908 – Fred Bakewell, English cricketer (died 1983)
- 1908 – Bunny Berigan, American trumpet player (died 1942)
- 1910 – Fouad Serageddin, Egyptian lawyer and politician, Egyptian Minister of Interior (died 1999)
- 1911 – Odysseas Elytis, Greek poet and critic, Nobel Prize laureate (died 1996)
- 1911 – Raphael M. Robinson, American mathematician, philosopher, and theorist (died 1995)
- 1913 – Burt Lancaster, American actor (died 1994)
- 1914 – Johnny Vander Meer, American baseball player and manager (died 1997)
- 1914 – Ray Walston, American actor (died 2001)
- 1915 – Sidney Luft, American film producer (died 2005)
- 1917 – Ann Rutherford, American actress (died 2012)
- 1918 – Alexander Vraciu, American commander and pilot of Romanian descent (died 2015)
- 1919 – Warren Stevens, American actor (died 2012)
- 1920 – Bill Mazer, Ukrainian-American journalist and sportscaster (died 2013)
- 1921 – Shepard Menken, American actor (died 1999)
- 1921 – Bill Mosienko, Canadian ice hockey player and coach (died 1994)
- 1922 – Michael Loewe, British historian, Sinologist and writer (died 2025)
- 1923 – Tibor Rosenbaum, Hungarian-born Swiss rabbi and businessman (died 1980)
- 1924 – David Bauer, Canadian ice hockey player and coach (died 1988)
- 1924 – Rudy Van Gelder, American record producer and engineer (died 2016)
- 1926 – Myer Skoog, American basketball player (died 2019)
- 1926 – Charlie Walker, American country music singer-songwriter, guitarist, and DJ (died 2008)
- 1927 – Steve Ditko, American author and illustrator (died 2018)
- 1927 – John Sainsbury, Baron Sainsbury of Preston Candover, English businessman and politician (died 2022)
- 1928 – Gerry Alexander, Jamaican cricketer and veterinarian (died 2011)
- 1928 – Paul Johnson, English journalist, historian, and author (died 2023)
- 1928 – James Luisi, American basketball player and actor (died 2002)
- 1928 – Shulamith Shahar, Latvian-born Israeli historian (died 2025)
- 1929 – Amar Bose, American engineer and businessman, founded the Bose Corporation (died 2013)
- 1929 – Robert Gover, American journalist and author (died 2015)
- 1929 – Muhammad Rafiq Tarar, Pakistani judge and politician, 9th President of Pakistan (died 2022)
- 1929 – Richard E. Taylor, Canadian physicist and academic, Nobel Prize laureate (died 2018)
- 1931 – Phil Woods, American saxophonist, composer, and bandleader (died 2015)
- 1933 – Clarence D. Rappleyea Jr., American lawyer and politician (died 2016)
- 1934 – Joseph E. Brennan, American politician, 70th Governor of Maine (died 2024)
- 1934 – Ken Rosewall, Australian tennis player
- 1935 – Shirshendu Mukhopadhyay, Indian author
- 1936 – Rose Bird, American lawyer and judge, 25th Chief Justice of California (died 1999)
- 1937 – Earl Carroll, American singer (died 2012)
- 1938 – Pat Buchanan, American journalist and politician
- 1938 – David Eden Lane, American white supremacist (died 2007)
- 1938 – Queen Sofía of Spain, Queen Consort of King Juan Carlos of Spain
- 1938 – Josse Goffin, Belgian artist and graphic novelist (died 2024)
- 1939 – Pauline Neville-Jones, Baroness Neville-Jones, English broadcaster and politician, Minister for Security
- 1939 – Richard Serra, American sculptor and academic (died 2024)
- 1940 – Jim Bakken, American football player
- 1940 – Phil Minton, English singer and trumpet player
- 1941 – Arun Shourie, Indian journalist, economist, and politician, Indian Minister of Communications
- 1941 – Dave Stockton, American golfer
- 1941 – Bruce Welch, English singer-songwriter, guitarist, and producer
- 1942 – Shere Hite, German sexologist, author, and educator (died 2020)
- 1942 – Stefanie Powers, American actress
- 1943 – Oldřich Pelčák, Czech cosmonaut and engineer (died 2023)
- 1944 – Patrice Chéreau, French actor, director, producer, and screenwriter (died 2013)
- 1944 – Keith Emerson, English pianist, keyboard player, and composer (died 2016)
- 1945 – Giorgos Kolokithas, Greek basketball player (died 2013)
- 1945 – Larry Little, American football player
- 1945 – JD Souther, American singer-songwriter, guitarist, and actor (died 2024)
- 1946 – Alan Jones, Australian race car driver and sportscaster (died 2026)
- 1946 – Giuseppe Sinopoli, Italian conductor and composer (died 2001)
- 1947 – Dave Pegg, English bass player and producer
- 1947 – Kate Linder, American actress
- 1949 – Lois McMaster Bujold, American author
- 1949 – Grace Y. Sam, Palauan politician
- 1951 – Thomas Mallon, American novelist, essayist, and critic
- 1951 – Lindy Morrison, Australian rock drummer
- 1952 – Ron Lee, American basketball player
- 1952 – Maxine Nightingale, English R&B/soul singer
- 1955 – Thomas Grunenberg, German footballer and manager
- 1956 – Dale Brown, American author and pilot
- 1957 – Carter Beauford, American drummer and composer
- 1958 – Willie McGee, American baseball player and manager
- 1959 – Peter Mullan, Scottish actor, director, and screenwriter
- 1960 – Rosalyn Fairbank, South African tennis player
- 1961 – k.d. lang, Canadian singer-songwriter, producer, and actress
- 1961 – Jeff Tedford, American football player and coach
- 1962 – Mireille Delunsch, French operatic soprano
- 1962 – Derek Mountfield, English footballer and manager
- 1963 – Bobby Dall, American bass player
- 1963 – Brian Kemp, American politician, 83rd Governor of Georgia
- 1963 – Borut Pahor, Slovenian lawyer and politician, 4th President of Slovenia
- 1964 – Alan Tait, English-Scottish rugby player and coach
- 1964 – Lauren Vélez, American actress
- 1965 – Nick Boles, English businessman and politician
- 1965 – Shah Rukh Khan, Indian film actor, producer and television host
- 1966 – David Schwimmer, American actor
- 1967 – Kurt Elling, American singer-songwriter
- 1967 – Scott Walker, American politician, 45th Governor of Wisconsin
- 1968 – Neal Casal, American singer-songwriter, guitarist, and photographer (died 2019)
- 1968 – Keith Jennings, American basketball player and coach
- 1969 – Reginald Arvizu, American rock musician
- 1971 – Meta Golding, Haitian-American actress
- 1972 – Marion Posch, Italian snowboarder
- 1972 – Darío Silva, Uruguayan footballer and coach
- 1972 – Vladimir Vorobiev, Russian ice hockey player and coach
- 1972 – Samantha Womack, British actress, singer and director
- 1973 – Ben Graham, Australian footballer
- 1973 – Marisol Nichols, American actress
- 1974 – Orlando Cabrera, Colombian-American baseball player
- 1974 – Nelly, American rapper
- 1974 – Prodigy, American rapper (died 2017)
- 1974 – Ruslan Salei, Belarusian ice hockey player (died 2011)
- 1975 – Danny Cooksey, American actor and musician
- 1975 – Stéphane Sarrazin, French race car driver
- 1975 – Chris Walla, American singer-songwriter, guitarist, and producer
- 1976 – Matt Cullen, American ice hockey player
- 1976 – Thierry Omeyer, French handball goalkeeper
- 1976 – Sidney Ponson, Aruban baseball player
- 1977 – Rodney Buford, American basketball player
- 1977 – Konstantinos Economidis, Greek tennis player
- 1977 – Reshma Shetty, British-American actress
- 1977 – Leon Taylor, English diver and sportscaster
- 1978 – Carmen Cali, American baseball player
- 1979 – Simone Puleo, Italian footballer
- 1979 – Anna Sobolak, Polish politician and businessperson
- 1980 – Diego Lugano, Uruguayan footballer
- 1980 – Amos Roberts, Australian rugby player
- 1981 – Monica Iozzi, Brazilian actress
- 1981 – Katharine Isabelle, Canadian actress
- 1981 – Mitchell Johnson, Australian cricketer
- 1981 – Rafael Márquez Lugo, Mexican footballer
- 1981 – Miryo, South Korean rapper
- 1981 – Roddy White, American football player
- 1981 – Esha Deol, Indian actress
- 1982 – Yunel Escobar, Cuban-American baseball player
- 1982 – Charles Itandje, French-Cameroonian footballer
- 1983 – Ebonette Deigaeruk, Nauruan weightlifter
- 1983 – Darren Young, American wrestler
- 1985 – Danny Amendola, American football player
- 1986 – Andy Rautins, American-Canadian basketball player
- 1987 – Danny Cipriani, English rugby player
- 1988 – Lisa Bowman, Irish netball player
- 1988 – Julia Görges, German tennis player
- 1989 – Tibor Pleiß, German basketball player
- 1989 – Natalie Pluskota, American tennis player
- 1989 – Luke Schenn, Canadian ice hockey player
- 1990 – Christopher Dibon, Austrian footballer
- 1990 – Kendall Schmidt, American singer, songwriter, and actor
- 1991 – Jimmy Garoppolo, American football player
- 1994 – Shaq Coulthirst, English footballer
- 1995 – Hanna Öberg, Swedish biathlete
- 1997 – Filip Hronek, Czech ice hockey player
- 1997 – Davis Keillor-Dunn, English footballer
- 1998 – Jordan Love, American football player
- 1999 – Park Woo-jin, South Korean singer
- 2000 – Alphonso Davies, Canadian soccer player
- 2001 – Moisés Caicedo, Ecuadorian footballer

== Deaths ==
=== Pre-1600 ===
- 1083 – Matilda of Flanders, Queen Consort of England (born 1031)
- 1148 – Saint Malachy (born 1094)
- 1261 – Bettisia Gozzadini (born 1209)
- 1319 – John Sandale, Bishop of Winchester
- 1483 – Henry Stafford, 2nd Duke of Buckingham, English politician, Lord High Constable of England (born 1454)
- 1521 – Margaret of Lorraine, Duchess of Alençon and nun (born 1463)

=== 1601–1900 ===
- 1610 – Richard Bancroft, English archbishop and academic (born 1544)
- 1852 – Pyotr Kotlyarevsky, Russian general (born 1782)
- 1863 – Theodore Judah, American engineer (born 1826)
- 1883 – William Morgan, English-Australian politician, 14th Premier of South Australia (born 1828)
- 1887 – Alfred Domett, English-New Zealand poet and politician, 4th Prime Minister of New Zealand (born 1811)
- 1887 – Jenny Lind, Swedish operatic soprano (born 1820)
- 1893 – Daniel Payne, American educator and bishop of the African Methodist Episcopal Church (born 1811)
- 1898 – George Goyder, English-Australian surveyor (born 1826)

=== 1901–present ===
- 1905 – Albert von Kölliker, Swiss anatomist and physiologist (born 1817)
- 1911 – Kyrle Bellew, English actor (born 1850)
- 1930 – Viggo Jensen, Danish weightlifter, target shooter, and gymnast (born 1874)
- 1933 – Gao Qifeng, Chinese painter (born 1889)
- 1935 – Jock Cameron, South African cricketer (born 1905)
- 1944 – Thomas Midgley Jr., American chemist and engineer (born 1889)
- 1945 – Hélène de Pourtalès, Swiss sailor (born 1868)
- 1949 – Jerome F. Donovan, American lawyer and politician (born 1872)
- 1950 – George Bernard Shaw, Irish author, playwright, and critic, Nobel Prize laureate (born 1856)
- 1952 – Mehmet Esat Bülkat, Greek-Turkish general (born 1862)
- 1958 – Jean Couzy, French mountaineer and engineer (born 1923)
- 1959 – Michael Considine, Irish-Australian trade union leader and politician (born 1885)
- 1960 – Dimitri Mitropoulos, Greek conductor and composer (born 1896)
- 1961 – Salman bin Hamad Al Khalifa I, Hakim of Bahrain (born 1894)
- 1961 – Harriet Bosse, Swedish-Norwegian actress (born 1878)
- 1961 – James Thurber, American humorist and cartoonist (born 1894)
- 1963 – 1963 South Vietnamese coup
  - Ngô Đình Diệm, South Vietnamese politician, 1st President of the Republic of Vietnam (South Vietnam) (born 1901)
  - Ngô Đình Nhu, South Vietnamese politician and tactical strategist (born 1910)
- 1966 – Peter Debye, Dutch-American physicist and chemist, Nobel Prize laureate (born 1884)
- 1966 – Mississippi John Hurt, American singer-songwriter and guitarist (born 1892)
- 1970 – Richard Cushing, American cardinal (born 1895)
- 1970 – Pierre Veyron, French race car driver (born 1903)
- 1971 – Robert Mensah, Ghanaian footballer (born 1939)
- 1972 – Grigoriy Plaskov, Soviet artillery lieutenant (born 1898)
- 1975 – Pier Paolo Pasolini, Italian actor, director, and screenwriter (born 1922)
- 1981 – Wally Wood, American author, illustrator, and publisher (born 1927)
- 1982 – Lester Roloff, American preacher and radio host (born 1914)
- 1990 – Eliot Porter, American photographer, chemist, and academic (born 1901)
- 1991 – Irwin Allen, American director, producer, and screenwriter (born 1916)
- 1991 – Mort Shuman, American singer-songwriter and pianist (born 1936)
- 1992 – Robert Arneson, American sculptor and academic (born 1930)
- 1992 – Hal Roach, American actor, director, producer, and screenwriter (born 1892)
- 1994 – Peter Matthew Hillsman Taylor, American novelist, short-story writer, and playwright (born 1917)
- 1996 – Eva Cassidy, American singer (born 1963)
- 1996 – John G. Crommelin, American admiral and politician (born 1902)
- 1998 – Vincent Winter, Scottish actor and production manager (born 1957)
- 2000 – Robert Cormier, American journalist and author (born 1925)
- 2002 – Charles Sheffield, American physicist and author (born 1935)
- 2003 – Frank McCloskey, American sergeant, lawyer, and politician (born 1939)
- 2004 – Zayed bin Sultan Al Nahyan, the 1st president and founder of the UAE (born 1918)
- 2004 – Theo van Gogh, Dutch actor, director, and producer (born 1957)
- 2005 – Ferruccio Valcareggi, Italian footballer and manager (born 1919)
- 2007 – Charmaine Dragun, Australian journalist (born 1978)
- 2007 – Igor Moiseyev, Russian dancer and choreographer (born 1906)
- 2007 – The Fabulous Moolah, American wrestler (born 1923)
- 2008 – Madelyn Dunham, American banker and business executive (born 1922)
- 2009 – José Luis López Vázquez, Spanish actor, costume designer and assistant director (born 1922)
- 2009 – Nien Cheng, Chinese-American author (born 1915)
- 2010 – Clyde King, American baseball player and manager (born 1924)
- 2011 – Boots Plata, Filipino director and screenwriter (born 1943)
- 2012 – Shreeram Shankar Abhyankar, Indian-American mathematician and academic (born 1930)
- 2012 – Robert Morton Duncan, American soldier and judge (born 1927)
- 2012 – Joe Ginsberg, American baseball player (born 1926)
- 2012 – Pino Rauti, Italian journalist and politician (born 1926)
- 2012 – Han Suyin, Chinese-Swiss physician and author (born 1916)
- 2012 – Kinjarapu Yerran Naidu, Indian politician (born 1957)
- 2013 – Walt Bellamy, American basketball player (born 1939)
- 2013 – Ghislaine Dupont, French journalist (born 1956)
- 2013 – Clifford Nass, American author and academic (born 1958)
- 2013 – Kjell Qvale, Norwegian-American businessman (born 1919)
- 2014 – Acker Bilk, English singer and clarinet player (born 1929)
- 2014 – Michael Coleman, American singer-songwriter and guitarist (born 1956)
- 2014 – Veljko Kadijević, Croatian general and politician, 5th Federal Secretary of People's Defence (born 1925)
- 2014 – Herman Sarkowsky, German-American businessman and philanthropist, co-founded the Seattle Seahawks (born 1925)
- 2014 – Shabtai Teveth, Israeli historian and author (born 1925)
- 2015 – Andrzej Ciechanowiecki, Polish painter, historian, and academic (born 1924)
- 2015 – Mike Davies, Welsh-American tennis player and businessman (born 1936)
- 2015 – Roy Dommett, English scientist and engineer (born 1933)
- 2015 – Tommy Overstreet, American singer-songwriter and guitarist (born 1937)
- 2017 – Aboubacar Somparé, Guinean politician (born 1944)
- 2018 – Raymond Chow, Hong Kong film producer (born 1927)
- 2019 – Walter Mercado, Puerto Rican television personality, astrologer, actor, and dancer (born 1932)
- 2021 – Neal Smith, American politician (born 1920)
- 2022 – Atilio Stampone, Argentine pianist and composer (born 1926)
- 2023 – Humaira Himu, Bangladeshi actress (born 1985)
- 2024 – Janey Godley, Scottish actor, writer and comedian (born 1961)
- 2024 – Alan Rachins, American actor (born 1942)
- 2024 – Paul Stephenson, British civil rights activist (born 1937)

== Holidays and observances ==
- Christian feast day:
  - Agapius and companions
  - Domninus of Vienne
  - Erc of Slane (Ireland)
  - Justus of Trieste
  - Malachy
  - Blessed Margaret of Lorraine
  - Victorinus of Pettau
  - Winifred
  - November 2 (Eastern Orthodox liturgics)
- All Souls' Day (Roman Catholic Church and Anglican Communion)
- Coronation of Haile Selassie (Rastafari)
- Day of the Dead, the second day of Day of the Dead or El Dia de los Muertos celebration (Mexico)
- Dziady (Belarus)
- Arrival of Indentured Labourers (Mauritius)
- International Day to End Impunity for Crimes Against Journalists (United Nations)
- Statehood Day (North Dakota and South Dakota, United States)
