= November 3 (Eastern Orthodox liturgics) =

Day in the Eastern Orthodox liturgical calendar

Eastern Orthodox liturgical calendar
November 2	November 3	November 4
November 3 O.S. ≍ November 16 N.S. November 3 N.S ≍ October 21 O.S.

An Eastern Orthodox cross

November 3 in Eastern Orthodox liturgical calendars is a feast day and a day of commemoration of saints and martyrs. Although some Orthodox churches use the Revised Julian Calendar and others use the traditional Julian calendar, the fixed commemorations for their respective November 3 are broadly the same, no matter which calendar is used. (Note: Despite the dates being the same, the days to which they refer typically differ by 13 days. The notation Old Style or O.S. is sometimes used to indicate a date in the traditional Julian Calendar (the "Old Calendar"). The notation New Style or N.S. indicates a date in the Revised Julian calendar (the "New Calendar").)

== Saints ==
- Martyrs Dassios, Severus, Andronas, Theodotus and Theodoti, by the sword.
- Martyrs Atticus, Agapius, Eudoxius, Carterius, Istucarius (Styrax), Pactobius (Tobias), Nictopolion, and companions, at Sebaste (320) (see also: November 2 )
- The Holy 9 Martyrs, by the sword.
- The Holy 28 Martyrs, by fire.
- Hieromartyrs Acepsimas of Hnaita, Bishop (376), Joseph the Presbyter (377), and Aeithalas the Deacon (377), of Persia.
- Saint Snandulia of Persia (380)
- Saint Achaemonides (or Hormisdas), Confessor, of Persia (4th century)
- Venerable Acepsimas, hermit, of Cyrrhus in Syria (4th century)
- Venerable Elias of Egypt. (Note: For 70 years he practiced asceticism as a hermit on a mountain near the city of Antinous, Egypt and died in peace.)
- Saint Theodore the Confessor, Bishop of Ancyra (8th-9th century)

== Pre-Schism Western saints ==
- Saint Papulus (Papoul), a priest who worked with St Saturninus in France and like him was martyred under Diocletian (c. 300) (Note: His shrine is in Toulouse.)
- The Innumerable Martyrs of Saragossa (304) (Note: An exceedingly large number of martyrs put to death in Saragossa under Diocletian by the savage prefect Dacian, who had been sent to Spain to enforce the decrees. He published an edict exiling all Orthodox from the city, and while they were leaving he ordered the soldiers to fall upon and massacre them. Eighteen of them are honoured separately on April 16.)
- Saint Valentine and Hilary, a priest and his deacon, beheaded at Viterbo near Rome under Diocletian (c. 304) (Note: "At Viterbo, during the persecution of Maximian, the holy martyrs Valentine, priest, and Hilary, deacon. For attachment to the faith of Christ, they were cast into the Tiber with a stone tied to them, but being miraculously rescued by an angel, they were beheaded, and thus were crowned with the glory of martyrdom.")
- Saint Florus of Lodève (Flour), first Bishop of Lodève in Languedoc in France (389) (Note: The town where his relics are enshrined is named after him. See: (in French) Flour (évêque). Wikipédia. (French Wikipedia).)
- Saint Valentinian, Bishop of Salerno in the south of Italy (c. 500)
- Saint Gwenhael, born in Brittany, he became a monk at Landévennec Abbey with St Winwalöe, where he later became abbot (c. 550)
- Saint Sylvia, the mother of St Gregory the Great (c. 572) (Note: A chapel was built in her honour over her house on the Coelian Hill in Rome.) (see also: November 4)
- Saint Gaudiosus of Tarazona, a monk in Asan in the Pyrenees in Spain under St Victorian, later the Bishop of Tarazona (c. 585)
- Saint Clether (Clydawg, Cledog, Clodock), a hermit in Herefordshire (6th century) (Note: Born in Wales, he was a hermit in Herefordshire, now in England. The village of Clodock is named after him.)
- Saint Elerius, Abbot of a monastery in North Wales (6th century)
- Saint Winifred of Holywell (Winifred of Treffynon), Wales (630) (Note: Born in Wales and a niece of St Beuno, she was beheaded by a prince for refusing his advances. A spring of water gushed forth where her head had fallen. This was the origin of her holy well which has been a centre of pilgrimage ever since.)
- Saint Domnus of Vienne (Domnolus), Bishop of Vienne, Confessor (657) (Note: Successor of St Desiderius the Martyr as Bishop of Vienne in France. He was zealous in ransoming captives.)
- Saint Rumwold of Buckingham (Rumwald of Brackley), infant Prince of Northumbria (662) (Note: A three-day-old infant and prince, who professed the Faith immediately after baptism and then died.)
- Saint Cristiolus, brother of St Sulian and founder of churches, including one in Anglesey in Wales (7th century)
- Saint Vulganius, a Celt who went to France and enlightened the Atrebati, finally living as a hermit in Arras (c. 704) (Note: "ST. VULGANIUS is stated in some ancient records to have been a native of Great Britain, but it is more probable that he was in reality an Irishman. He went over to the Continent, and led a solitary life in Artois. The cell in which he lived and died is not far from the Abbey of St. Vedast, in Arras. He preached the Faith to the people, and by some authors is called a Bishop. The Collegiate Church of Lens is dedicated to him, and he is regarded as the Patron of that place. His festival was observed at Canterbury, as may be supposed, on account of some conspicuous relic possessed by that church.")
- Saint Hubert, Bishop of Liege (727) (Note: A widowed courtier who devoted his life to the Faith. By tradition he was converted while hunting. He probably became a monk at Stavelot in Belgium. Eventually he succeeded St Lambert as Bishop of Maastricht in the Netherlands (c 706).) (Note: See also: September 20 - Great-martyr Eustathius Placidas (died AD 118), who similarly had a vision of a cross while hunting a stag. Both St. Eustace and St. Hubert are patron saints of hunters.)
- Saint Pirmin, Bishop and monastic founder in Germany (753) (Note: Born in Spain of Visigothic descent. When the Saracens invaded Spain, he fled and went to the Rhineland in Germany, where he established several monasteries - Reichenau in 724, Murbach, Amorbach - and restored others, notably Dissentis. He also became a bishop.)
- Saint Wulgan, a holy man born in Canterbury in England, where his relics were later venerated (8th century)
- Saints Acheric and William, hermits at a monastery in the Vosges in France (c. 860)
- Saint Englatius (Englat, Tanglen), possibly a bishop, he lived in Tarves in Aberdeenshire in Scotland (966)
- Saint Hermengaudius (Ermengol, Armengol), Bishop of Urgell in Spain (1035) (Note: He built the Cathedral there.)

== Post-Schism Orthodox saints ==
- Saint Anna Vsevolodovna of Kiev, Princess, daughter of Prince Vsevolod I of Kiev (1112) (Note: See: (in Russian) Анна Всеволодовна. Википедии. (Russian Wikipedia).)
- Saint Nicholas of Iveron (Mt. Athos) and Georgia, hymnographer (1308)
- New Hieromartyr George, priest, of Neopolis, Asia Minor (1797)

=== New martyrs and confessors ===
- New Hieromartyr Nicholas Dinariev, Presbyter (1918)
- New Martyr Paul Parfenov (1918)
- New Hieromartyrs (1937):

- Basil Archangelsky; (Note: See: (in Russian) Архангельский, Василий Васильевич. Википедии. (Russian Wikipedia).) Peter Orlenkov; Basil Pokrovsky; Alexander Zverev; Vladimir Pisarev; Sergius Kedrov; Nicholas Pyatnitsky; Vicentius Smirnov; John Kesarisky; Peter Kosmenkov; Alexander Parusnikov; Paul Andreev; and Cosmas Petrychenko, Priests;
- Simeon Krechkov, Deacon.

- New Martyr Evdokia Safronova (1938)
- New Hieromartyr Sergius Stanislavlev, Deacon (1942)

== Other commemorations ==
- Translation of the holy relics of the Holy Great Martyr George the Trophy-bearer, and Dedication of the Church of the Great-martyr George in Lydda (4th century)
- Translation of the holy relics (987) of St. Edith of Wilton, English nun (984).
- Translation of the holy relics (1796) of the New Great-martyr Apostolos (1686) from Constantinople to Agios Lavrentios in Pelion, Thessaly. (Note: Great-martyr Apostolos' feast day is on August 16.)
- Repose of Hieroschemamonk Daniil (Tudor) of Romania (1962)

== Icon gallery ==
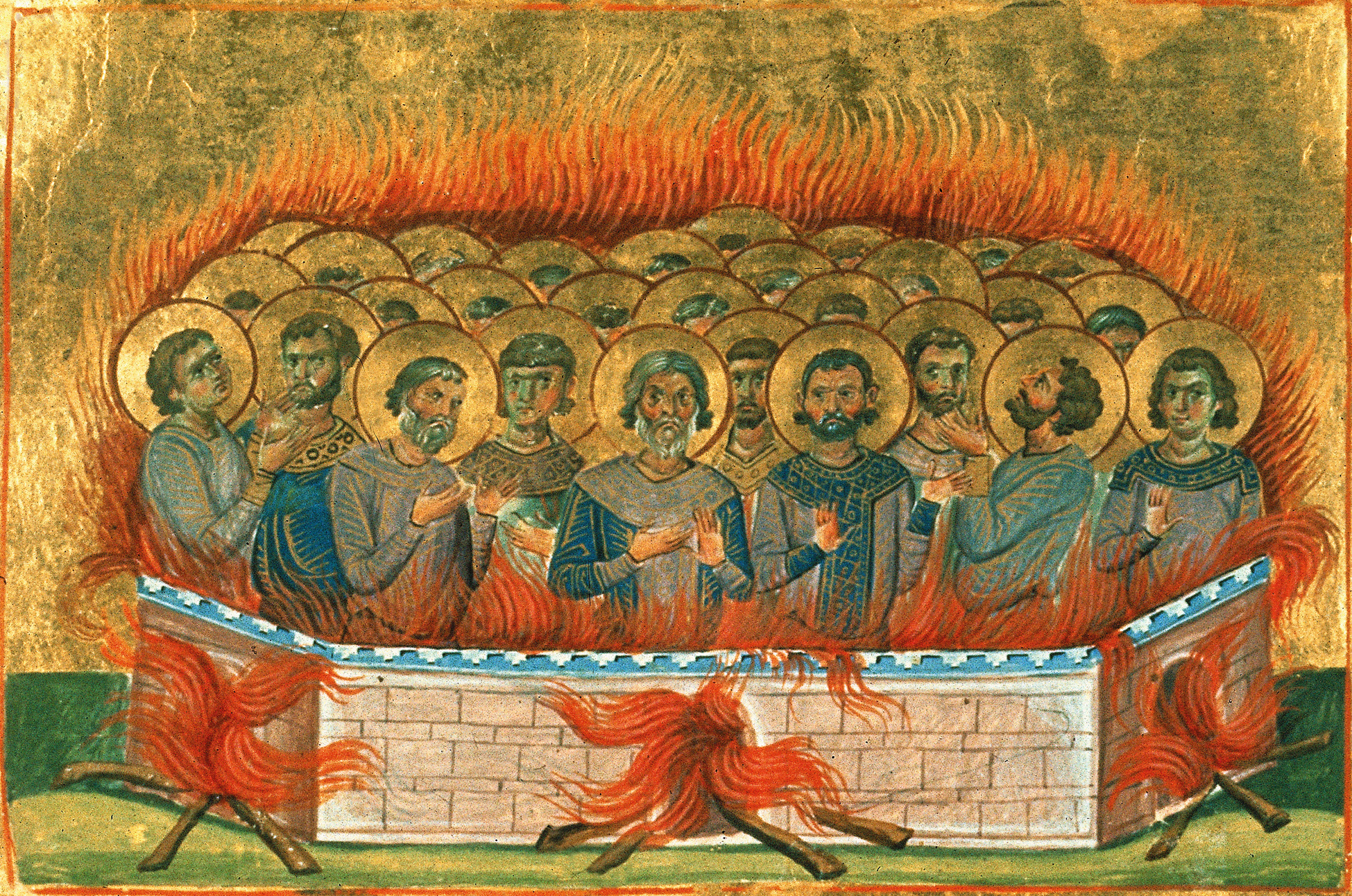
Martyrs Agapius, Atticus, Carterius, Styriacus (Styrax, Istucarius), Tobias (Pactobius), Eudoxius, Nictopolion, and Companions.
(Menologion of Basil II, 10th century).

Hieromartyrs Acepsimas of Hnaita the Bishop, Joseph the Presbyter, and Aeithalas the Deacon, of Persia.
(Menologion of Basil II, 10th century).

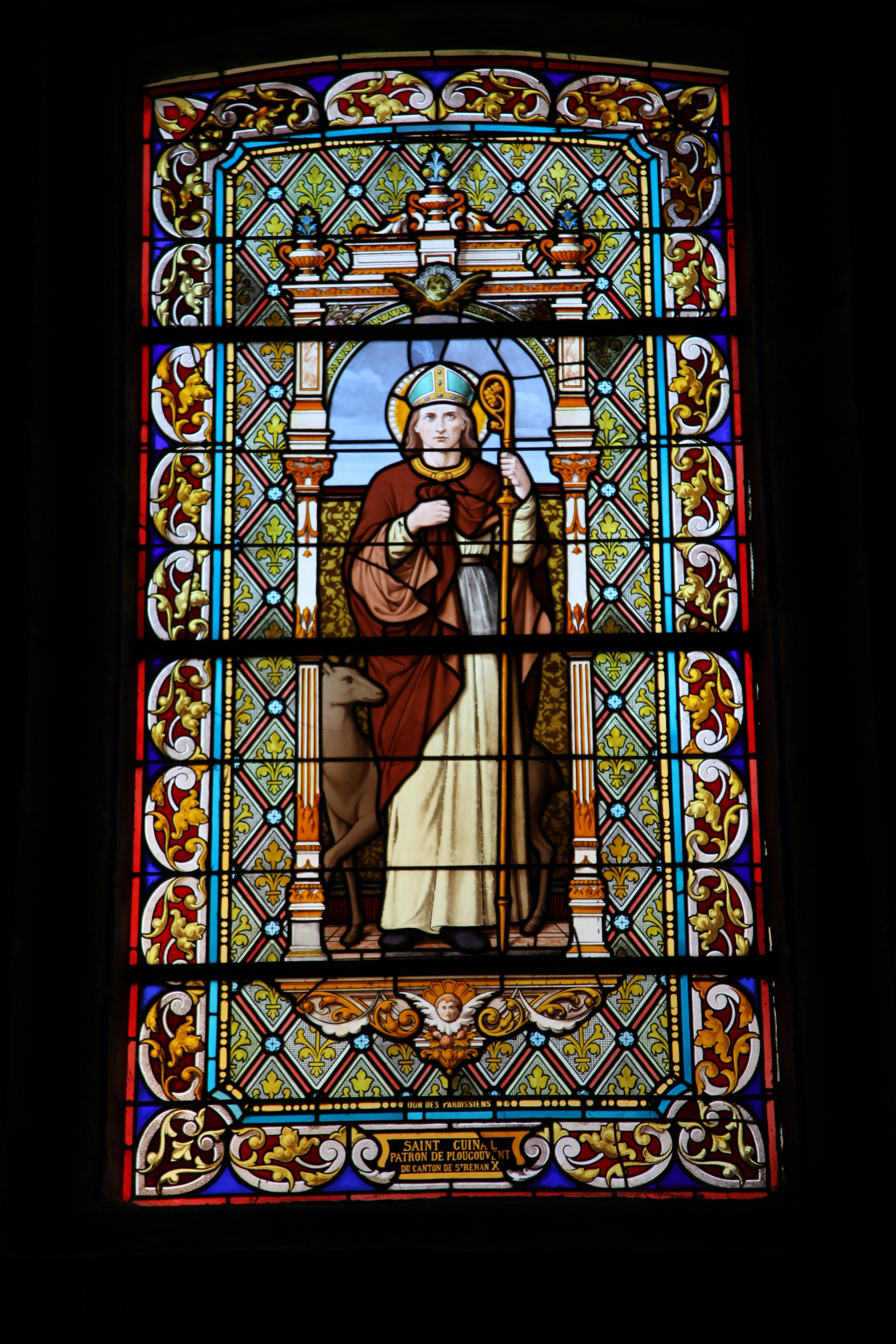
St. Gwenhael.

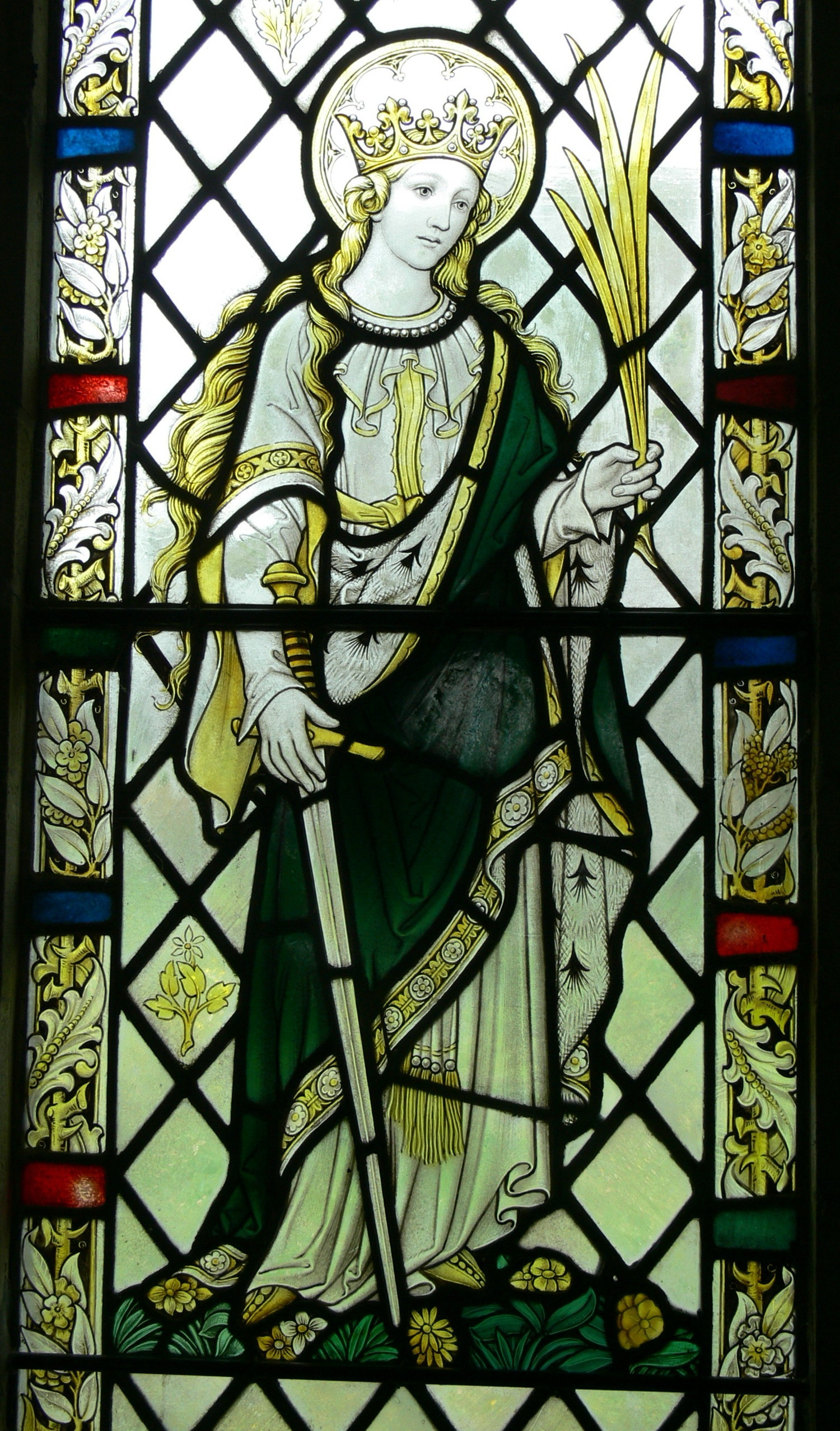
St. Winifred of Holywell.

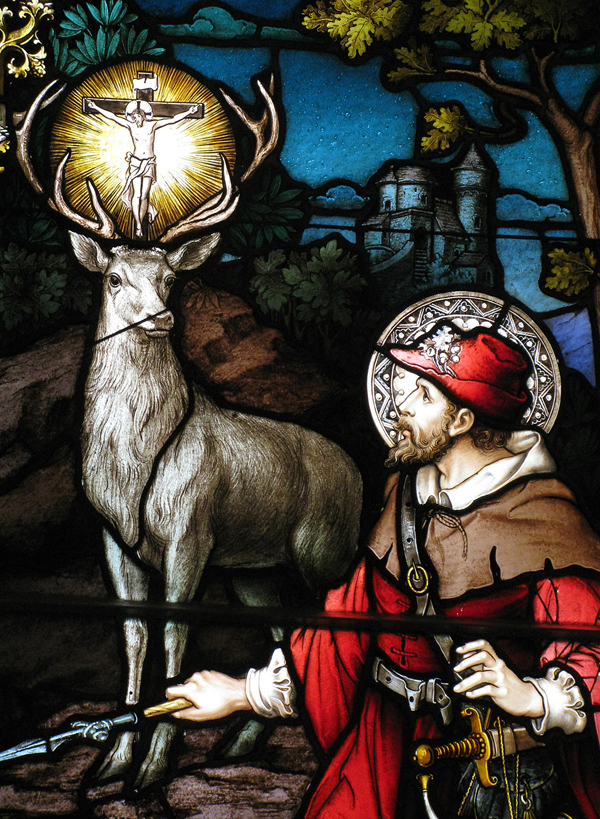
St. Hubert, Bishop of Liege.

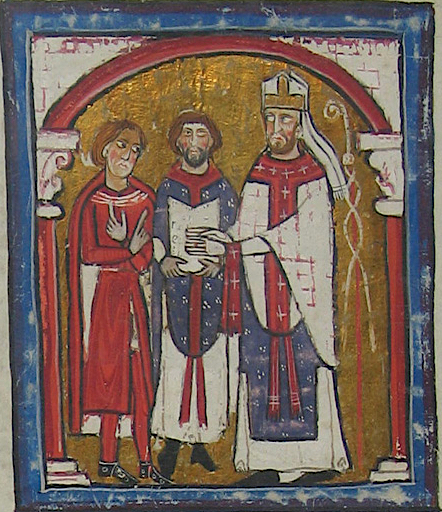
Consecration of St. Hermengaudius (Ermengol).

New Hieromartyr Basil Archangelsky, Archpriest.

New Hieromartyr Peter Orlenkov, Priest.

New Hieromartyr Alexander Zverev, Archpriest.

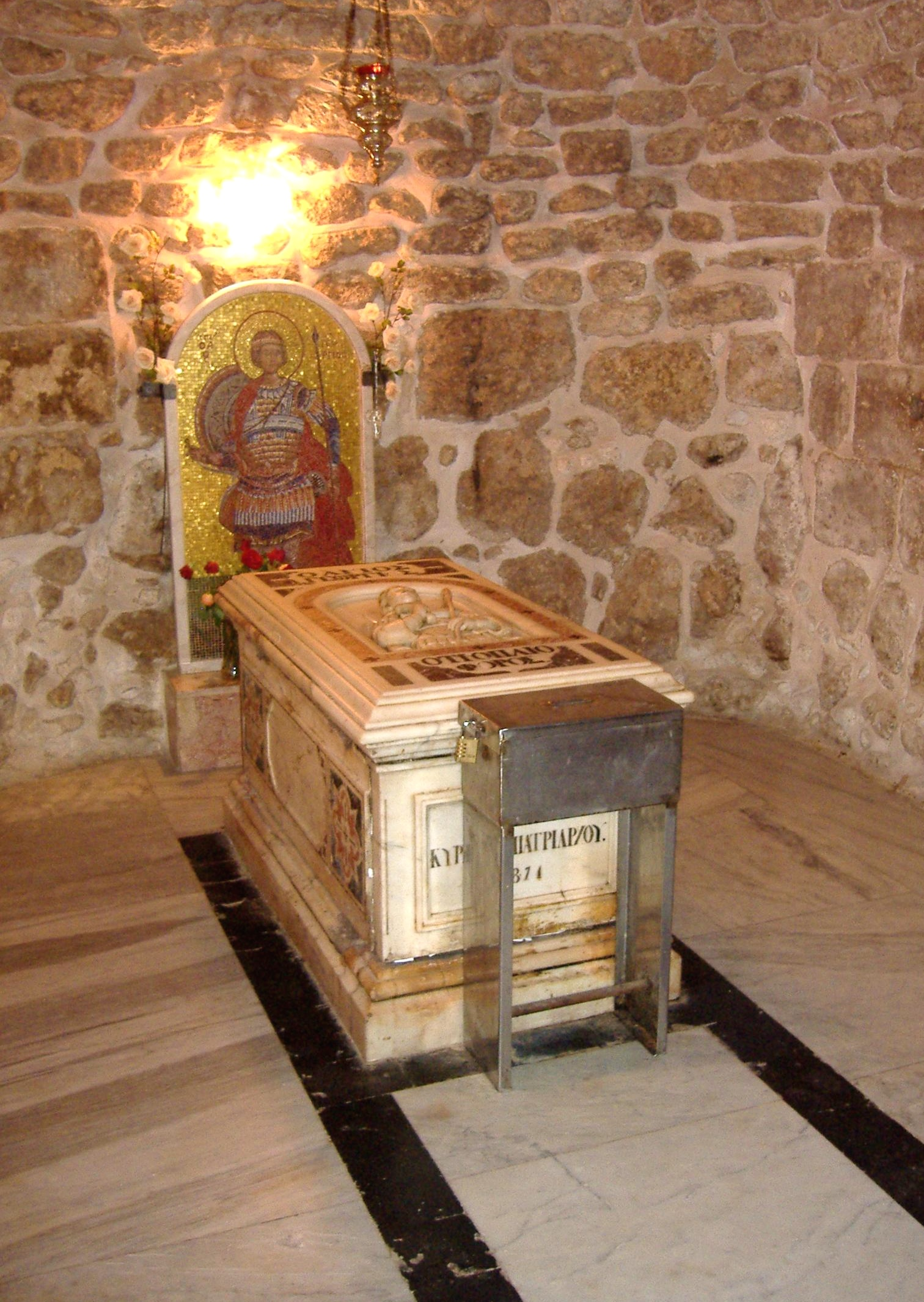
The tomb of Saint George in Lod, Israel.

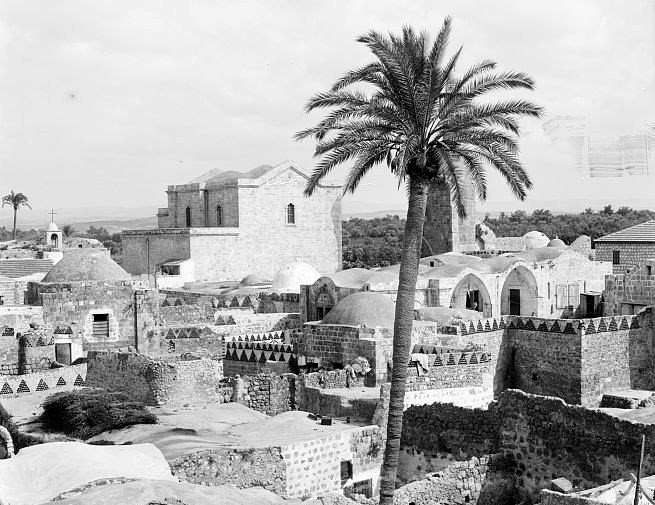
Church of the Great-martyr George in Lydda (c. 1920).

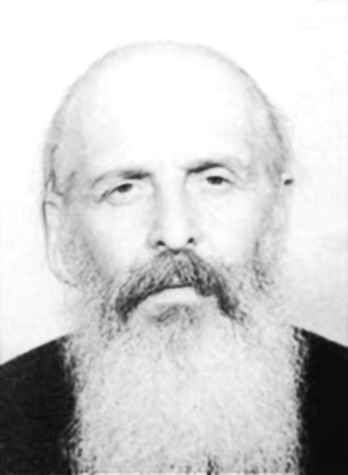
Hiero-schemamonk Daniil (Tudor) of Romania.

== Sources ==
- November 3/November 16. Orthodox Calendar (PRAVOSLAVIE.RU).
- November 16 / November 3. HOLY TRINITY RUSSIAN ORTHODOX CHURCH (A parish of the Patriarchate of Moscow).
- November 3. OCA - The Lives of the Saints.
- The Autonomous Orthodox Metropolia of Western Europe and the Americas (ROCOR). St. Hilarion Calendar of Saints for the year of our Lord 2004. St. Hilarion Press (Austin, TX). p. 82.
- The Third Day of the Month of November. Orthodoxy in China.
- November 3. Latin Saints of the Orthodox Patriarchate of Rome.
- The Roman Martyrology. Transl. by the Archbishop of Baltimore. Last Edition, According to the Copy Printed at Rome in 1914. Revised Edition, with the Imprimatur of His Eminence Cardinal Gibbons. Baltimore: John Murphy Company, 1916. pp. 339–340.
- Rev. Richard Stanton. A Menology of England and Wales, or, Brief Memorials of the Ancient British and English Saints Arranged According to the Calendar, Together with the Martyrs of the 16th and 17th Centuries. London: Burns & Oates, 1892. pp. 522–524.

Greek Sources

- Great Synaxaristes: (in Greek) 3 ΝΟΕΜΒΡΙΟΥ. ΜΕΓΑΣ ΣΥΝΑΞΑΡΙΣΤΗΣ.
- (in Greek) Συναξαριστής. 3 Νοεμβρίου. ECCLESIA.GR. (H ΕΚΚΛΗΣΙΑ ΤΗΣ ΕΛΛΑΔΟΣ).
- (in Greek) 03/11/2015. Ορθόδοξος Συναξαριστής.

Russian Sources

- (in Russian) 16 ноября (3 ноября). Православная Энциклопедия под редакцией Патриарха Московского и всея Руси Кирилла (электронная версия). (Orthodox Encyclopedia - Pravenc.ru).
- (in Russian) 3 ноября по старому стилю / 16 ноября по новому стилю. Русская Православная Церковь - Православный церковный календарь на 2015 год.
