= Styrax (disambiguation) =

Styrax can refer to:

- Styrax is a genus of about 130 species of large shrubs or small trees
- Styrax resin
- Saint Styrax was martyred along with Agapius, Atticus, Carterius, and others in 310 AD.
- Styrax is also the companion of the She-Ra: Princess of Power villain Shadow Weaver.
- Styrax is the race horse that won the 1895 Grand Steeple-Chase de Paris.
