= Gmina Białobrzegi =

Gmina Białobrzegi may refer to either of the following administrative districts in Poland:

- Gmina Białobrzegi, Masovian Voivodeship
- Gmina Białobrzegi, Subcarpathian Voivodeship
