= Wola Dalsza =

- Village
- Location within Poland
- Coordinates: 50°7′N 22°16′E
- Country: Poland
- Voivodeship: Subcarpathian
- County: Łańcut
- Gmina: Białobrzegi
- Time zone: UTC+1 (CET)
  - Summer (DST): UTC+2 (CEST)

Wola Dalsza [ˈvɔla ˈdalʂa] is a village in the administrative district of Gmina Białobrzegi, within Łańcut County, Subcarpathian Voivodeship, in south-eastern Poland.

Five Polish citizens were murdered by Nazi Germany in the village during World War II.
