= LOT Polish Airlines Flight 703 =

1988 aviation accident in Poland

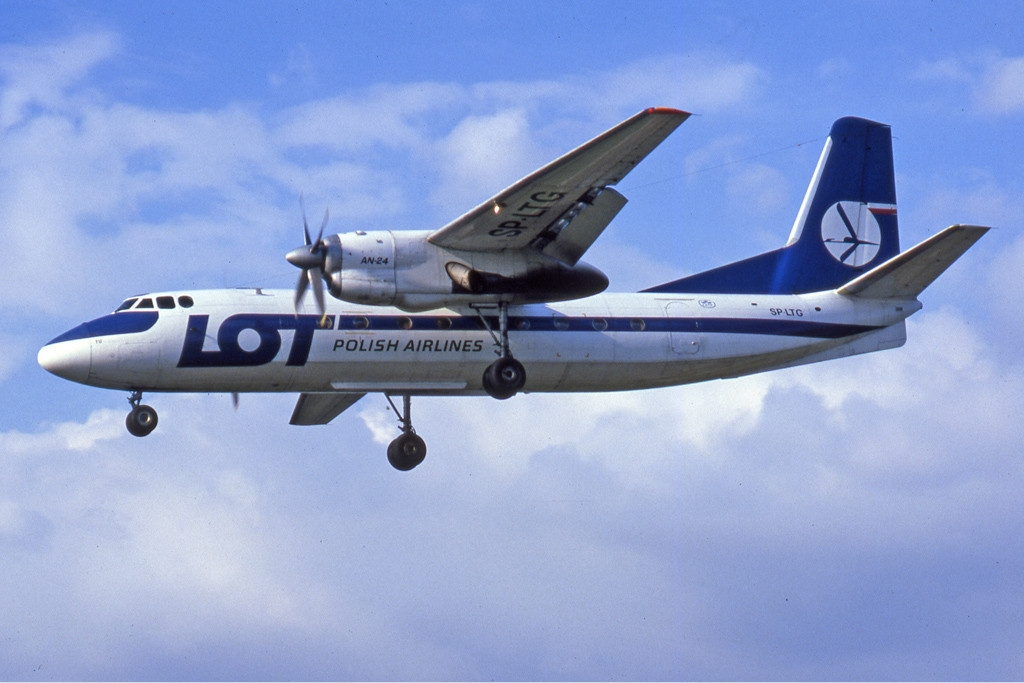
- A LOT Polish Airlines Antonov An-24, similar to the aircraft involved in the accident

Accident
- Date: 2 November 1988
- Summary: Crashed following attempted emergency landing after a dual engine failure
- Site: Białobrzegi, Poland; 50°06′05″N 22°19′25″E

Aircraft
- Aircraft type: Antonov An-24B
- Aircraft name: Dunajec
- Operator: LOT Polish Airlines
- Registration: SP-LTD
- Flight origin: Warsaw Okęcie Airport
- Destination: Rzeszów–Jasionka Airport
- Occupants: 29
- Passengers: 25
- Crew: 4
- Fatalities: 1
- Injuries: 12
- Survivors: 28

On 2 November 1988, LOT Polish Airlines Flight 703, an Antonov An-24 operating a scheduled domestic passenger flight from Warsaw Okęcie Airport to Rzeszów Airport in Poland, crashed short of the runway after an attempted emergency landing following a dual engine failure. Of the 25 passengers and 4 crew members, 1 passenger was killed, while 12 people were injured. As of 2026, the accident remains the last crash involving the airline.

The investigation concluded that the flight crew's failure to activate the aircraft's de-icing system led to both engines failing. Following the accident, the airline accelerated the withdrawal of its fleet of An-24s and replaced them with the ATR 72.

== Background ==
=== Aircraft ===
The aircraft involved was a 22-year-old Antonov An-24B registered as SP-LTD and named Dunajec. It was purchased in April 1966 and put into service on 5 April 1966. The Antonov An-24 is a Soviet-built twin-engine turboprop aircraft, entering commercial service in 1963. The aircraft can seat up to 50 people, with the aircraft involved having a capacity of up to 48 seats. The aircraft was used to operate LOT Polish Airlines' domestic flights, along with 11 other An-24s.

=== Passengers and crew ===
There were 25 passengers and 4 crew members, with radio journalist Tomasz Beksiński among the passengers on board the aircraft. Of the passengers, four were foreigners: one British, one American, and two Dutch. In addition, there were two undercover officers posing as passengers who were part of the Milicja Obywatelska, ensuring the aircraft's safety.

The flight crew consisted of captain Kazimierz Rożek, who had 30 years of flying experience, first officer Waldemar Wolski, flight engineer Marek Lubicz-Nowicki, and flight attendant Elżbieta Żychlińska.

== Accident ==
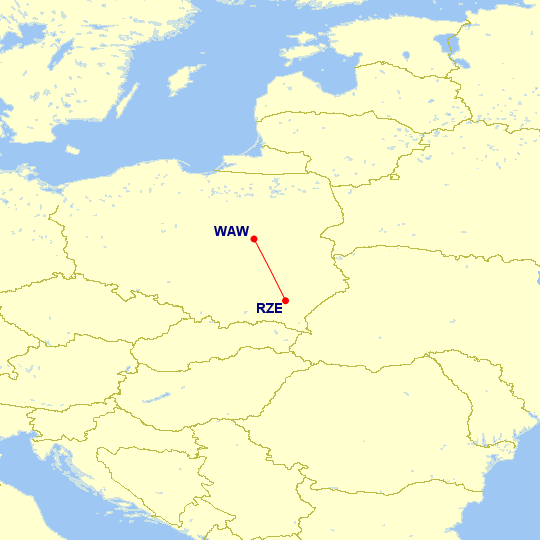
Flight path of Flight 703

On 2 November 1988, the aircraft was operating a scheduled domestic passenger from Warsaw Chopin Airport to Rzeszów–Jasionka Airport. On the day of the crash, weather conditions along the flight route included fog and dense low-ceilinged clouds, potentially complicating takeoff and landings. Before takeoff, Rzeszów–Jasionka Airport relayed that the weather had improved and that the flight could proceed. In addition, Flight 703 would be piloted by the first officer, with the captain acting as the instructor.

At either 09:28, 09:30, or 09:38 a.m., the aircraft took off from Warsaw Chopin Airport en route to Rzeszów–Jasionka Airport; the flight proceeded uneventfully. At 10:07, the aircraft passed Jędrzejów and turned to prepare for a landing on Runway 27 at Rzeszów–Jasionka Airport; the landing pattern required the aircraft to fly over the airport, perform a circuit, and then approach the airport from the east. At that point, conditions at the airport included light winds at around 25 km/h (16 mph), visibility extending until 6 km (3.7 mi), a completely overcast sky with a cloud base at 1,300 m (4,300 ft), with an outside temperature of 4 °C (39 °F). The air traffic controler on duty then cleared the aircraft to descend to 1,700 m (5,600 ft) heading towards the airport's radio beacon. Two minutes later, the air traffic controller cleared a descent to 1,500 m (4,900 ft).

At 10:25 a.m., the aircraft flew over the airport and the pilot was cleared to proceed with the intermediate and final approaches. He was also instructed to report when the aircraft was lined up with Runway 27's instrument landing system. Performing the intermediate approach, the pilot extended the landing gear and flaps and as he was turning the aircraft towards Runway 27, engines failed. At 10:31, the air traffic controller attempted multiple times to contact the aircraft after the pilot failed to confirm that the aircraft was lined up with Runway 27 but received no response. The failure of the engines resulted in the loss of electrical power and communication with the ground.

The aircraft began to rapidly descend, at a rate of 30 metres per second (98 ft/s) according to the captain. As the captain slowed the descent rate, he started searching for a field to use as a landing location and the crew retracted the landing gear and flaps. Concluding that an attempt to land at the airport was unfeasible, the captain decided to perform an emergency landing on a field near the village of Białobrzegi that was long and relatively flat. The landing gear was unable to extend, so the captain, with the help of the first officer, attempted a gear-up landing on the field.

At 10:28 a.m., the aircraft touched down short of its destination. The force of the impact ripped some seats off their mounts. After the impact, the plane continued advancing for several hundred meters, bouncing off the field and overflying drainage ditches, with parts of the aircraft and one of its engines detaching. After coming to a stop, the passengers and crew began evacuations. Leaking fuel resulted in a fire immediately breaking out. The cabin began filling with smoke; lights were rendered inoperable, and the exit was blocked by ripped-out seats. Although nearly all occupants managed to evacuate, a 69-year-old passenger remained trapped between crushed seats. The aircraft's fuel tanks then exploded. Of the 29 occupants, 28 survived, while the 69-year-old passenger was killed. Twelve people sustained injuries, five serious, while seven others sustained concussions. The 16 others did not suffer any injuries.

The accident was the airline's first plane crash since LOT Polish Airlines Flight 5055 on 9 May 1987, and as of 2026, is the last crash involving the airline.

== Aftermath ==
The burnt-out wreckage of the aircraft

A minute after the crash, emergency medical services were called. Among the first to arrive and help the injured were residents of Rogoźno. Soon after, private cars approached the crash site, and around 12 minutes later, ambulances and firetrucks arrived. Additional ambulances, firetrucks, and police cars were sent to the scene of the crash, along with helicopters, less than an hour after the crash.

The Polish Press Agency (PAP) originally reported that 16 people had been killed. The report was later retracted, confirming the account of a local police officer who told the Associated Press that one person had been killed, as officials from LOT Polish Airlines said that the confusion might have been caused by several passengers leaving the crash site, before making their way to a nearby road and hitching rides from motorists, leading authorities into initially presuming that they were dead. A hospital in Łańcut treated 13 people, hospitalizing 3 of them. Another two were hospitalized in Rzeszów.

The captain was initially hailed as a hero. The accident led to a debate on the state of training of Polish pilots, and the accelerated withdrawal of the Antonov An-24 from the airline's fleet, which was subsequently replaced with the ATR 72. Prior to 1988, two of the airline's An-24s had crashed. (Note: LOT Polish Airlines Flight 165 in 1969 and LOT Polish Airlines Flight 691 in 1981.)

In October 1989, the British passenger, having sustained a fractured spine, cuts, and bruises, sued the airline claiming negligence on their part "because it allowed the Antonov AN-24 aeroplane to fly when it was not mechanically fit." He claimed that the airline had inadequately maintained the aircraft, "allow[ing] both engines to cut out in mid air creating a hazard to the passengers."

== Investigation ==
The PAP said that while near the city of Rzeszów, the aircraft's engines failed. According to the Associated Press, the aircraft had "apparently" suffered a mechanical failure. LOT Polish Airlines spokesman Jerzy Wojdylo stated that the weather was good and that eyewitnesses reported an eagle hitting the aircraft. The commission of inquiry was headed by pilot Juliusz Werenicz. The aircraft's flight recorder was found on the day of the crash and sent to Warsaw the next day for examination.

Although there is no publicly available official report on the accident, in June 1989, the investigation placed blame on the crew, concluding that the crew had failed to activate the aircraft's anti-icing system in time, resulting in the air intakes of the engines clogging with ice. The engines failed as a result of being starved of air, and could not be restarted.
