= Budy Łańcuckie =

- Village
- Location within Poland
- Coordinates: 50°7′N 22°26′E
- Country: Poland
- Voivodeship: Subcarpathian
- County: Łańcut
- Gmina: Białobrzegi
- Population: 1,900
- Website: http://www.bial.regiony.pl

Budy Łańcuckie (Polish pronunciation: [ˈbudɨ waj̃ˈt͡sut͡skʲɛ]) is a village in the administrative district of Gmina Białobrzegi, within Łańcut County, Subcarpathian Voivodeship, in south-eastern Poland.
