= Korniaktów Północny =

- Village
- Location within Poland
- Coordinates: 50°6′N 22°23′E
- Country: Poland
- Voivodeship: Subcarpathian
- County: Łańcut
- Gmina: Białobrzegi

Korniaktów Północny [kɔrˈɲaktuf puu̯ˈnɔt͡snɨ] is a village in the administrative district of Gmina Białobrzegi, within Łańcut County, Subcarpathian Voivodeship, in south-eastern Poland.
