= Framecourt =

- Commune
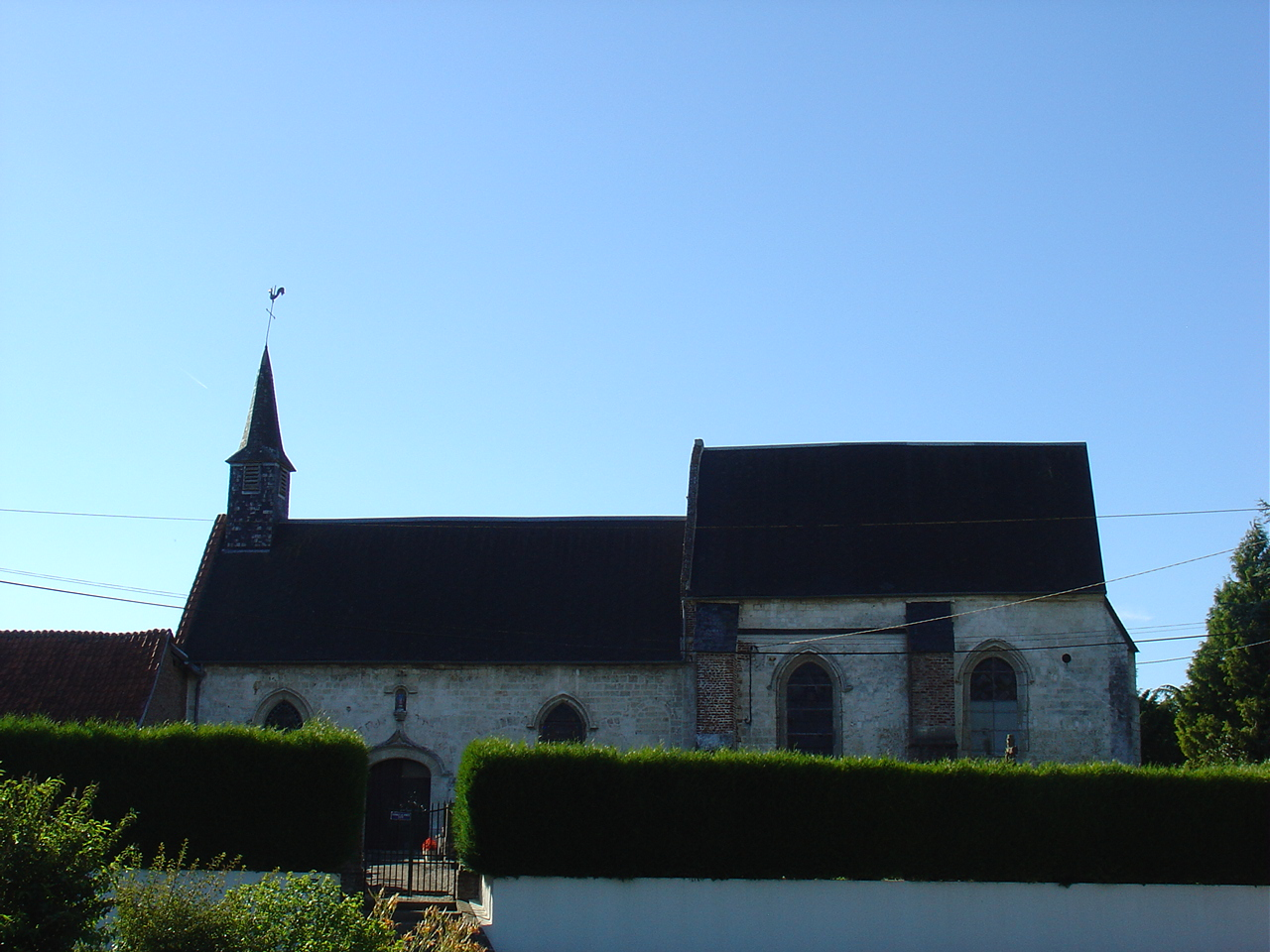
- The church of Framecourt

- Coat of arms
- Location of Framecourt
- Location within France Location within Hauts-de-France
- Coordinates: 50°19′47″N 2°18′27″E
- Country: France
- Region: Hauts-de-France
- Department: Pas-de-Calais
- Arrondissement: Arras
- Canton: Saint-Pol-sur-Ternoise
- Intercommunality: CC Ternois

Government
  - Mayor (2021–2026): Jérôme Grare
- Area^{1}: 2.28 km^{2} (0.88 sq mi)
- Elevation: 146 m (479 ft)
- Highest elevation: 150 m (490 ft)
- Lowest elevation: 128 m (420 ft)
- Population (2023): 116
  - Density: 50.9/km^{2} (132/sq mi)
- Time zone: UTC+01:00 (CET)
  - Summer (DST): UTC+02:00 (CEST)
- INSEE/Postal code: 62352 /62130
- ^{1} French Land Register data, which excludes lakes, ponds, glaciers > 1 km^{2} (0.386 sq mi or 247 acres) and river estuaries.

Framecourt (French pronunciation: [fʁamkuʁ]) is a commune in the Pas-de-Calais department in the Hauts-de-France region of France.

== Geography ==
A small farming village situated 21 miles (34 km) west of Arras, at the junction of the D916 and the D102E roads.

== Population ==
Historical population
Year	Pop.	±% p.a.
1968	117	—
1975	92	−3.38%
1982	110	+2.59%
1990	117	+0.77%
1999	113	−0.39%
2007	124	+1.17%
2012	99	−4.40%
2017	105	+1.18%
2023	116	+1.67%
Source: INSEE

== Places of interest ==
- The church of Saint Vulgan, dating from the seventeenth century.
- An eighteenth century priory.

== See also ==
- Communes of the Pas-de-Calais department
