= November 2 (Eastern Orthodox liturgics) =

Day in the Eastern Orthodox liturgical calendar

Eastern Orthodox liturgical calendar
November 1	November 2	November 3
November 2 O.S. ≍ November 15 N.S. November 2 N.S ≍ October 20 O.S.

An Eastern Orthodox cross

November 2 in Eastern Orthodox liturgical calendars is a feast day and a day of commemoration of saints and martyrs. Although some Orthodox churches use the Revised Julian Calendar and others use the traditional Julian calendar, the fixed commemorations for their respective November 2 are broadly the same, no matter which calendar is used. (Note: Despite the dates being the same, the days to which they refer typically differ by 13 days. The notation Old Style or O.S. is sometimes used to indicate a date in the traditional Julian Calendar (the "Old Calendar"). The notation New Style or N.S. indicates a date in the Revised Julian calendar (the "New Calendar").)

== Saints ==
- The Holy Senators of Sebasteia, martyrs of senatorial rank, martyred under Licinius, by fire (c. 315)
- Martyrs Eudoxios (Eudoxius), Agapios (Agapius), Atticus (Attikos), Marinus, Oceanus, Eustratios, Karterios (Carterius), Nikopolitianos (Nictopolion), Styrax (Styriacus, Istucarius), and Tobias (Pactobius), at Sebaste, martyred under Licinius (c. 315) (Note: "At Sebaste, the Saints Carterius, Styriacus, Tobias, Eudoxius, Agapius, and their companions, martyrs, under the emperor Licinius." The eight other martyrs that are given in the Great Synaxaristes in Greek are: (in Greek) "Ἀττικός, Μαρίνος, Ὠκεανός, Εὐστράτιος, Καρτέριος, Νικοπολιτιανός, Στύραξ καὶ Τωβίας.") (see also: November 3)
- Women-Martyrs Kyriaki (Cyriaca), Domnina and Domna, by the sword.
- Martyrs Acindynus, Pegasius, Aphthonius, Elpidephorus, Anempodistus, and 7,000 with them, of Persia, during the reign of King Sapor II (341) (Note: "In Persia, the holy martyrs Acindynus, Pegasius, Aphtonius, Elpidephorus and Anempodistus, with their numerous companions.")
- Saint Marcian of Cyrrhus, monk in Syria, confessor (c. 388)
- Saint Anthony the Confessor, Archbishop of Thessalonica (844)

== Pre-Schism Western saints ==
- Saint Justus of Trieste, sentenced to death by drowning (293) (Note: "At Trieste, blessed Justus, who consummated his martyrdom in the same persecution, under the governor Manatius.")
- Martyrs Publius, Victor, Hermes and Papias, in North Africa.
- Saint Victorinus of Pettau, Bishop of Pettau in Styria in Austria and the earliest exegete in the West (304) (Note: "The same day, the birthday of St. Victorinus, bishop of Poitiers, who, after writing many works, as is attested by St. Jerome, was crowned with martyrdom in the persecution of Diocletian.")
- Saint Erc of Slane, Bishop of Slane, Ireland (512) (see also: October 31)
- Saint Ambrose, abbot of the monastery of St. Moritz in Agaunum in Switzerland (532 or 582). (Note: There were two abbots of this name at the monastery of Agaunum in Switzerland.)
- Saint George of Vienne, Bishop of Vienne in Gaul (c. 699)
- Saints Baya (Bava) and Maura, Anchoresses in Scotland; St Bava guided St Maura and the latter became abbess of a convent (c. 10th century)
- Saint Amicus, born near Camerino in Italy, he became a priest, then a hermit and finally a monk at St Peter's in Fonte Avellana (c. 1045)

== Post-Schism Orthodox saints ==
- Blessed Cyprian of Storozhev, former outlaw (Olonets) (16th century)
- Archimandrite Gabriel (Urgebadze) of Georgia, Confessor and Fool-for-Christ (1995) (Note: "Память нового святого решено праздновать 20 октября (2 ноября по н.ст.).") (Note: On December 20, 2012, Archimandrite Gabriel was canonized as a ST. GABRIEL, CONFESSOR AND FOOL FOR CHRIST by the Georgian Apostolic Autocephalous Orthodox Church. Feast day on November 2: (in Georgian) www.patriarchate.ge :: Resolution of the Holy Synod of the Georgian Orthodox Church.) (New style date for old calendar feast see: October 20)

=== New martyrs and confessors ===
- New Hieromartyrs Bishop Victorin and Priest Basil Luzgin, of Glazomicha (1918)
- New Hieromartyrs Ananias Aristov of Perm, and Constantine Organov, Priests (1918)

== Other commemorations ==
- Icon of God of Shuya-Smolensk (Shuyskaya-Smolenskaya) (1654–1655) (Note: The Shuya-Smolensk Wonderworking Icon of the Mother of God was painted in the years 1654–1655 in the Resurrection parish of the city of Shuya, where an unrelenting pestilence raged. Trusting in the mercy of God and the intercession of the Mother of God, the parishioners of the Resurrection church commissioned a certain pious monk to paint the icon of the Smolensk Mother of God, an icon long attributed with being a rescuer of the Russian people from enemies and misfortune. The parishioners spent the whole week in prayer and fasting while the image was being painted. When the icon was finished, the priest and the people took it to the church and set it in a specially built place. From that time the pestilence began to ease, at first in the area of the Resurrection parish, and then also in all the city. From the Icon of the Mother of God many miracles of healing took place, especially of eye diseases. The icon is also celebrated on July 11, July 28, and Bright Tuesday.)

== Icon gallery ==
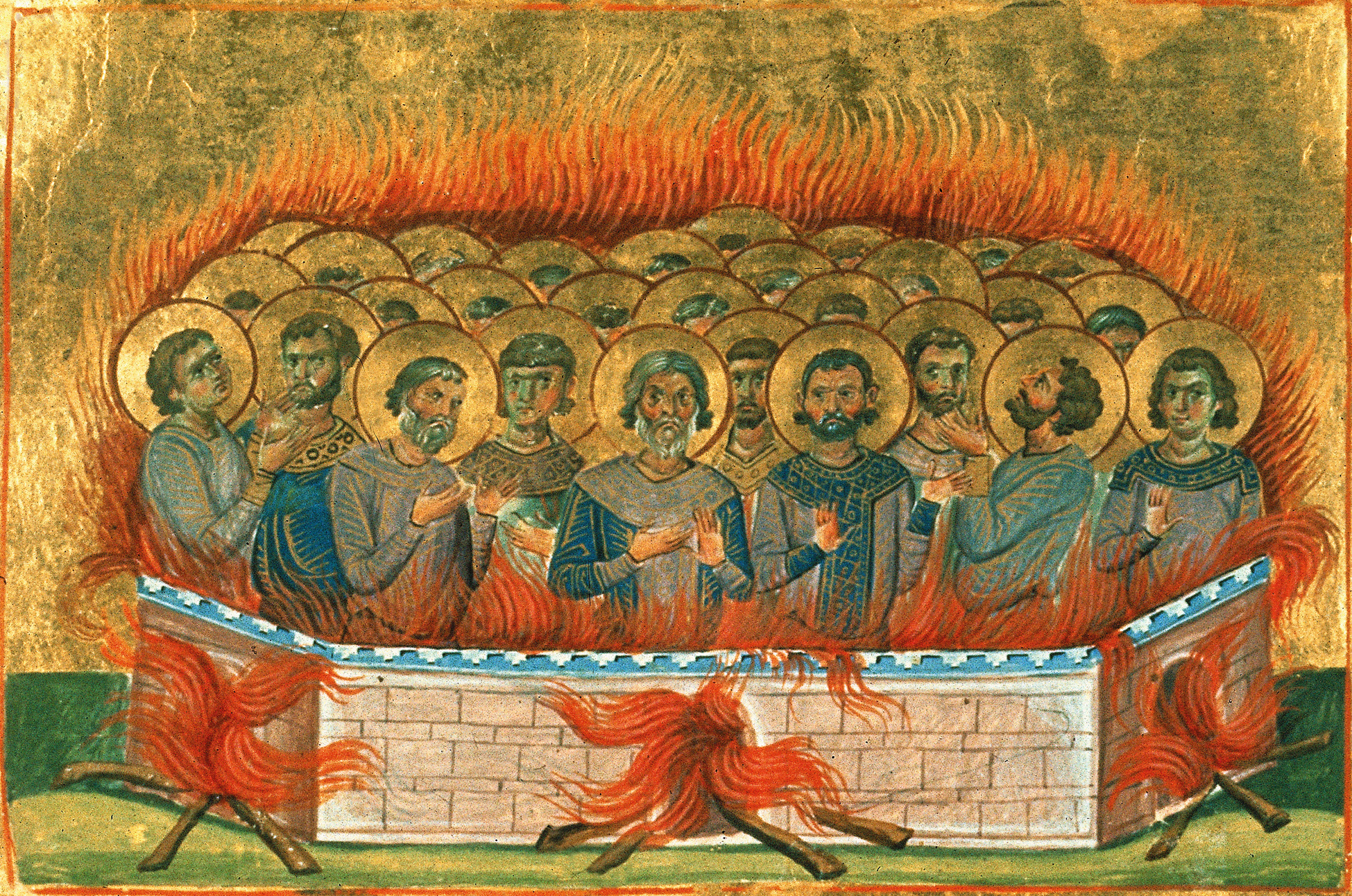
Martyrs Agapius, Atticus, Carterius, Styriacus (Styrax, Istucarius), Tobias (Pactobius), Eudoxius, Nictopolion, and Companions.
(Menologion of Basil II, 10th century).

Martyrs Acindynus, Pegasius, Aphthonius, Elpidephorus, Anempodistus, and 7,000 with them, of Persia.
(Menologion of Basil II, 10th century).

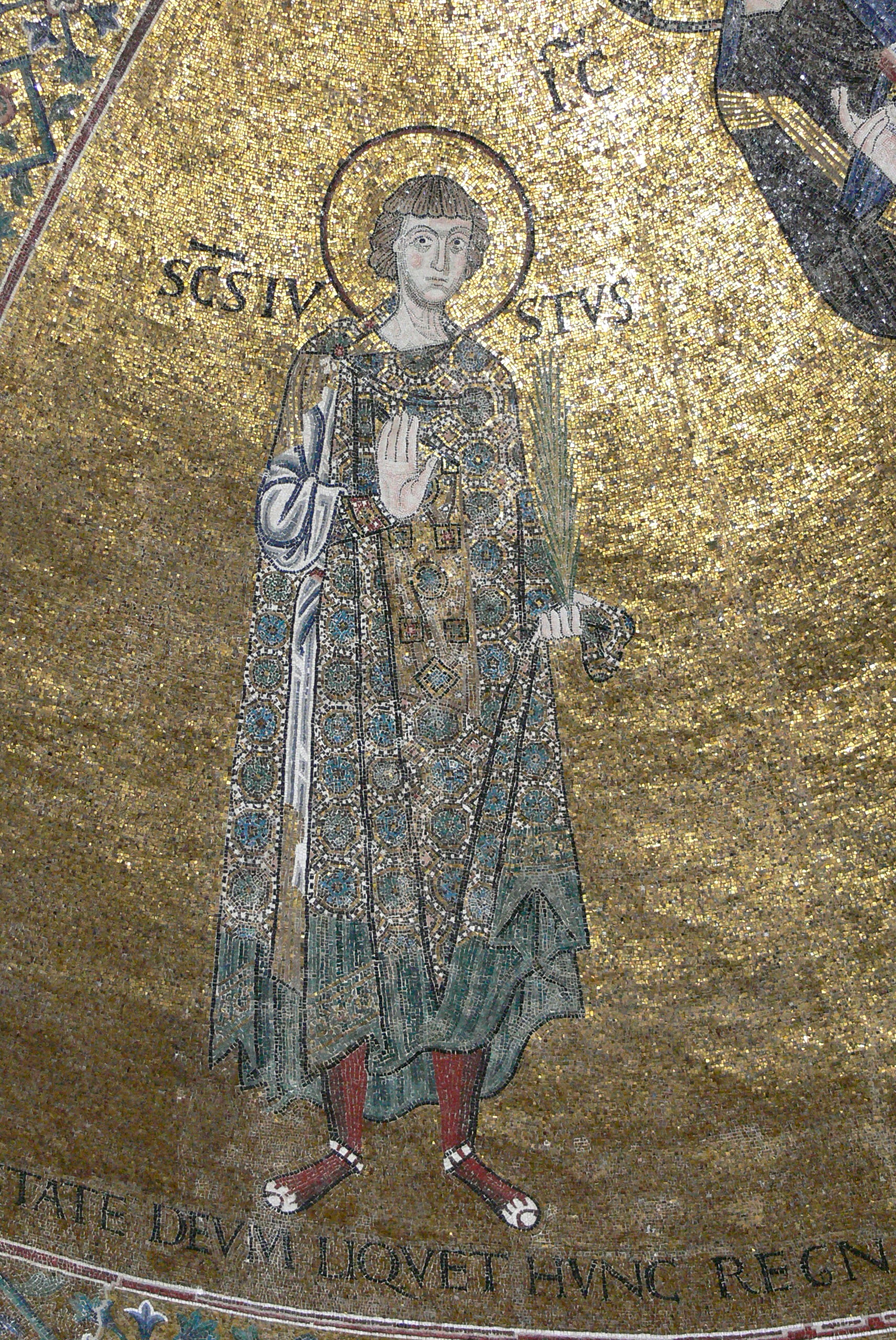
Apse mosaic of St. Justus of Trieste, (13th century).

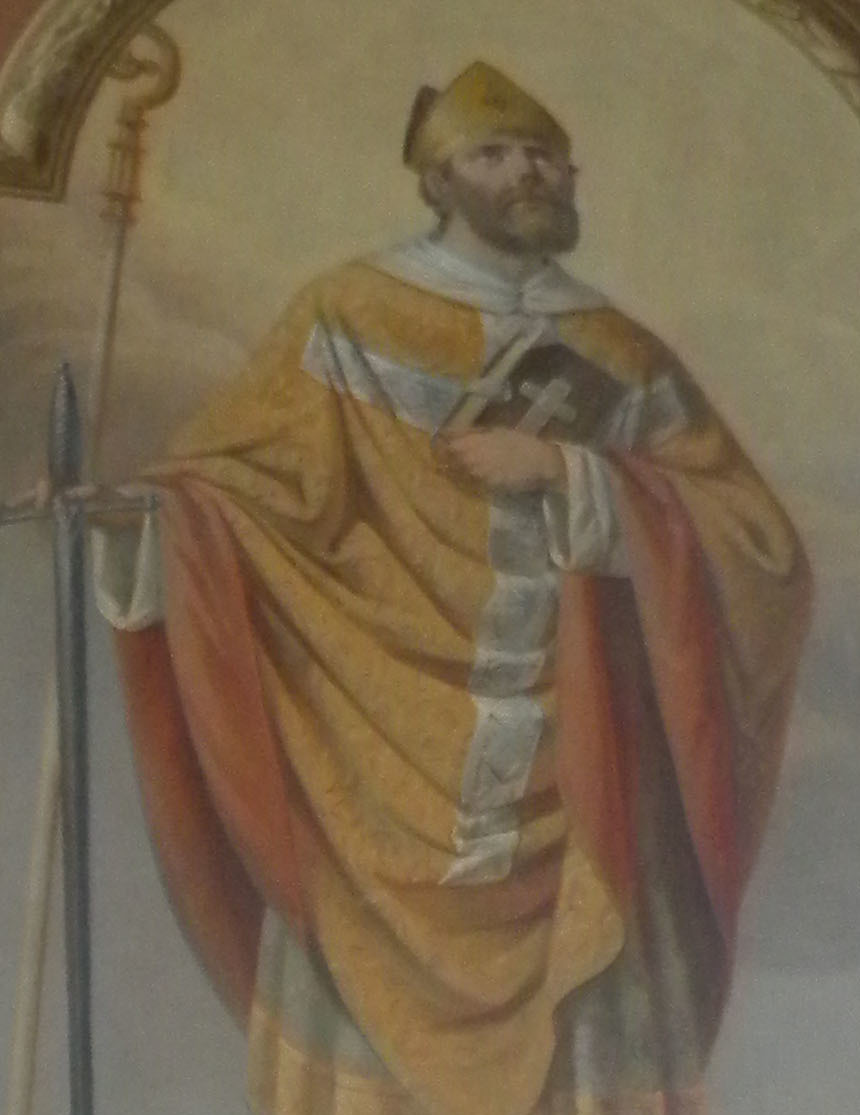
St. Victorinus of Pettau. Church in Nova Cerkev (Slovenia).

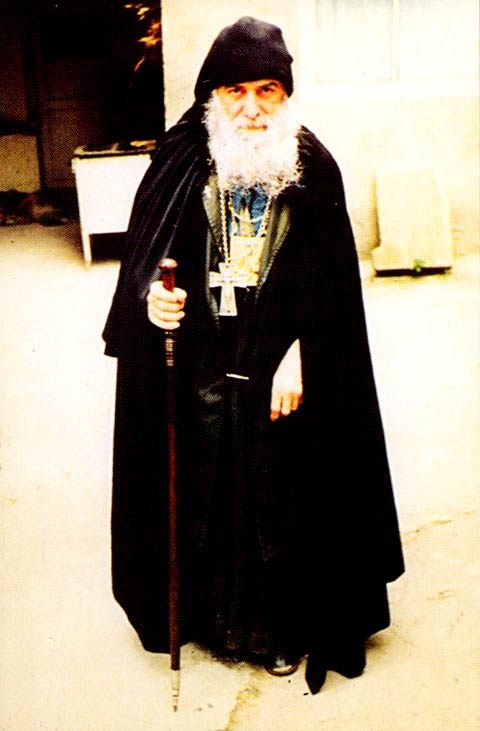
Saint Gabriel (Urgebadze), Confessor and Fool-for-Christ.

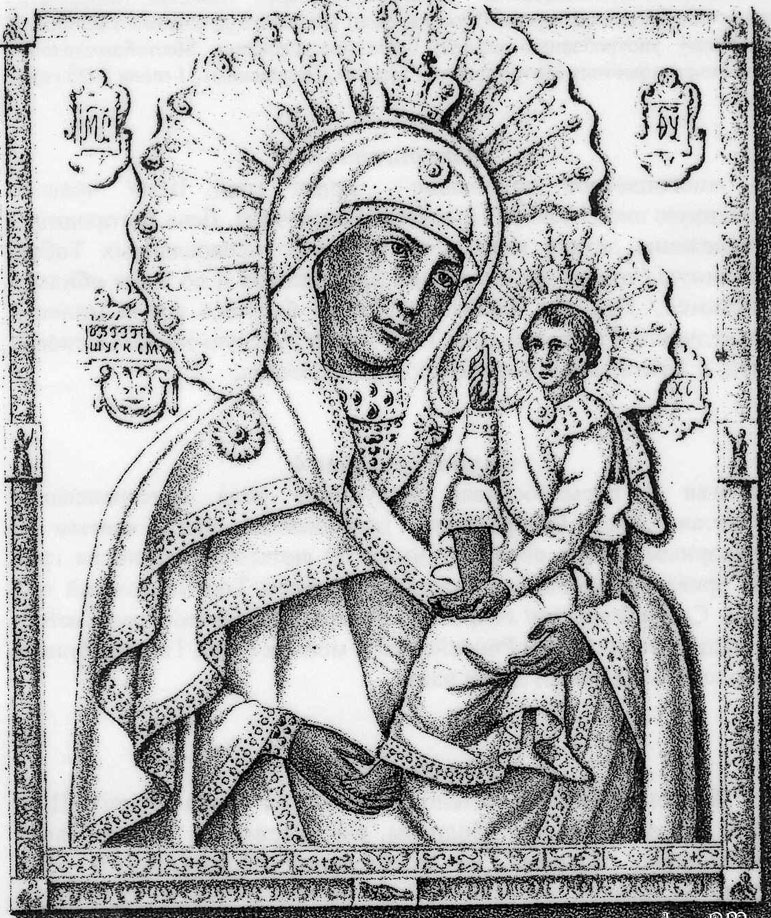
Lithograph of the Shuya-Smolensk icon of the Mother of God.

== Sources ==
- November 2/15. Orthodox Calendar (PRAVOSLAVIE.RU).
- November 15 / November 2. HOLY TRINITY RUSSIAN ORTHODOX CHURCH (A parish of the Patriarchate of Moscow).
- November 2. OCA - The Lives of the Saints.
- November 2. Latin Saints of the Orthodox Patriarchate of Rome.
- The Roman Martyrology. Transl. by the Archbishop of Baltimore. Last Edition, According to the Copy Printed at Rome in 1914. Revised Edition, with the Imprimatur of His Eminence Cardinal Gibbons. Baltimore: John Murphy Company, 1916. pp. 338–339.
- Rev. Richard Stanton. A Menology of England and Wales, or, Brief Memorials of the Ancient British and English Saints Arranged According to the Calendar, Together with the Martyrs of the 16th and 17th Centuries. London: Burns & Oates, 1892. pp. 521–522.

Greek Sources

- Great Synaxaristes: (in Greek) 2 ΝΟΕΜΒΡΙΟΥ. ΜΕΓΑΣ ΣΥΝΑΞΑΡΙΣΤΗΣ.
- (in Greek) Συναξαριστής. 2 Νοεμβρίου. ECCLESIA.GR. (H ΕΚΚΛΗΣΙΑ ΤΗΣ ΕΛΛΑΔΟΣ).

Russian Sources

- (in Russian) 15 ноября (2 ноября). Православная Энциклопедия под редакцией Патриарха Московского и всея Руси Кирилла (электронная версия). (Orthodox Encyclopedia - Pravenc.ru).
- (in Russian) 2 ноября (ст.ст.) 15 ноября 2013 (нов. ст.). Русская Православная Церковь Отдел внешних церковных связей. (DECR).
