= Estourmel =

- Commune
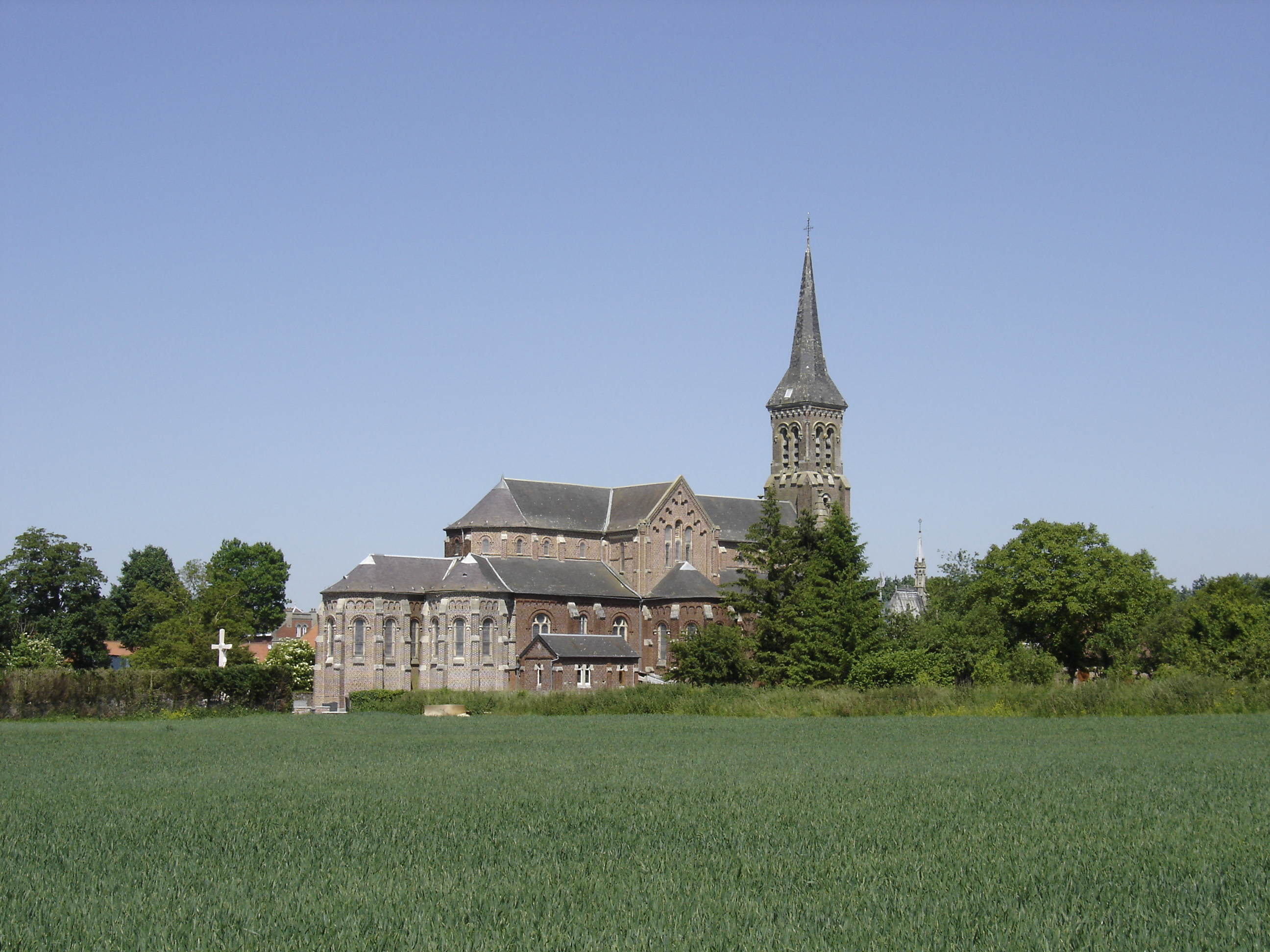
- Saint Vulgan Church in Estourmel

- Coat of arms
- Location of Estourmel
- Location within France Location within Hauts-de-France
- Coordinates: 50°08′49″N 3°19′14″E
- Country: France
- Region: Hauts-de-France
- Department: Nord
- Arrondissement: Cambrai
- Canton: Caudry
- Intercommunality: CA Caudrésis–Catésis

Government
  - Mayor (2020–2026): Bernard Plet
- Area^{1}: 5.45 km^{2} (2.10 sq mi)
- Highest elevation: 96 m (315 ft)
- Lowest elevation: 59 m (194 ft)
- Population (2023): 475
  - Density: 87.2/km^{2} (226/sq mi)
- Time zone: UTC+01:00 (CET)
  - Summer (DST): UTC+02:00 (CEST)
- INSEE/Postal code: 59213 /59400
- ^{1} French Land Register data, which excludes lakes, ponds, glaciers > 1 km^{2} (0.386 sq mi or 247 acres) and river estuaries.

Estourmel (French pronunciation: [ɛstuʁmɛl]) is a commune in the Nord department in northern France.

== Heraldry ==
Arms of Estourmel	The arms of Estourmel are blazoned : Gules, a cross indented argent. (Estourmel and Steenwerck use the same arms.)

== Places of interest ==
It used to be well known by the families of the Cambrai area for its petting zoo, Le Parc d'Estourmel, which opened in 1967 and closed in 2013; it was located in the center of the village. It covered 6 hectares.

== See also ==
- Communes of the Nord department
