= Dębina, Podkarpackie Voivodeship =

Dębina
- Village
- Location within Poland
- Coordinates: 50°6′N 22°18′E
- Country: Poland
- Voivodeship: Subcarpathian
- County: Łańcut
- Gmina: Białobrzegi

Dębina [dɛmˈbina] is a village located in the administrative district of Gmina Białobrzegi, within Łańcut County, in the Subcarpathian Voivodeship of south-eastern Poland.
