= Korniaktów Południowy =

- Village
- Location within Poland
- Coordinates: 50°06′00″N 22°22′27″E
- Country: Poland
- Voivodeship: Podkarpackie
- County: Łańcut
- Gmina: Białobrzegi
- Population (approx.): 500

Korniaktów Południowy [kɔrˈɲaktuf pɔwudˈɲɔvɨ] is a village in the administrative district of Gmina Białobrzegi, within Łańcut County, Podkarpackie Voivodeship, in south-eastern Poland.
