= Saint Vulgan Church =

Church located in Estourmel, France

- Église Saint-Vulgan d'Estourmel
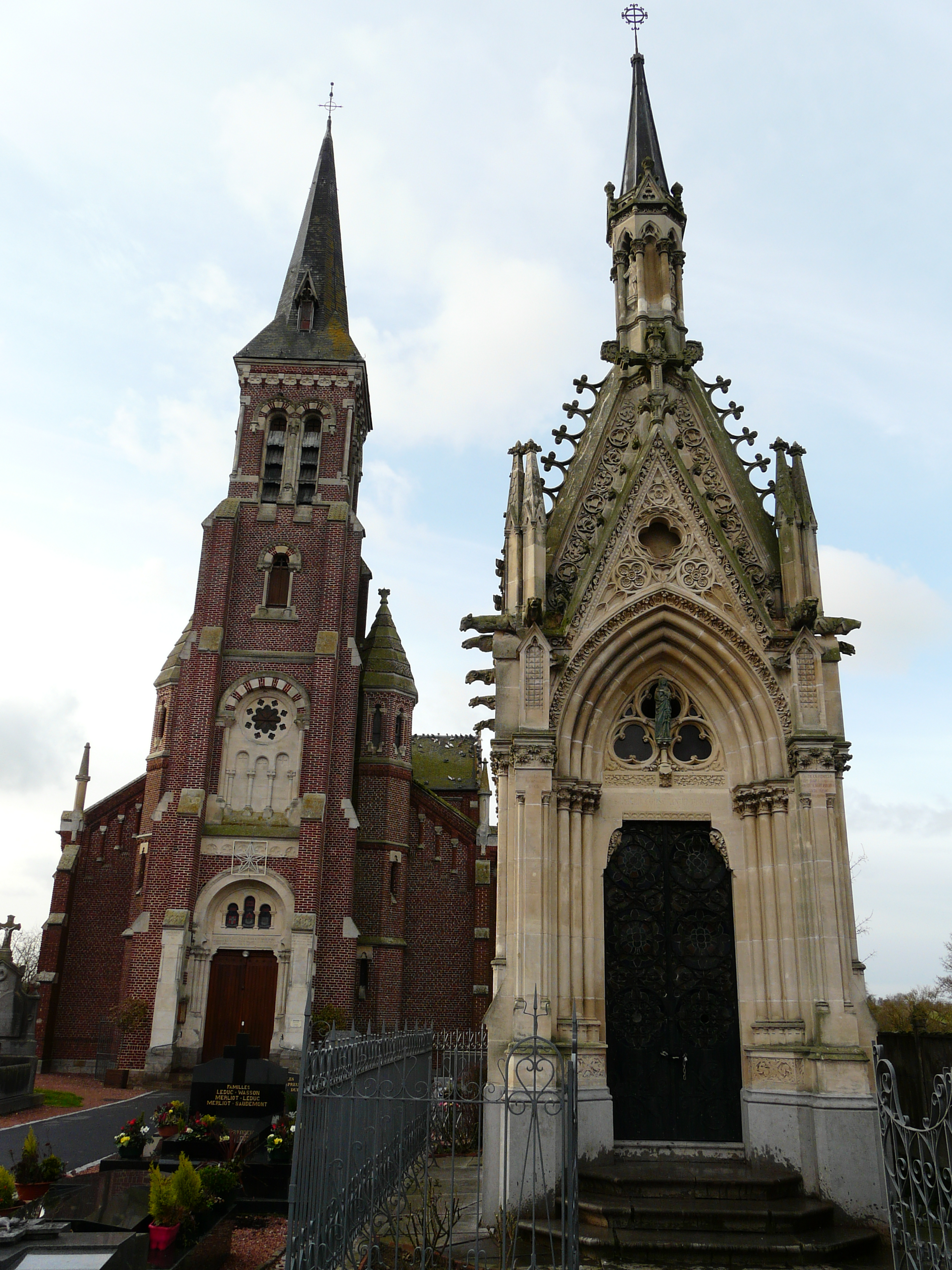
- Saint-Vulgan Church and Bricout Chapel

- Location in France

Religion
- Affiliation: Archdiocese of Cambrai
- Sect: Catholic Church
- Dedicated to: Saint Vulgan

Location
- Location: Parish of Saint-Joseph-en-Cambrésis
- Municipality: Estourmel, Nord department
- Country: France
- Interactive map of Saint Vulgan Church
- Coordinates: 50.1443°N 3.3194°E

Architecture
- Style: Romanesque Revival
- Completed: 1866
- Spire height: 41 metres (135 ft)

Saint-Vulgan Church is a Catholic church inf the village of Estourmel, Nord department, Hauts-de-France region of France. It is in the Archdiocese of Cambrai and the rural parish of Saint-Joseph en Cambrésis. The church is dedicated to Saint Vulgan, an English hermit of the 7th century, evangelizer of the surroundings of Boulogne and Thérouanne, and patron of Lens.

== History ==
The medieval church was demolished under the Second French Empire because it was considered too small and dilapidated. A new, larger church was built in 1866 in Romanesque Revival architecture. It was funded by donations from the Bricout family, whose funeral chapel (listed as a historical monument in 1990) is located just at the entrance to the cemetery to the right of the alley leading to the church.

== Description ==
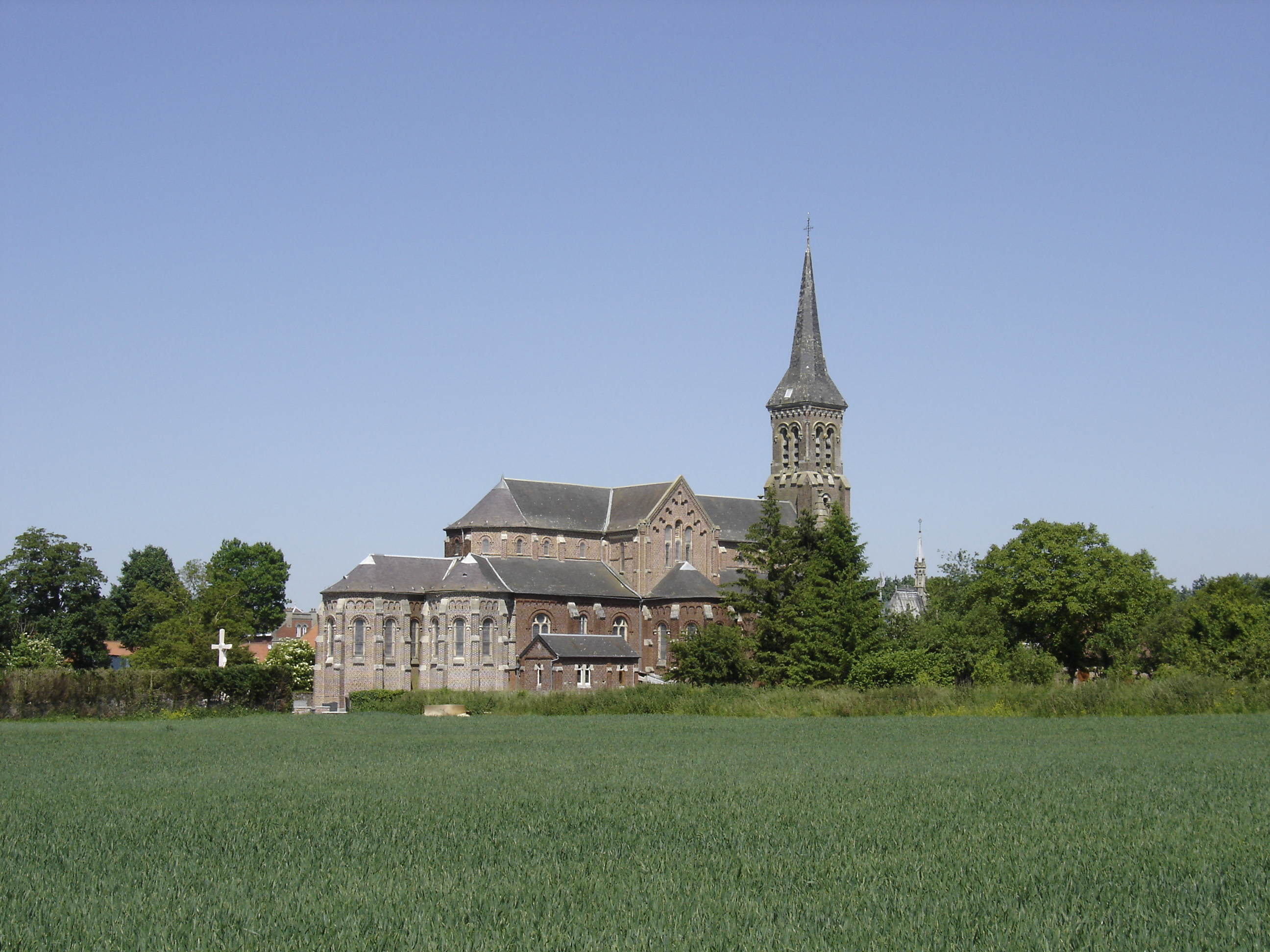
View of the church

The brick church, with a Latin cross plan and limestone corbels, is pierced with twin windows and overlooked by a high steeple-porch 41 metres (135 ft) high, flanked by hexagonal turrets. Its neo-Romanesque vaults feature elegant arcades. The portal, the tympanum and the small columns are in Creil stone. Its spire is covered with slate and crowned with a cross on which is perched the cock of Saint Peter.

The interior is remarkable with its wide arcades and double arches. It houses the recumbent figures of the Marquis d'Estourmel. Gilles-Rembold Creton d'Estourmel, governor of Saint-Quentin died in 1522. His son Jean had a tomb erected for him, surmounted by his recumbent figure, as well as that of his wife Élayne de Noyelles, who died in 1518. Gilles d'Estourmel is in arms, a gauntlet by his side and a lion at his feet. His wife has her feet on a sighthound. Their heads are separated by a shield bearing a cross. During the French Revolution the tomb was hidden by the Marquis Louis d'Estourmel. It was offered by his daughter to the town.

== Gallery ==
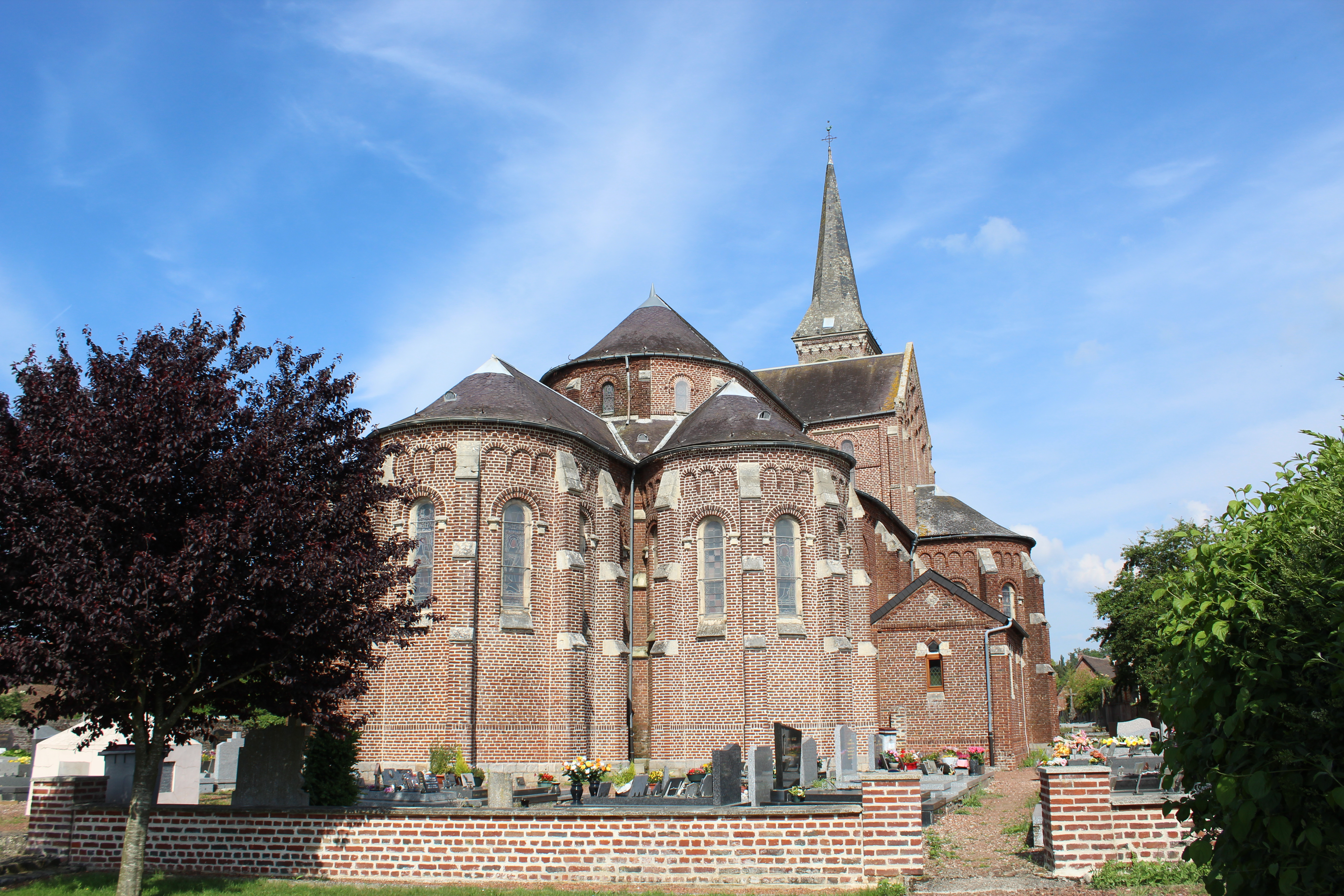
Church from the cemetery

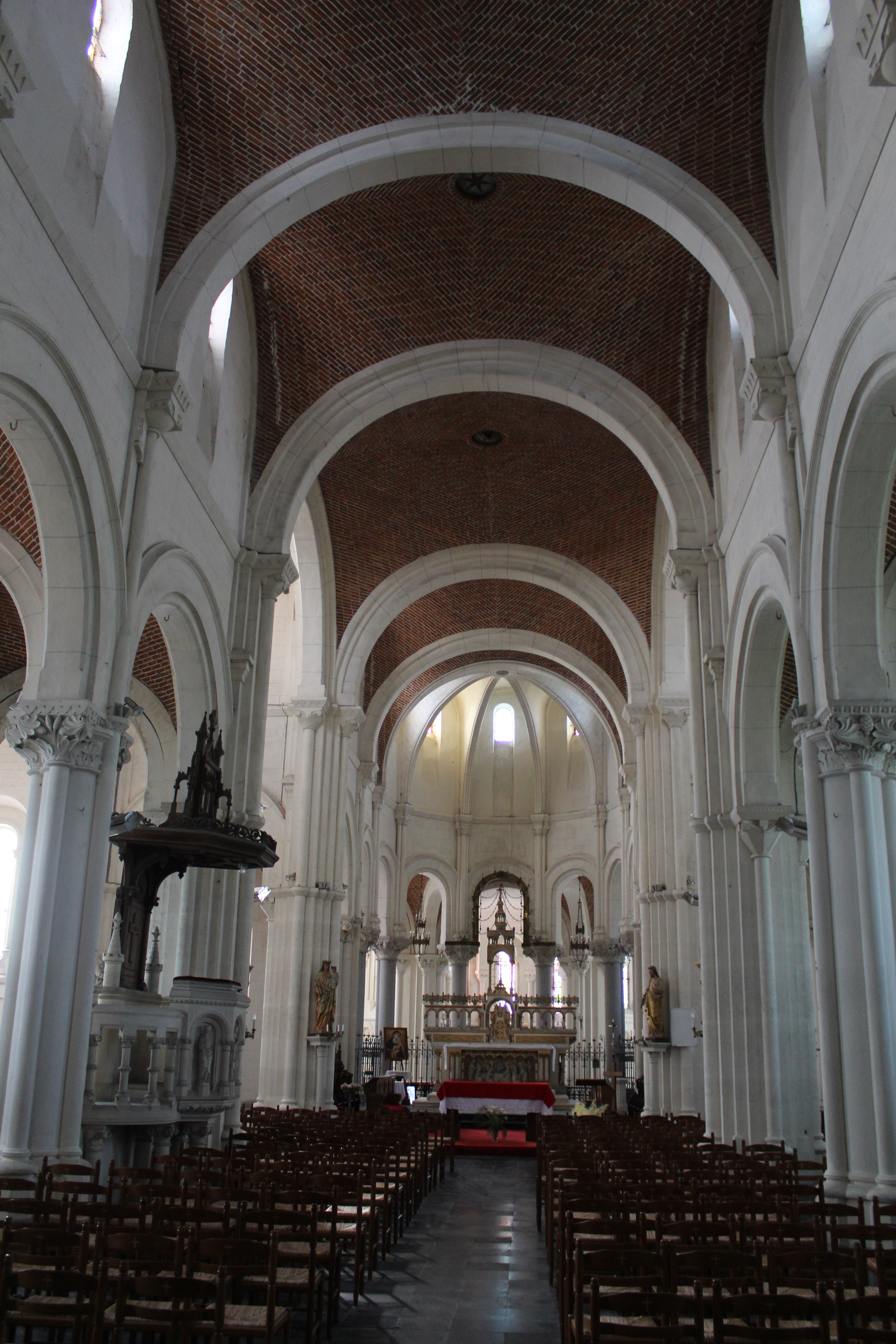
Nave

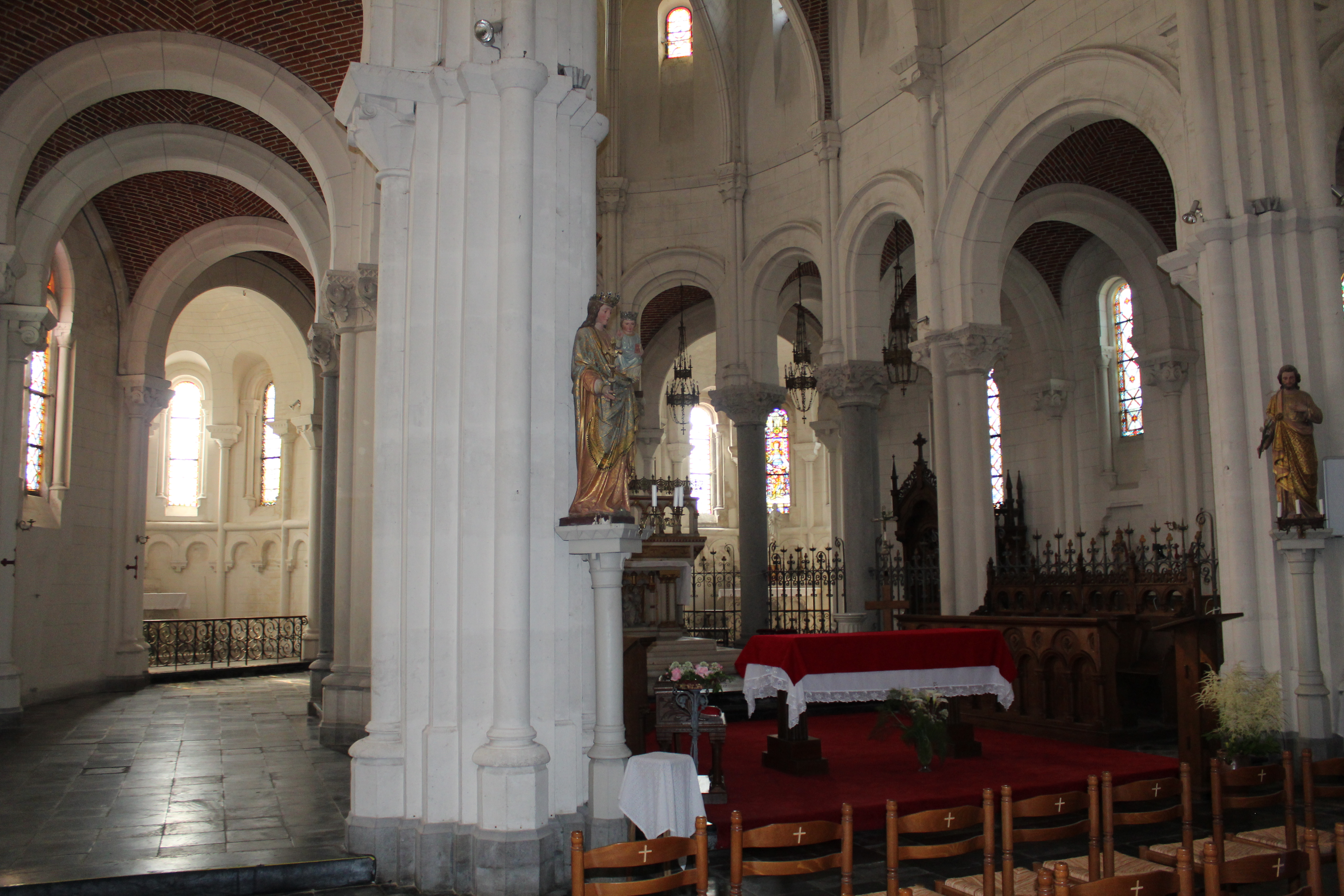
Aisle

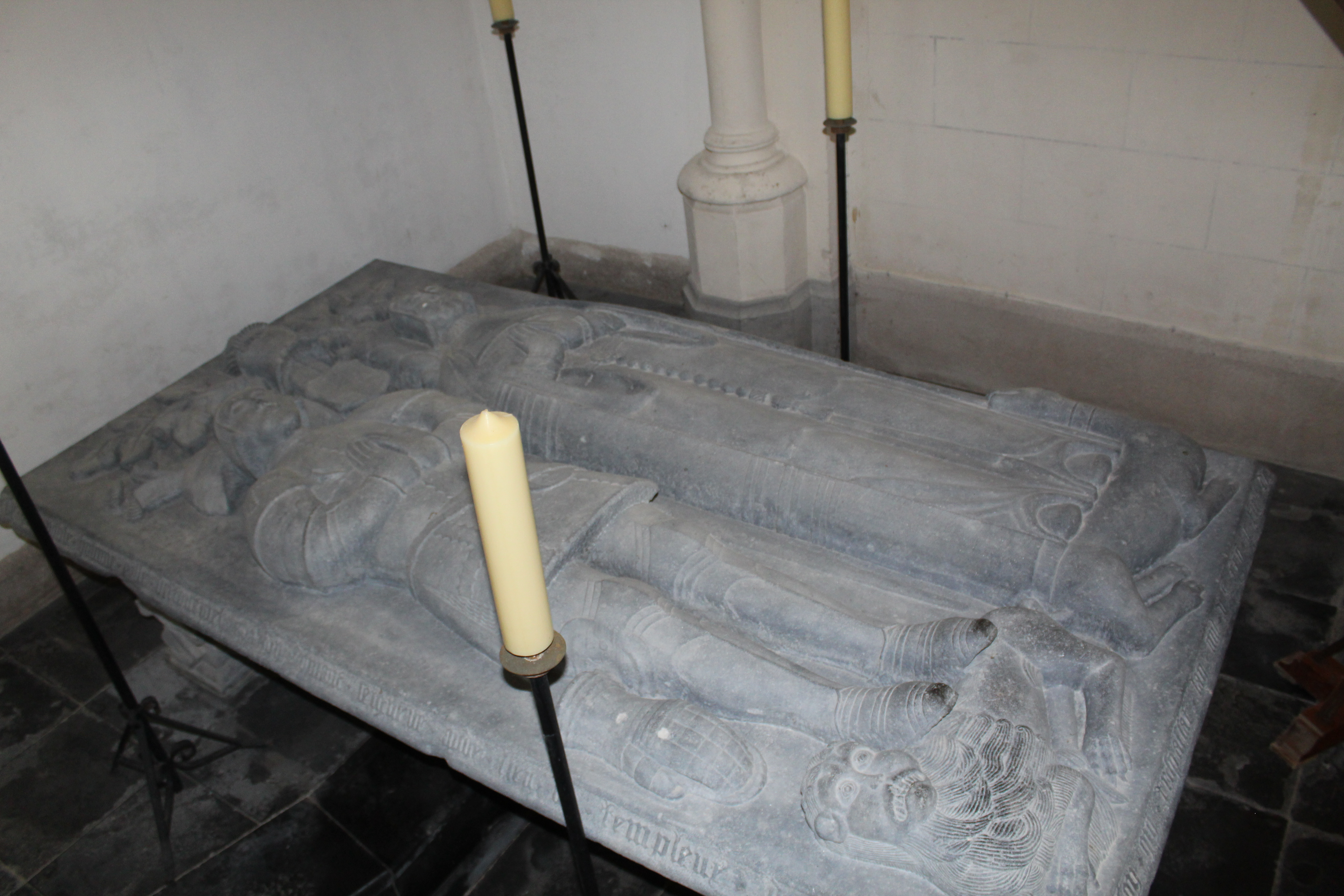
Recumbents

== Sources ==
- Église Saint-Vulgan (in French), Saint-Joseph en Cambrésis parish
- Eglise Saint-Vulgan d'Estourmel (in French), Office de Tourisme du Cambrésis
- Gisants des Marquis d'Estourmel (in French), Office de Tourisme du Cambrésis
- "Saint Vulgan", Nominis (in French)
