= Gmina Białobrzegi, Podkarpackie Voivodeship =

Gmina Białobrzegi Białobrzegi Commune
- Gmina
- Coat of arms
- Interactive map of Gmina Białobrzegi
- Coordinates (Białobrzegi): 50°6′5″N 22°19′25″E
- Country: Poland
- Voivodeship: Subcarpathian
- County: Łańcut
- Seat: Białobrzegi

Area
  - Total: 56.13 km^{2} (21.67 sq mi)

Population (2011)
  - Total: 8,374
  - Density: 149.2/km^{2} (386.4/sq mi)
- Website: http://www.gmina-bialobrzegi.pl/

Gmina Białobrzegi is a rural gmina (administrative district) in Łańcut County, Subcarpathian Voivodeship, in south-eastern Poland. Its seat is the village of Białobrzegi, which lies approximately 8 kilometres (5 mi) north-east of Łańcut and 24 km (15 mi) east of the regional capital Rzeszów.

The gmina covers an area of 56.13 square kilometres (21.7 sq mi), and as of 2006 its total population is 8,078 (8,374 in 2011).

== Villages ==
Gmina Białobrzegi contains the villages and settlements of Białobrzegi, Budy Łańcuckie, Dębina, Korniaktów Północny, Korniaktów Południowy and Wola Dalsza.

== Neighbouring gminas ==
Gmina Białobrzegi is bordered by the gminas of Czarna, Grodzisko Dolne, Łańcut, Przeworsk, Tryńcza and Żołynia.
