= Saint Vulgan =

Catholic and Orthodox saint

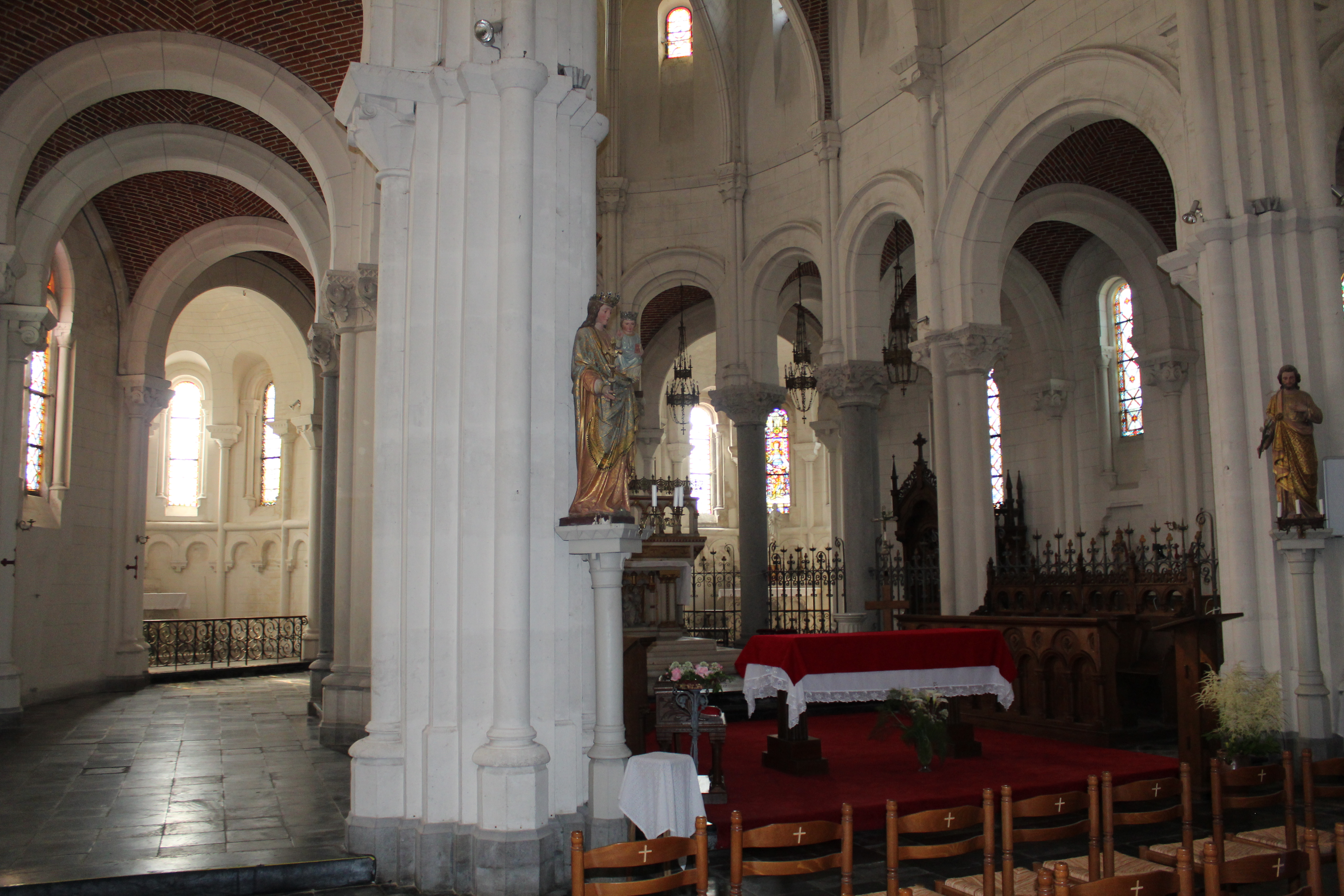
- Interior of the Église Saint-Vulgan d'Estourmel
- Born: 7th century England
- Died: 569 (?); Lens (?)
- Venerated in: Lens, Pas-de-Calais, Northern France
- Feast: 2 November

Saint Vulgan, or Wulgan, (died c. 569) was an English evangelizer and hermit of the 7th century who is considered a saint by the Catholic and Orthodox churches. Very little is known of his life, and he may have not existed.

== Life ==
Saint Wulgan, Archbishop of Canterbury, was a 7th century English evangelizer. He crossed the English Channel and landed in the region of Wissant. He evangelized the surroundings of Boulogne and Thérouanne. He then became a hermit at the Abbey of Saint-Vaast. He was said to be buried at Lens, Pas-de-Calais, of which he became the patron saint.

Saint Vulgan is said to have died at Lens in 569, but this date is uncertain, and the saint may not have existed. In 1041–1043 when the Gala episcoporum cameracenslum was being written it was claimed that his remains were in Lens, but this may only have been an attempt by the canons to prove the age of chapter.

== Legacy ==
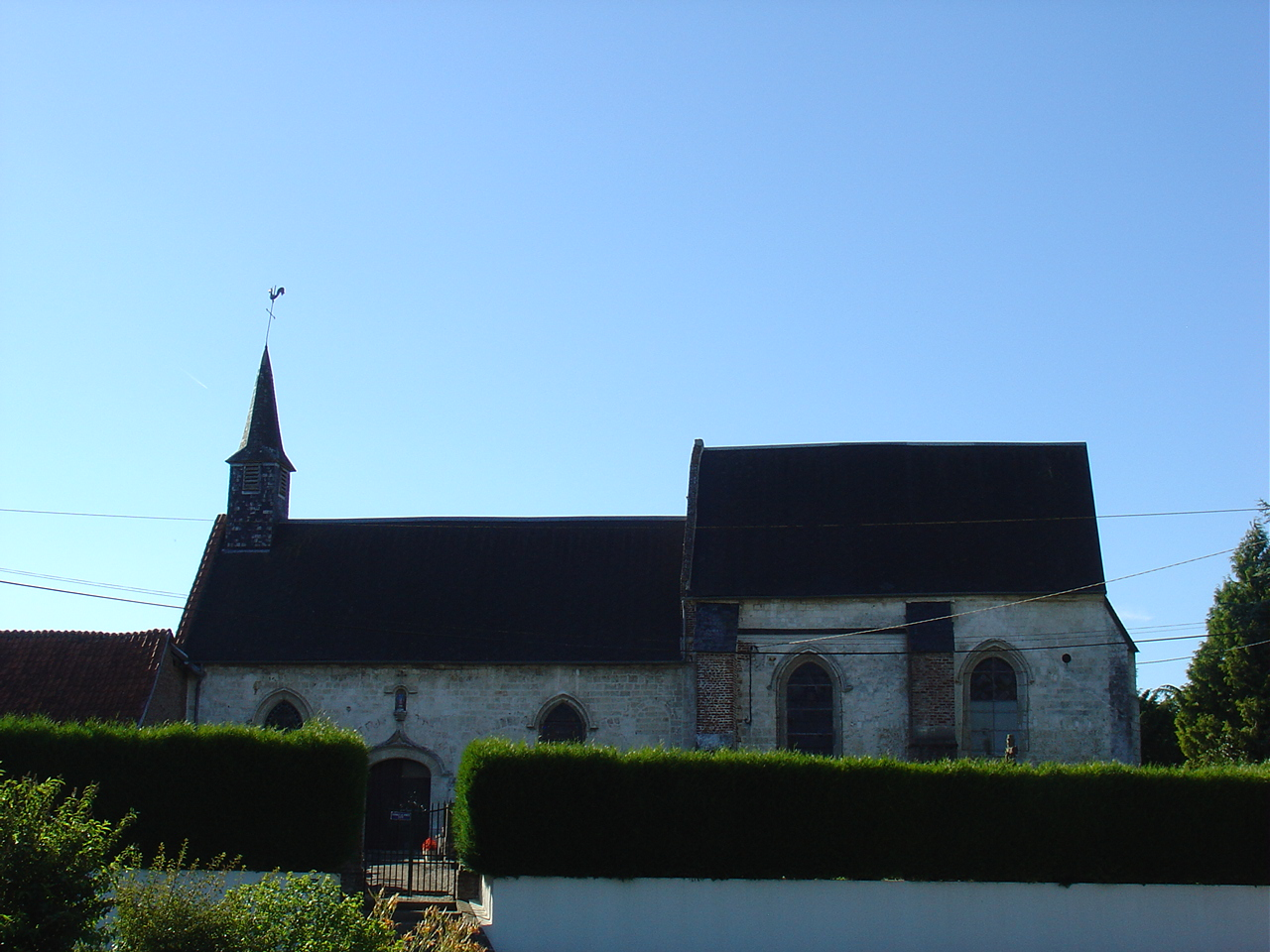
Église Saint-Vulgan de Framecourt

Saint Vulgan is celebrated locally on 2 November.

The 12th century Black Book of Saint-Ouen Abbey, Rouen, preserves the memory of Saint Vulgan in the form of a Life written under the Abbot Nicolas of Normandy (1042–1092). Information collected in the 17th century in Saint-Ouen Abbey, which may not be reliable, includes a very short account of the translation of the relics from Lens to the castle of La Ferté at the request of Robert I, Duke of Normandy (died 1035).

A collegiate church dedicated to Saint Vulgan was founded in 1028 by Eustace I, Count of Boulogne, the Lord of Lens. It was destroyed during the French Revolution. The treasury of the collegiate church held a part of the true Cross sent from Syria by Godfrey of Bouillon, the body of Saint Vulgan, a large part of the body of Saint Chrysole, part of the head of Saint Lambert and two bones of Saint Willibrord. These venerated remains, locked in reliquaries and caskets of great value, were exhibited with many other relics to the homage of the faithful who came to venerate them from afar.

The Église Saint-Vulgan in the priory of Framecourt is a very small building, of which a keystone bears the date 1685.

The Église Saint-Vulgan d'Estourmel of the Archdiocese of Cambrai in northern France is dedicated to the saint. The former church was destroyed in 1866 and replaced by the present building in 1866. The building is pierced by twin windows, is adorned with Romanesque arcades and has a tower 41 m (135 ft) high. Above the portal the small columns, the tympanum and the arch are in Creil stone. Inside, the barrel vaults are separated by double arches.

The city and the Chapter of Lens chose Saint Wulgan for their tutelary patron. The town of Lens was largely destroyed during World War I (1914-1918). After the war the Société des Mines de Lens built a chapel dedicated to Saint-Wulgan in the city of Grand-Condé, inaugurated on 1 November 1921. It was demolished in March 1959 and replaced by a new church inaugurated in March 1962, the Église catholique Notre-Dame-des-Mines-et-Saint-Wulgan. Saint Wulgan's statue stands alongside that of Our Lady of Mines in the church.

== Sources ==
- Commission départementale des monuments historiques (1908), Épigraphie du département de Pas-de-Calais (in French)
- Deramecourt, Augustin Victor (bishop of Soissons) (1884), Le clergé du diocèse d'Arras, Boulogne & Saint-Omer pendant la Révolution, 1789-1802 (in French), vol. 1
- Eglise Saint-Vulgan d'Estourmel (in French), Office de tourisme du Cambrésis
- Feuchère, P. (1952), "Les origines urbaines de Lens-en-Artois", Revue belge de Philologie et d'Histoire (in French) (30–1–2): 91–108
- Henriques, Laura (10 November 2020), "A weekend in Lens and its surroundings", Culture & Adventure, KAUSA Communication & Design
- Mériaux, Charles (2006), Gallia irradiata: saints et sanctuaires dans le nord de la Gaule du haut Moyen Âge (in French), Franz Steiner Verlag, ISBN 978-3-515-08353-9
- Montaubin, Pascal (2019), Saint-Vulgan - Base des collégiales séculières de France (816-1563) (in French), S2CID 203421608
- Petit, Anne; Desprez, Jean Claude (13 February 2020), "L'histoire peu ordinaire de l'église Notre-Dame des Mines de Lens", Le lensois normand (in French)
- "Saint Vulgan", Nominis (in French)
- Saints du Pas-de-Calais (in French), Diocèse d'Arras
