= Białobrzegi, Podkarpackie Voivodeship =

Białobrzegi
- Village
- Location within Poland
- Coordinates: 50°6′5″N 22°19′25″E
- Country: Poland
- Voivodeship: Subcarpathian
- County: Łańcut
- Gmina: Białobrzegi
- Population: 2,200

Białobrzegi [bjawɔˈbʐɛɡi] is a village in Łańcut County, Subcarpathian Voivodeship, in south-eastern Poland. It is the seat of the gmina (administrative district) called Gmina Białobrzegi.
