= Agapius, Atticus, Carterius, Styriacus, Tobias, Eudoxius, Nictopolion and companions =

Christian martyrs burned at the stake

Saints Agapius, Atticus, Carterius, Styriacus, Tobias, Eudoxius, Nictopolion, and Companions
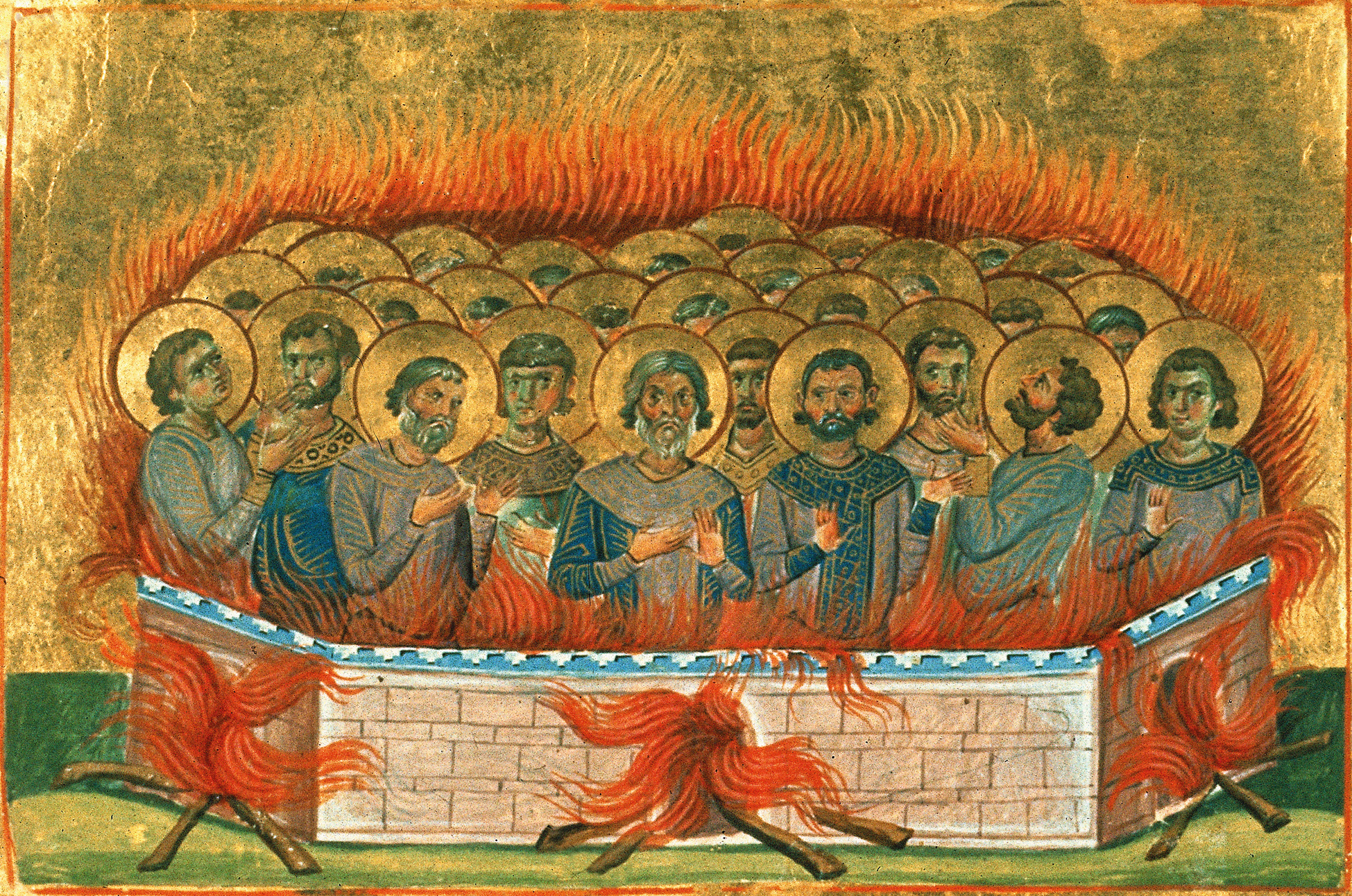
- Image from the Menologion of Basil II.

Martyrs
- Died: 315 AD; Sebaste (Sivas), Armenia
- Venerated in: Roman Catholic Church; Eastern Orthodox Church
- Feast: November 2

Agapius, Atticus, Carterius, Styriacus (Styrax, Istucarius), Tobias (Pactobius), Eudoxius, Nictopolion, and Companions are venerated as Christian martyrs.

They were soldiers who were burned at the stake at Sebaste in 315 AD, during the reign of Emperor Licinius.

These martyrs are honored during the liturgical year (Book of Menaion) on March 15 as the Commemoration of the Holy Martyrs Agapius and his Seven Companions. There it is stated that Agapius and his seven companions were beheaded on March 24, 304.
