= Erlan Nysanbaev =

Kazakh politician

- Ерлан Нысанбаев
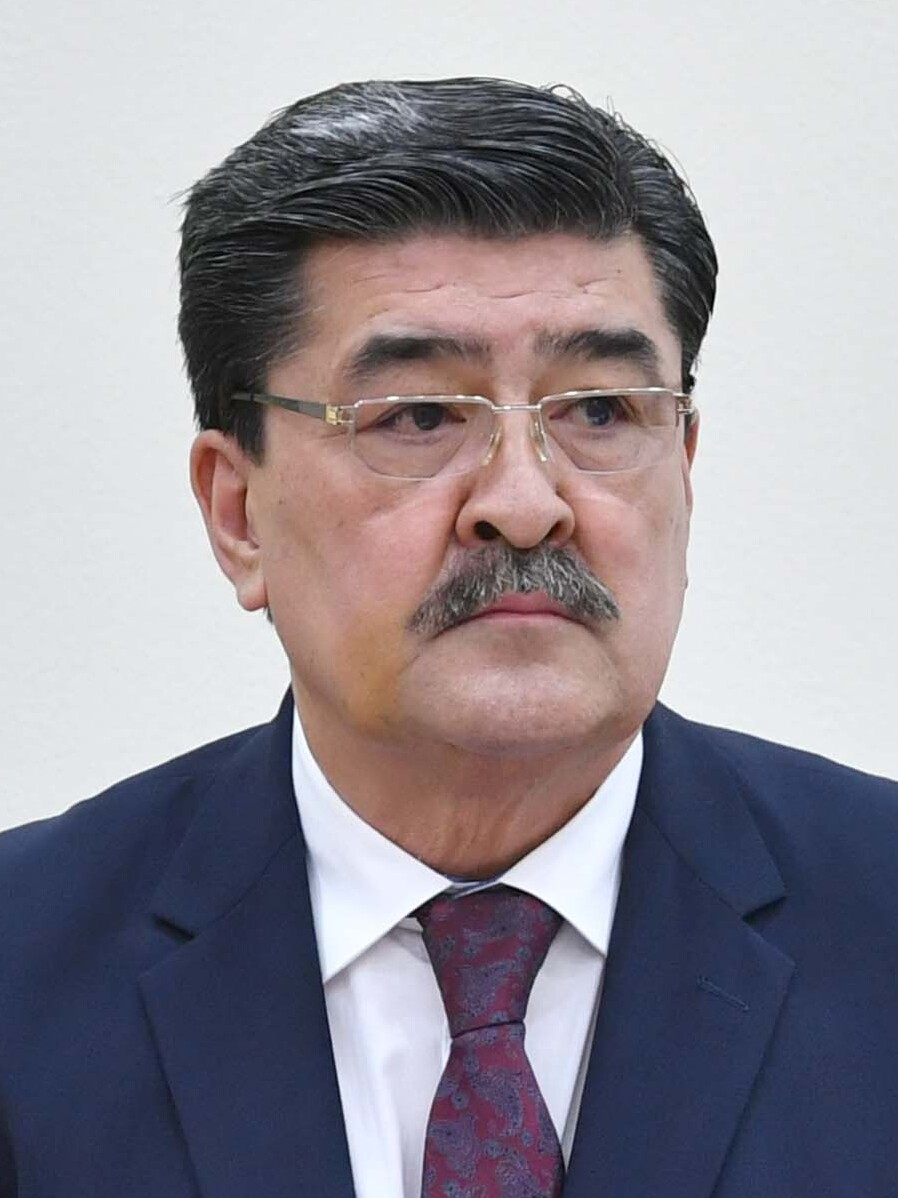
- Nysanbaev in 2024

Minister of Ecology and Natural Resources
- In office 5 September 2023 – 3 September 2026
- President: Kassym-Jomart Tokayev
- Prime Minister: Älihan Smaiylov; Roman Sklyar (acting); Oljas Bektenov
- Preceded by: Zülfia Süleimenova
- Succeeded by: Älibek Quantyrov

Member of the Astana City Mäslihat
- In office September 2007 – July 2009
- Preceded by: ?
- Succeeded by: Ermek Ospanov
- Constituency: No. 25

Personal details
- Born: 11 August 1961 (age 65) Podgornoye, Kazakh SSR, Soviet Union
- Party: Ädilet (2004–present)
- Spouse: Leila Tolegenova
- Children: 3
- Education: Kazakh Agricultural Institute; Abai Kazakh National Pedagogical University
- Awards: Order of Kurmet; Medal for Distinguished Labor; Medal "10 years of Astana"

Erlan Nūralyūly Nysanbaev (Note: Often transliterated as Ерлан Нуралиевич Нысанбаев through a Russified Romanization of Yerlan Nuraliyevich Nyssanbayev.) (Kazakh: Ерлан Нұралыұлы Нысанбаев; (Note: Alternate spellings include Nūrälıūly (Нұрәліұлы) and Nūrälıūly (Нұрәлиұлы)) born 11 August 1961) is a Kazakh politician and agrarian who is serving as the freelance advisor to PM Oljas Bektenov since 2026. Previously, he was the Minister of Ecology and Natural Resources from 2023 to 2026.

== Biography ==
Nysanbaev was born in the village of Podgornoye, Uygur District, Almaty Region. He graduated from the Kazakh Agricultural Institute in 1983 with a degree in forestry engineering and later completed a bachelor's degree in finance at the Abai Kazakh National Pedagogical University in 2008. In 2010, he earned the degree of Candidate of Agricultural Sciences; his dissertation focused on ecological and forestry issues in the landscaping of the city of Astana.

Nysanbaev began his professional career in 1983 as a master at the Uyghur forestry enterprise. From 1984 to 1989, he worked in the Komsomol structures of the Uygur District, serving as an instructor and later as deputy head of the organizational department. Between 1989 and 1991, he held positions in the Alma-Ata Regional Committee of the Komsomol, including instructor and deputy head of a sector in the agricultural department.

From 1991 to 1994, he worked in the private sector as a chief specialist at KRAMDS-Agro and later as director of the foreign trade company Akzhol-IMPEX. He subsequently headed the peasant farm "Nysana" from 1994 to 1996 and led RPO Selkhozenergo from 1996 to 2000. In the early 2000s, he held managerial positions in municipal and private enterprises, including the Atyrau regional municipal enterprise Khozu, Leyer LLP, and ALEM MOTORS Autocenter.

From 2004 to 2009, Nysanbaev worked in the system of urban landscaping, serving as first deputy director and later director of the state enterprise Zelenstroy, and subsequently as general director of AstanaZelenstroy JSC.

From 2007 to 2009, he was the deputy of the Astana City Mäslihat from 2007 to 2009.

In July–August 2009, he briefly served as akim of the Tuzdy Rural District in the Bukhar-Zhyrau District of Karaganda Region.

In August 2009, he was appointed chairman of the Committee for Forestry and Hunting of the Ministry of Agriculture of Kazakhstan, a position he held until January 2013. From 1 February 2013, he served as Vice Minister of Environmental Protection, and from 13 August 2014 as Vice Minister of Agriculture. He later continued his work in environmental governance as Vice Minister of Ecology, Geology and Natural Resources from 26 July 2019 to 21 May 2021.

Between May 2021 and March 2023, Nysanbaev was deputy chairman of the Board for Strategic Development and International Relations at the Saken Seifullin Kazakh Agrotechnical University. From March to September 2023, he served as an advisor to the akim of Astana.

On 5 September 2023, following approval by the Mäjilis, Nysanbaev was appointed Minister of Ecology and Natural Resources of the Republic of Kazakhstan by decree of President Kassym-Jomart Tokayev. After the resignation of the government, he was reappointed to the post on 6 February 2024. On September 3, 2026, Nysanbaev stepped down along with the Bektenov government. Shortly thereafter, on September 15, he was appointed as an freelance advisor to Oljas Bektenov.

== Personal life ==
Nysanbaev is married and has three children. His wife, Leila Tolegenova (born 1963), has been engaged in business activities. Their children are Erdan Nuralin (born 1984), Anar Alikeeva (born 1985), and Raiymbek Nuralin (born 2003).

== Awards ==
- Order of Kurmet
- Medal for Distinguished Labor (2007)
- Medal "10 years of Astana" (2008)
