= Magzum Myrzagaliev =

Kazakh politician (born 1978)

Magzum Mirzagaliev
- Мағзұм Мырзағалиев
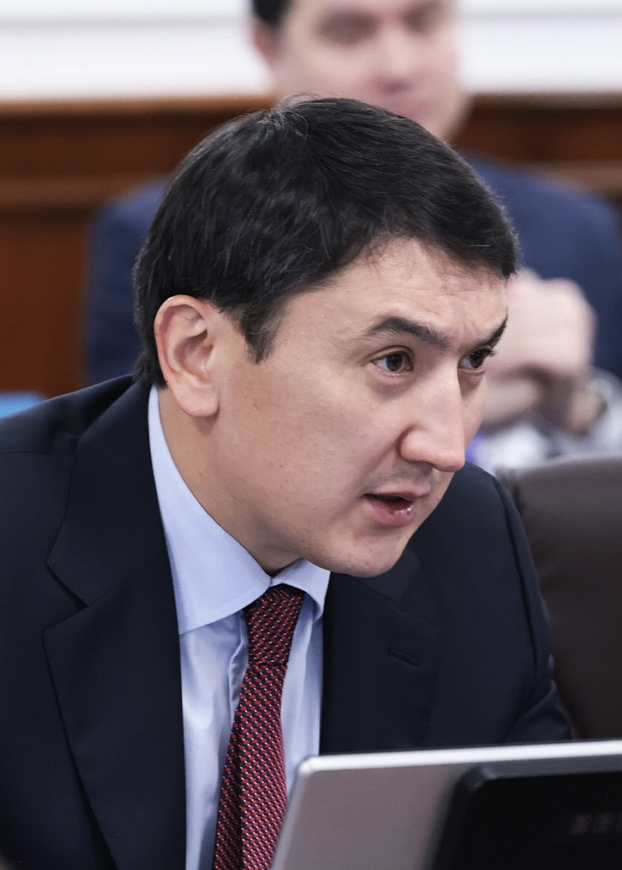
- Mirzagaliev in 2025

Aide to the president of Kazakhstan
- Incumbent
- Assumed office 13 February 2025
- President: Kassym-Jomart Tokayev
- Preceded by: Bolat Aqşolaqov
- In office 13 January 2022 – 14 April 2022
- President: Kassym-Jomart Tokayev

CEO of KazMunayGas
- In office 14 April 2022 – 14 May 2025
- Preceded by: Alik Aidarbaev
- Succeeded by: Ashat Hassenov

Minister of Energy
- In office 9 September 2021 – 11 January 2022
- President: Kassym-Jomart Tokayev
- Prime Minister: Askar Mamin
- Preceded by: Nurlan Nogaev
- Succeeded by: Bolat Aqşolaqov

Minister of Ecology, Geology and Natural Resources
- In office 17 June 2019 – 9 September 2021
- President: Kassym-Jomart Tokayev
- Prime Minister: Askar Mamin
- Preceded by: Nurlan Kapparov (Environment and Water Resources)
- Succeeded by: Serıkqali Brekeşev

Personal details
- Born: 7 November 1978 (age 47) Alma-Ata, Kazakh SSR, Soviet Union
- Spouse: Aiym Mirzagalieva
- Children: 5
- Education: Turan University; Diplomatic Academy of the Ministry of Foreign Affairs of the Republic of Kazakhstan; Caspian State University of Technologies and Engineering

Magzum Maratuly Mirzagaliev (Kazakh: Мағзұм Маратұлы Мырзағалиев, romanized: Mağzūm Maratūly Myrzağaliev; born 7 November 1978) is a Kazakh politician serving as aide to the president Kassym-Jomart Tokayev since 2025. Previously, he was a Minister of Energy from 2021 to 2022 and Minister of Ecology, Geology and Natural Resources from 2019 to 2021.

== Biography ==
=== Early life and education ===
Mirzagaliev was born in Alma-Ata (now Almaty). He studied at the Republican Physics-Mathematics State School and in 1999, Mirzagaliev graduated from the Turan University with a degree in international economics. In 2003, he graduated from the Diplomatic Academy of the Ministry of Foreign Affairs of the Republic of Kazakhstan with the same specialty as an international economist. In parallel with his studies at the Turan University, Mirzagaliev studied at the Caspian State University of Technologies and Engineering, specializing in "Development of oil and gas fields".

=== Career ===
Mirzagaliev began his work experience in 1997 as a manager at Zhartas LLP. From 2000 to 2001, he worked in the Forest and Biological Resources Management of the Akmola Region.

In 2001, he was hired as an engineer for drilling fluids MIDrillingFluids International (Schlumberger) at the Tengiz field. In 2002, Mirzagaliev was selected for the company's career development program from the Kazakh branch of Schlumberger, and was trained in the United States, Malaysia, in the fields of Western Siberia. After returning to Kazakhstan, he worked as a business development manager, then was appointed head of the MIDrillingFluids International branch in Kazakhstan.

From 2007 to 2010, Mirzagaliev worked as the general director of TenizService LLP of the National Company KazMunayGas. In 2010, he became a managing director of the company. From 2012 to 2013, Myrzagaliev served as a deputy chairman of the Board for Innovative Development and Service Projects of KazMunayGas.

On 24 October 2013, he was appointed to civil service as Vice Minister of Oil and Gas and from 13 August 2014, he served as Vice Minister of Energy. By the decree of the President of Kazakhstan Kassym-Jomart Tokayev, the Ministry of Ecology, Geology and Natural Resources was created with Mirzagaliyev being appointed to the post of a Minister in the new department on 17 June 2019. On 9 September 2021, he was transferred to the post of Minister of Energy, succeeding Nurlan Nogaev.

On April 14, 2022, he was appointed as a Chairman of the Board of JSC NC KazMunayGas.

On December 8, 2023 - Chairman of Kazakhstan Association of Oil, Gas and Energy Sector Organizations KAZENERGY.
