= Nurlan Kapparov =

Kazakh politician and businessman (1970–2015)

- Нұрлан Қапаров
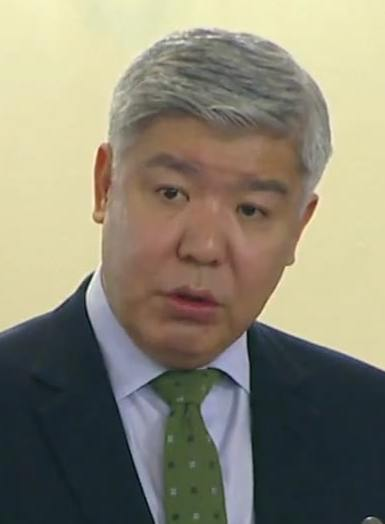
- Kapparov in 2013

Minister of Environment and Water
- In office 20 January 2012 – 6 August 2014
- President: Nursultan Nazarbayev
- Prime Minister: Karim Massimov; Serik Akhmetov
- Preceded by: Nurgali Ashimov (Environment)
- Succeeded by: Magzum Myrzagaliev (Ecology, Geology and Natural Resources)

Personal details
- Born: 30 March 1970 Alma-Ata, Kazakh SSR, Soviet Union
- Died: 26 March 2015 (aged 44) Beijing, China
- Spouse: Gauhar Kapparova
- Children: 2
- Education: Al-Farabi Kazakh National University; Harvard Kennedy School

Nurlan Djambululy Kapparov (Kazakh: Нұрлан Джамбулұлы Қаппаров, Nūrlan Djambulūly Qapparov; 30 March 1970 – 26 March 2015) was a Kazakh politician and businessman who served as a Minister of Environment Protection and Minister of Environment and Water from 20 January 2012 to 6 August 2014. Before his death, Kapparov was the chairman of the Board of Kazatomprom.

== Biography ==
=== Early life and education ===
Kapparov was born in the city of Alma-Ata (now Almaty). He graduated from the Republican Physics and Mathematics School. Until 7th grade, he studied in the Village School 120. From 1987 to 1991, Kapparov studied at the Al-Farabi Kazakh National University. In 2003, he earned a degree as engineer economist and masters in public administration from the Harvard Kennedy School.

=== Career ===
While studying, Kapparov served in the Soviet Army from 1987 to 1989. In 1991, Kapparov he founded the company Accept and from 1997 to 1999, he was the chief executive of the national company KazTransOil and oil and gas company Kazakhoil.

In 1999, Kapparov became a Vice Minister for Energy, Industry and Mineral Resources and in 2001, as Vice Minister of Energy and Mineral Resources.

On 20 January 2012, Kapparov was appointed as Minister of Environment Protection. After the Ministry was reorganized on 11 November 2013, he became the Minister of Environment and Water and served the post until it was abolished on 6 August 2014. Kapparov then became the chairman of the Board of Kazatomprom.

=== Death ===
Kapparov died unexpectedly on 26 March 2015 in Beijing from a heart attack.
