= Serıkqali Brekeşev =

Kazakh politician

- Серікқали Брекешев
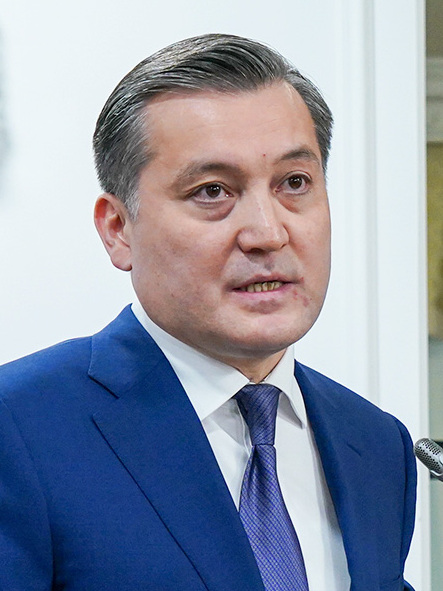
- Brekeşev in 2022

Minister of Ecology, Geology and Natural Resources
- In office 10 September 2021 – 14 March 2023
- President: Kassym-Jomart Tokayev
- Prime Minister: Askar Mamin; Älihan Smaiylov
- Preceded by: Magzum Myrzagaliev
- Succeeded by: Zülfia Süleimenova

Personal details
- Born: 14 October 1972 (age 53) Pavlodar, Pavlodar Region, Kazakh SSR, Soviet Union
- Education: Atyrau University of Oil and Gas

Serıkqali Amanğaliūly Brekeşev (Note: Often transliterated as Serikkali Amangaliyevich Brekeshev through a Russified Romanization of Сериккали Амангельдиевич Брекешев.) (Kazakh: Серікқали Аманғалиұлы Брекешев; born 14 October 1972) is a Kazakh politician who served as Minister of Ecology, Geology and Natural Resources from 2021 to 2023. Before this, he served as Vice Minister from March 2020. During his early stages of his career, Brekeşev held various jobs relating to oil engineering and management.

== Biography ==
=== Early life and career ===
Born in the city of Pavlodar, Kazakh Soviet Socialist Republic, Brekeşev studied at the Atyrau University of Oil and Gas where graduated in 1995 after majoring in the development of oil and gas fields.

After completing his studies, Brekeşev briefly worked as an economist and deputy general director of the Kazakhstan-Russia Trade House. In 1997, he was the inspector of the operational department of Aktau Tax Department before working as engineer at the Department of Transport of Special Equipment and Spare Parts and the 8th Category of Pipes and Metal Products of the branch for the Munaigermes Department of Material and Technical Support and Sales of Products at the Mangistaumunaigas JSC. From 1998, Brekeşev served as operations engineer, oil field foreman and field manager of the CJSC Karakudukmunai until 2006, when the following year in 2007, he began holding several senior positions in the Energy and Mineral Resources and Oil and Gas ministries. In 2015, Brekeşev worked for the KazTransGaz JSC, where he served as the director of the technical policy department, the managing director for the GTS management, technical policy, production and technical department, and the deputy general director for technical policy.

=== Political career ===
On 5 March 2020, by the government decree, Brekeşev was appointed as a Vice Minister of Ecology, Geology and Natural Resources, in which he oversaw the field of geology and international cooperation for the ministry.

In the aftermath of several cabinet shuffles, Brekeşev on 10 September 2021 by President Kassym-Jomart Tokayev was appointed as the Ecology, Geology and Natural Resources Minister after succeeding Magzum Myrzagaliev in his post. Following the appointment, Brekeşev, along with the entire ministry in accordance with Tokayev's policies, was tasked with effectively implementing the new Environmental Code, the preparation of a Low-Carbon Development Concept, and to increase the area of the forest fund, and further develop the water resources management system and fisheries.
