= Erlan Aqkenjenov =

Kazakh politician

- Ерлан Ақкенженов
- Aqkenjenov in 2026

Minister of Energy
- Incumbent
- Assumed office 19 March 2025
- President: Kassym-Jomart Tokayev
- Prime Minister: Oljas Bektenov
- Preceded by: Almasadam Sätqaliev

Personal details
- Born: 12 May 1979 (age 47) Alma-Ata, Kazakh SSR, Soviet Union
- Spouse: Dana Tüsipbekova
- Education: Adilet Law Academy; Astana International University; Gubkin Russian State University of Oil and Gas
- Awards: Order of Kurmet

Erlan Qūdaibergenūly Aqkenjenov (Note: Often transliterated as Yerlan Kudaibergenovich Akkenzhenov through a Russified Romanization of Ерлан Кудайбергенович Аккенженов.) (Kazakh: Ерлан Құдайбергенұлы Ақкенженов; born 12 May 1979) is a Kazakh politician who has served as the Minister of Energy of the Republic of Kazakhstan since 19 March 2025.

== Biography ==
Aqkenjenov was born in Alma-Ata (now Almaty) and graduated from the Adilet Law Academy with a degree in law, as well as from Astana International University with a specialization in the oil and gas business. In 2025, he completed professional retraining at the Gubkin Russian State University of Oil and Gas, earning a diploma of professional retraining under the Master of Business Administration program in Energy Business Management.

He began his professional career in 2002 as a chief specialist and chief manager at KazMunayGas Trading House LLP in Astana. From April to June 2004, he served as director of the Oil and Petroleum Products Export Department at the same company. Between 2004 and 2006, he worked as a crude oil trader at Chevron Texaco Global Trading in the United Kingdom under the Qylyş program, after which he was appointed director of TN KazMunaiGaz Singapore from February to June 2006. From 2006 to 2008, he returned to Astana as director of the Oil and Petroleum Products Export Department of KazMunayGas Trading House JSC, and from 2008 to 2010, he held the position of commercial director at Kazakhoil Aktobe LLP.

In September and October 2010, Aqkenjenov served as an advisor to the general director of KazMunayGas Onimderi JSC in Astana. From 2011 to 2012, he was director of the Oil and Petroleum Products Export Department at KazMunayGas Refining and Marketing JSC. From 2013 to 2014, he worked in Bulgaria as deputy general director and later general director of Rompetrol Bulgaria. In May 2014, he briefly served as chief petroleum and petroleum products trading director of KMG International (Rompetrol) in Romania, followed by his appointment as chief retail officer from June to November 2015. He continued at KMG International from 2015 to 2016 as an advisor to the general director.

From 2016 to 2020, Aqkenjenov worked in private-sector structures related to the processing and transportation of oil and petroleum products. From July 2022 to June 2023, he returned to the national oil company as head of the Petroleum Products Marketing Department of JSC NC KazMunayGas in Astana.

From 21 June 2023, he served as Vice Minister of Energy of the Republic of Kazakhstan, and on 19 March 2025, Aqkenjenov was appointed Minister of Energy of the Republic of Kazakhstan by the presidential decree of Kassym-Jomart Tokayev.

== Awards ==
- Order of Kurmet (23 October 2024)
- Medal "10 Years of the Eurasian Economic Union" (26 December 2024)
