= Kovkab Safaraliyeva =

Azerbaijani musician (1907–1985)

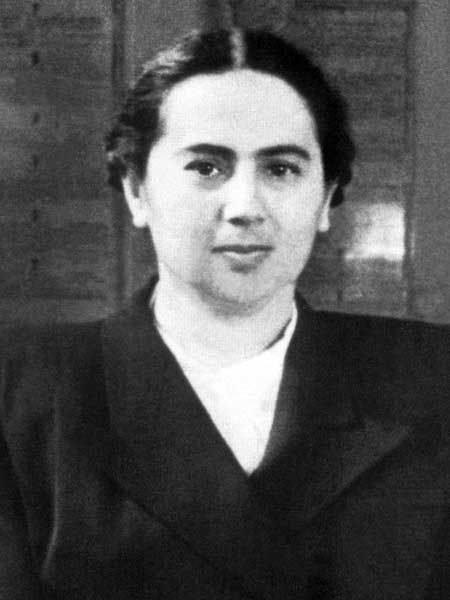
Kovkab Kamil qizi Safaraliyeva

Kovkab Kamil qizi Safaraliyeva (Azerbaijani: Kövkəb Səfərəliyeva; 3 January 1907 in Baku – 27 June 1985 in Baku) was an Azerbaijani classical pianist, piano instructor, and concertmaster.

== Career ==
She was born in Baku (then part of the Russian Empire, now the capital of Azerbaijan) and was one of the five children of Kamil Safaraliyev and Gamartaj Ziyadkhanova. Her parents, particularly fond of music and willing to share their interests with their children, hired private music tutors for them. Kovkab and her sisters were trained in piano; one of her brothers played the violin, and the other one the cello. After the Sovietization of Azerbaijan in 1920, she started attending a public piano course, and in 1926 she was admitted to the Azerbaijan State Conservatory. At the same time, due to her outstanding skills, Safaraliyeva was selected to train students as a teacher's assistant, as well as to teach polyphony and musical literature to Azeriphone students.

In the early 1930s, she performed as a pianist at the Baku Labour Theatre, and later worked as a concertmistress at the Azerbaijan Opera Theatre. After doing probation work in Moscow in 1935–1936,– Safaraliyeva returned to Baku to teach at her alma mater. She was remembered by many for being a very hardworking, talented, demanding, and charismatic instructor.

Between 1930 and 1939, Kovkab Safaraliyeva made numerous performances as a member of chamber orchestras. She is also the author of the widely used text Plays Performed on the Piano Based on Azerbaijani Mugham, as well as a number of research articles.
