= Leman Atakishiyeva =

Azerbaijani conductor (1933–2015)

Leman Atakishiyeva Azerbaijani: Ləman Atakişiyeva
- Born: 3 August 1933; Baku, Azerbaijan SSR, Soviet Union
- Died: 2015 (aged 81–82)
- Genres: Classical, opera
- Occupations: Composer, conductor

Leman Atakishiyeva (3 August 1933, Baku – 2015) was an Azerbaijani conductor, choirmaster, professor at the Azerbaijan State Conservatory (now known as the Baku Academy of Music) in Baku, and an Honored Artist of the Azerbaijan SSR (1987).

She was the organizer and artistic director of the chamber choir under the Azerbaijan Choral Society from 1976 to 1989.

== Early life and education ==
Leman Atakishiyeva was born on 3 August 1933 in Baku into a family of educators – Hasan Atakishiyev and Sakina Terequlova. She received her initial musical education at the ten-year music school affiliated with the Azerbaijan State Conservatory, graduating in 1951. She then completed her studies in the choir-conducting department of the conservatory under the tutelage of L.V. Frolova.

== Career ==
In May 1955, she was appointed the chief conductor of the second song festival organized by A. Yurlov.

In 1956, Atakishiyeva began her pedagogical career at the conservatory and was promoted to senior teacher in 1961. That same year, she started working at the newly established opera studio at the conservatory and led the studio's choir for twelve years.

From 1966 to 1969, Atakishiyeva continued her education as a postgraduate student at the Gnessin State Musical Pedagogical Institute in Moscow.

Upon returning from Moscow, she continued her pedagogical work at the conservatory as an associate professor in the choral-conducting department.

In 1976, she was appointed the artistic director of the chamber choir under the Azerbaijan Choral Society. She toured extensively with the choir and performed numerous concerts.

In 1981, Atakishiyeva was invited to the Atatürk Istanbul Opera and Ballet Theatre in Istanbul as the chief choirmaster, where she prepared more than ten works by Russian and Western composers over three seasons. She worked on Turkish composer Adnan Saygun's large-scale vocal-symphonic piece "Dastan", dedicated to Atatürk.

After returning to Baku, she worked as the chief choirmaster at the Azerbaijan State Academic Opera and Ballet Theater for a year while continuing her teaching activities. Later, she focused solely on her pedagogical work.

In 1992, Atakishiyeva was elected professor at the Azerbaijan State Conservatory through a competitive process.

In 2001, she moved to Moscow at the invitation of the Russian Choral Art Academy and worked there until 2010, training many choirmasters.

== Death ==
Leman Atakishiyeva died in 2015.

== Awards ==
She was awarded the honorary title "Honored Artist of the Azerbaijan SSR" on 30 December 1987.
