= Mursal Badirov =

Mursal Badirov Mürsəl Bədirov
- Born: October 27, 1931 Makhachkala, Dagestan ASSR, TSFSR, USSR
- Died: February 26, 2003 (aged 71) Baku, Azerbaijan
- Genres: opera
- Occupation: singer
- Years active: 1951–2003

Mursal Taghi oghlu Badirov (Azerbaijani: Mürsəl Tağı oğlu Bədirov, October 27, 1931 – February 26, 2003) was an Azerbaijani opera baritone, professor (1992), People's Artiste of the Azerbaijan SSR (1979).

== Biography ==
Mursal Badirov was born on October 27, 1931, in Dagestan ASSR. In 1951–1956, he received vocal education at the Azerbaijan State Conservatory. After graduating in 1956, Mursal Badirov worked as a soloist at the Opera and Ballet Theatre.

Since 1972, he worked in the vocal department of the Azerbaijan State Conservatory. Mursal Badirov toured as a soloist in the Czech Republic, Hungary and other countries.

He died on February 26, 2003, in Baku.

== Awards ==
- People's Artiste of the Azerbaijan SSR — February 23, 1979
- Honored Artist of the Azerbaijan SSR — June 29, 1964
- Medal "For Distinguished Labour"
