= Zülfia Süleimenova =

Kazakh politician (born 1990)

- Зүлфия Сүлейменова
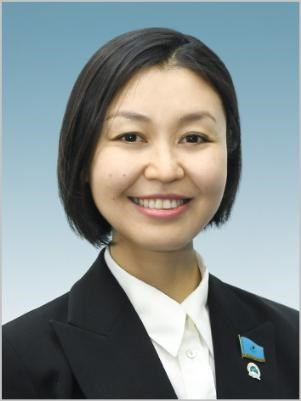
- Süleimenova in 2021

Minister of Ecology, Geology and Natural Resources
- In office 4 January 2023 – 1 September 2023
- President: Kassym-Jomart Tokayev
- Prime Minister: Älihan Smaiylov
- Preceded by: Serıkqali Brekeşev
- Succeeded by: Erlan Nysanbaev (Ecology and Natural Resources)

Member of the Mäjilis
- In office 15 January 2021 – 10 March 2022
- Parliamentary group: Nur Otan (2021–2022); Jaña Qazaqstan (2022)

Personal details
- Born: 25 February 1990 (age 36) Aktyubinsk, Aktyubinsk Oblast, Kazakh SSR, Soviet Union
- Party: Amanat
- Education: L. N. Gumilev Eurasian National University; National Graduate Institute for Policy Studies

Zülfia Bolatqyzy Süleimenova (Kazakh: Зүлфия Болатқызы Сүлейменова; born 25 February 1990) is a Kazakh politician who served as a Minister of Ecology, Geology and Natural Resources from 4 January 2023 to 1 September 2023, making her one of Kazakhstan's youngest ministers to serve in the government. She also previously served as a deputy of the Mäjilis of the 7th convocation from 2021 to 2022.

== Biography ==
Süleimenova was born on 25 February 1990 in the city of Aktobe. She graduated from the bachelor's and master's programs of the L. N. Gumilev Eurasian National University with a degree in International Relations and received a PhD degree from the National Graduate Institute for Policy Studies under the program "Security and International Studies".

Süleimenova worked as deputy director of the Department of Climate Policy and Green Technologies of the Ministry of Ecology, Geology and Natural Resources; consultant to the Environment and Development, Energy, and Macroeconomic Policy and Development Finance Divisions of the United Nations Economic and Social Commission for Asia and the Pacific in Bangkok; United Nations Development Programme offices in Kazakhstan and Turkmenistan; researcher at the Kazakhstan Institute for Strategic Studies. In 2019, Süleimenova joined the Presidential Youth Personnel Reserve.

Since 15 January 2021, Süleimenova served as a deputy of the lower house Mäjilis of the Parliament of Kazakhstan in the 7th convocation, where she served in the Committee on International Affairs, Defense and Security. She was originally elected from the Nur Otan party-list following the 2021 legislative election. From February 2022, Süleimenova was one of deputies in the Jaña Qazaqstan parliamentary group, while continuing serving in her Mäjilis seat before stepping down following the termination of her mandate on 10 March 2022.

After working as a deputy, she was subsequently appointed as the Vice Minister of Ecology, Geology and Natural Resources on 14 March 2022.

She was appointed National Coordinator of Kazakhstan for the Global Environment Facility on 3 June 2022 by Prime Minister Älihan Smaiylov.

On 4 January 2023, Süleimenova was appointed as the Minister of Ecology and Natural Resources by President Kassym-Jomart Tokayev's decree. During her ministerial tenure, Suleimenova faced infamy as she grappled with the 2023 Kazakhstan wildfires. A public scandal erupted when 14 employees of the Semey Ormany State Forest Nature Reserve tragically perished in the fire, highlighting a critical lack of necessary equipment. Since the nature reserve fell under the responsibility of the Ministry of Ecology and Natural Resources, there have been calls for resignation and potential prosecution against Süleimenova. In June 2023, The Deputy Prosecutor General of Kazakhstan, Jandos Ömiraliev, announced the investigation against Suleimenova following the death of Semey Ormany workers incident. In addition, another subsequent scandal occurred on internet regarding Süleimenova as her father, Bolat Kalimullovich Suleimenov, was revealed to have been convicted of embezzlement in four years with confiscation of property in 2011. After being relieved from her ministerial job on 1 September 2023 and succeeded by Erlan Nysanbaev as the Minister of Ecology and Natural Resources, On 5 September 2023, Süleimenova in her Instagram post congratulated Nurjan Nurjigitov in a newly formed Ministry of Water Resources and Irrigation for his appointment. From there, she highlighted her own achievements as a minister which included an increased water inflow into the Aral Sea, efforts to minimize crop losses in the Jambyl Region, and initiatives to eradicate the 'black market' in the water sector. She also mentioned work on providing drinking water to residents of specific districts, restructuring international loans, submitting international conventions for ratification, and engaging in negotiations related to transboundary water use with Uzbekistan and China.

Since 21 September 2023, she has been serving as an Advisor to the President – Special Representative of the President of the Republic of Kazakhstan for International Environmental Cooperation.

== Criticism ==
According to Kazakh journalist Mikhail Kozachkov, the Presidential Administration of Kazakhstan was allegedly offered to dismiss Süleimenova from the Ministry of Ecology and Natural Resources, due to former minister Serıkqali Brekeşev raising issues about her refusal to issue an environmental permit to CNPC-Aktobemunaigas JSC, which led to allegations of personal motives tied to her family's history with the company. The controversy also encompassed her performance in various roles, including delays, missed meetings, and frequent sick leaves. Despite these concerns, Süleimenova assumed the position of Minister of Ecology and Natural Resources in January 2023.

Süleimenova's successful growing career also became associated by others due to her kinship with the politician Erlan Karin, the State Counselor of Kazakhstan. She was criticized for her lack of appropriate education in the field of ecology. Also, for carrying teams that are not specialists in the field of ecology. Süleimenova's unpopular decision to make crime boss, Zañgar Hasenov, as her assistant was criticized.

== Personal life ==
During an interview in one of programs of the Khabar Agency, Süleimenova revealed that she was strictly vegan stating, "I don't wear skin products, I don't eat meat. I believe that the moral consideration of animals should begin with humans, ourselves. I do not use animal-tested cosmetics, I do not go to zoos, dolphinariums, this is my personal decision."
