= Aliya Teregulova =

Azerbaijani Soviet actress

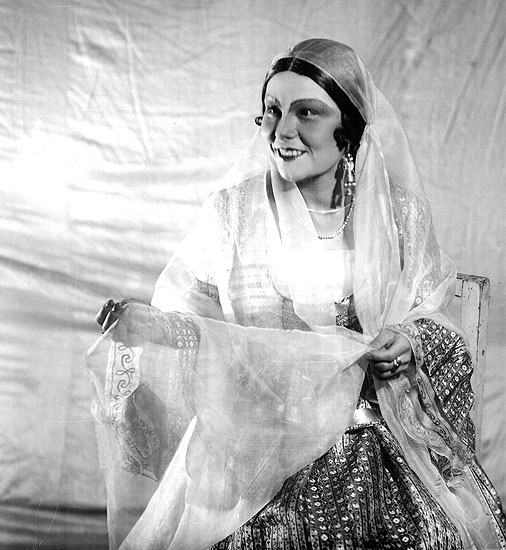
- Born: Aliya Ramazan gizi Teregulova; May 13, 1913; Tbilisi, Georgia
- Died: March 13, 1968 (aged 54); Moscow, Russia
- Occupation: Actress

Aliya Ramazan gizi Teregulova (Azerbaijani: Aliyə Ramazan qızı Terequlova; 13 May 1913, Tbilisi – 13 March 1968, Moscow) was an Azerbaijani Soviet actress. She was awarded a title of Honored Artist of the Republic of Azerbaijan (1943).

== Life and career ==
Aliya Teregulova was born on 13 May 1913 in Tbilisi. Since the age of ten, she was regularly involved in music activities. In 1930, Teregulova graduated Azerbaijan State Turkish Music College.

From 1932, she was a soloist of the Opera and Ballet Theater. In 1937, Teregulova graduated from the vocal department of the Azerbaijan State Conservatory. When the Azerbaijan State Theater of Musical Comedy was opened in 1938, she was invited to the troupe.

Since 1942, Teregulova worked as an actress at the Musical Comedy Theater. The same year she played in the play Let It Be, Let It Be directed by Shamsi Badalbeyli. In 1943, Teregubova was awarded the title of Honored Artist of the Republic of Azerbaijan.

In 1949, when the Azerbaijan State Theater of Musical Comedy was closed, Teregulova worked in the Musical Variety Ensemble, created at the Philharmonic and the Theater of the Young Spectator. In 1955, she worked at the Vakhtangov Theater in Moscow. After the reopening of the Musical Comedy Theater in 1956, she worked there for some time.

For the last 10 years of her life, Aliya Teregulova lived in Moscow and died there on 14 March 1968.

== Filmography ==
- 1932 – Handless People (full-length feature film)
