= Shlonsky =

Shlonsky is a Jewish surname. Notable people with the surname include:

- Avraham Shlonsky (1900–1973), Russian Empire–born Israeli poet and editor
- Verdina Shlonsky (1905–1990), Russian Empire–born Israeli composer, pianist, publicist and painter; sister of Abraham
