= List of Äkims of Mangystau Region =

This is the list of äkıms of Mañğystau Region that have held the position since 1992.

== List of Äkıms ==
- Fyodor Novikov (12 February 1992 – 18 November 1993)
- Läzzat Qiynov (18 November 1993 – 29 September 1995)
- Vyacheslav Levitin (29 September 1995 – 4 December 1997)
- Nikolai Baev (4 December 1997 – 18 February 1999)
- Läzzat Qiynov (18 February 1999 – 20 February 2002)
- Bolat Palymbetov (20 February 2002 – 24 January 2006)
- Qyrymbek Köşerbaev (24 January 2006 – 22 December 2011)
- Bauyrjan Mūhametjanov (22 December 2011 – 18 January 2013)
- Alik Aidarbaev (18 January 2013 – 14 March 2017)
- Eraly Toğjanov (14 March 2017 – 13 June 2019)
- Serıkbai Tūrymov (13 June 2019 – 7 September 2021)
- Nurlan Nogaev (7 September 2021 – 16 May 2024)
- Nurdaulet Kilybai (since 17 May 2024)
