= Nurdaulet Kilybai =

Kazakh politician (born 1978)

Nurdäulet Qilybai
- Нұрдәулет Қилыбай
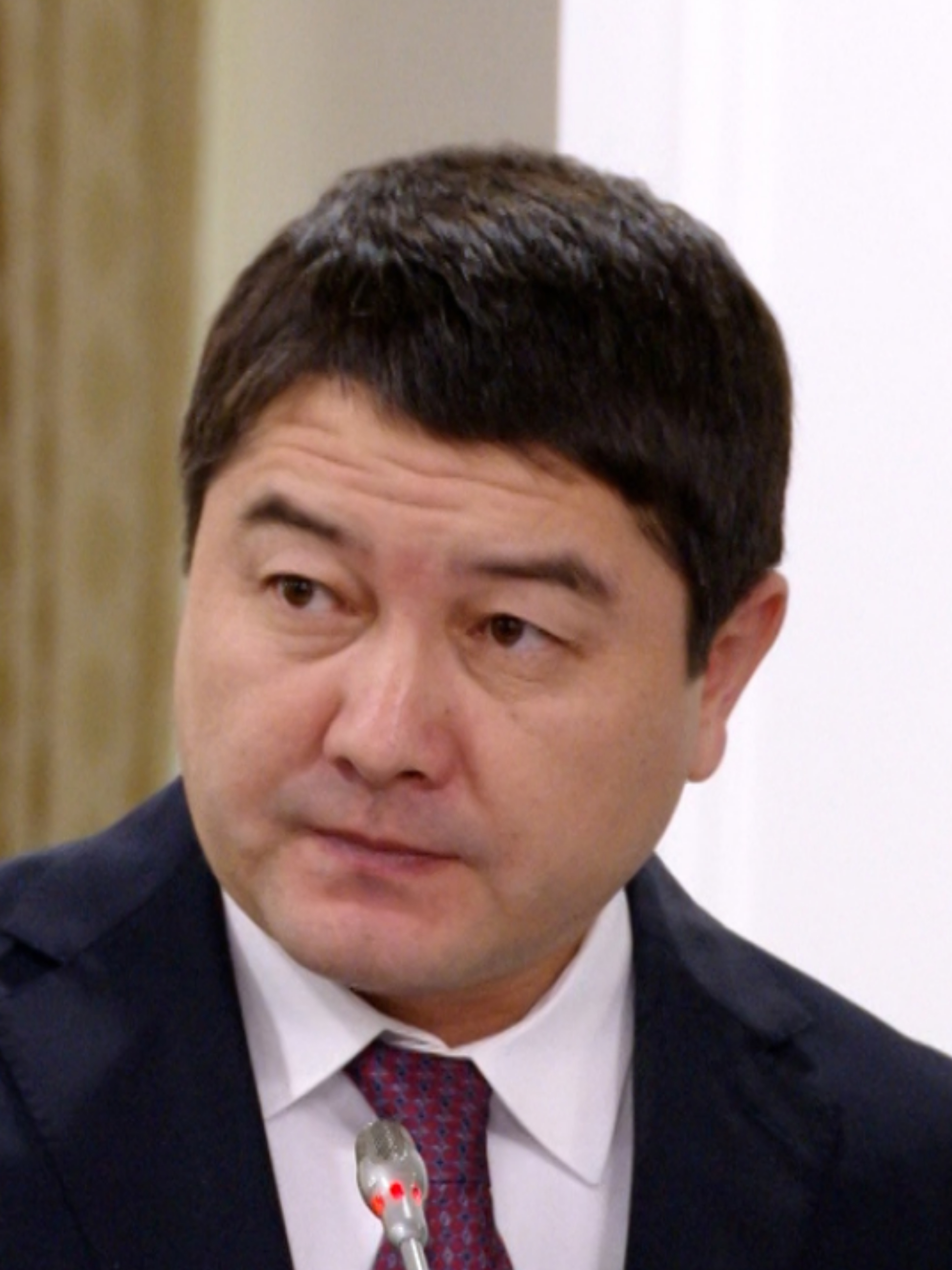
- Qilybai in 2025

Akim of Mangystau Region
- Incumbent
- Assumed office 17 May 2024
- President: Kassym-Jomart Tokayev
- Preceded by: Nurlan Nogaev

Akim of Aktau
- In office 29 June 2020 – 3 October 2022
- President: Kassym-Jomart Tokayev
- Preceded by: Galymzhan Niyazov
- Succeeded by: Erbol Izbergenov

Personal details
- Born: 10 April 1978 (age 48) Beyneu, Mangystau Region, Kazakh SSR, Soviet Union
- Education: Stafford House Boston
- Alma mater: Almaty Institute of Railway Transport Engineers; Eurasian National University
- Awards: Medal for Distinguished Labor

Military service
- Allegiance: Kazakhstan
- Branch/service: Armed Forces of Kazakhstan
- Years of service: 1999–2000

Nurdäulet Igilikūly Qilybai (Note: Often transliterated as Nurdaulet Igilikovich Kilybai through a Russified Romanization of Нурдаулет Игиликович Килыбай.) (Kazakh: Нұрдәулет Игілікұлы Қилыбай; born 10 April, 1978) is a Kazakh engineer and politician serving as akim of Mangystau Region since 2024. Previously, he served as akim of Aktau from 2020 to 2022.

== Early life and education ==
Nurdaulet Igilikuly Kilybai was born on April 10, 1978, in Beyneu, a village in Beyneu District, Mangystau Region, Kazakh Soviet Socialist Republic, Soviet Union (now Kazakhstan).

In 1999, Kilybai graduated from the Almaty Institute of Railway Transport Engineers (now ALT University) with a degree in organization of rail transport. He studied at the Eurasian National University received a degree in finance in 2003. In 2018, he graduated from the Stafford House in Boston, U.S.

== Early career ==
Kilybai's first position was as a station duty intern at RZD-16 of the Mangyshlak division of the Atyrau branch of Kazakhstan Temir Joly (KTJ). In February 1999, at age 20, he was conscripted for military service and served in Russia. After returning from service in October 2000, he resumed work at Station “R.” A month later, he moved to Astana and joined KTJ as a freight/receiving clerk, later promoted to senior clerk.

He remained there until February 2002, when he joined the company Infrastructure as chief specialist in the Technical Department of the Technical Directorate. In July 2002, Kilybai returned to KTJ and, until February 2005, held several roles within the Technical Directorate and the Mainline Network Directorate, including chief specialist, department head, and assistant to the director.

In February 2005, he transferred to the Ministry of Transport and Communications, where he served in the Committee for Transport and Communication. Kilybai's posts included acting head of the Department of Forecasting and Subsidies for Passenger Transport, head of the Department of Economic Analysis, Forecasting and Budget Programs, head of the Department of Economic and Tariff Policy for Railway Transport, and later deputy chairman of the Committee.

== Business career ==
In June 2009, Nurdaulet Kilybai was appointed president of the joint-stock company Vokzal-Service (Kazakh: ”Вокзал-сервис” АҚ; Russian: АО «Вокзал Сервис»), a position he held for five months. In January 2010, he returned to KTJ as managing director for passenger transport. After nine months, he went back to the Ministry of Transport and Communications to head the Committee for Transport and Communication.

From late September to November 2011 he served as advisor to the president of KTJ. On December 10, Nurdaulet Kilybai moved to Aktau and led the Aktau branch of KTJ until June 25, 2012. Returning to Astana that June, Kilybai again appointed head of the Committee for Transport and Communication. On August 8, 2013, he rejoined KTJ to head its executive office while also serving as a managing director.

On September 10, 2015, the KTJ board approved Kilybai's appointment as president of its subsidiary Passenger Transport (Kazakh: Жолаушылар тасымалы; Russian: Пассажирские перевозки). By presidential order of KTJ dated March 24, 2017, he additionally became the executive director of Passenger Transport. On November 22, 2017, the KTJ board appointed him president of another subsidiary, Temirjolsu.

== Political career ==
After several years in business, on December 5, 2018, Mangystau Region akim Eraly Togjanov appointed Nurdaulet Kilybai deputy akim of region, marking the start of his political career. On June 29, 2020, Kilybai was appointed akim of Aktau by regional akim Serikbay Trumov with the approval of the Presidential Administration.

On October 3, 2022, Nurdaulet Kilybai was named deputy akim of the region by akim Nurlan Nogaev. After three months in that post, on January 25, 2023, the board of directors of Ozenmunaigas (Kazakh: ”ӨзенМұнайГаз“ АҚ; Russian: АО «Озенмунайгаз»), a subsidiary of KazMunayGas, appointed Kilybai as its CEO and chairman.

On May 17, 2024, president Kassym-Jomart Tokayev proposed Nurdaulet Kilybai and akim of Aktau Ulugbek Tnaliev for the post of akim of Mangystau Region. In an open vote attended by 113 members, Kilybai received 96 votes while Tnaliev received 17. After winning the vote by Tokayev's decree No. 553 Kilybai was appointed 13th akim of Mangystau Region.

== Personal life ==
Nurdaulet Kilybai is married. According to different sources, he has either five or two children. In late 2025, he said that he went to court himself to legally recognize a child born in 2021 to former maslikhat member Yntash Nauryzova. Kilybai said he pays child support of about 20–25 percent of his salary, which is 1.9 million tenge (3689 $), admitted it was his mistake, said he was sorry, and said he does not communicate with the child.

== Awards ==
- Medal “10 years of the Parliament of the Republic of Kazakhstan” (2006)
- Badge "50 years of unified Kazakh railways" (2008)
- Medal for Distinguished Labor (2013)
- Commemorative sign "110 years of Kazakhstan railway" (2014)
- Medal "25 Years of Constitution of the Republic of Kazakhstan" (2020)
