= Agency of the Republic of Kazakhstan for Atomic Energy =

Coordinates: 51°7′52″N 71°24′44″E

- Қазақстан Республикасының Атом энергиясы жөніндегі агенттігі (Kazakh); Агентство Республики Казахстан по атомной энергии (Russian)
- Emblem of Kazakhstan

Agency overview
- Formed: 15 May 1992; 18 March 2025
- Preceding agency: Committee for Nuclear and Energy Supervision and Control
- Jurisdiction: Government of Kazakhstan
- Headquarters: Mangilik El Avenue, 57A, Astana 010000, Kazakhstan
- Chairman responsible: Almasadam Sätqaliev
- Website: www.gov.kz/memleket/entities/atom-energiyasy?lang=en

The Agency of the Republic of Kazakhstan for Atomic Energy (Kazakh: Қазақстан Республикасының Атом энергиясы жөніндегі агенттігі; Russian: Агентство Республики Казахстан по атомной энергии) is a state body responsible for subsoil use, use of nuclear energy, ensuring radiation safety of the population and the operation of the Semipalatinsk Nuclear Safety Zone in the field of uranium mining. The agency is directly subordinate to and accountable to the president of Kazakhstan.

== History ==
The Agency of the Republic of Kazakhstan for Atomic Energy was originally established on 15 May 1992 by Presidential Decree No. 779 of Nursultan Nazarbayev, "On the National Nuclear Center and the Atomic Energy Agency of the Republic of Kazakhstan". The agency was responsible for regulating atomic energy, ensuring nuclear and radiation safety, controlling nuclear materials, issuing binding decisions for all ministries and organizations, and coordinating compliance with the nuclear non-proliferation regime.

From 1997 to 1999, it operated as the Atomic Energy Agency of the Ministry of Science – Academy of Sciences of the Republic of Kazakhstan, serving as the central state regulatory body for nuclear non-proliferation, licensing and supervision of atomic energy use, state control and accounting of nuclear and dual-use materials, radiation safety, and cooperation with the International Atomic Energy Agency (IAEA), with binding authority over all entities operating in the nuclear sphere.

On 1 April 1999, after the Ministry of Science was reorganized into the Ministry of Science and Higher Education, under which the Atomic Energy Agency functioning as the Committee on Atomic Energy was placed. Later that year, a further government reorganization transferred oversight of the Committee on Atomic Energy from the defunct Ministry of Science and Higher Education to the Ministry of Energy, Industry and Trade on 29 November 1999. From 2000 to 2010, its functions were carried out within the Ministry of Energy and Mineral Resources, followed by its operation under the Ministry of Industry and New Technologies from 2010 to 2012.

On 7 May 2012, the Atomic Energy Agency was re-established as a separate body under Presidential Decree No. 321 "On the Atomic Energy Agency of the Republic of Kazakhstan", with expanded powers including licensing of atomic energy activities, intersectoral coordination, control over radioactive waste, export and import oversight of nuclear and dual-use materials, approval of regulatory and technical documentation for nuclear facilities, international cooperation (including with the IAEA), inspection and enforcement authority, management of subordinate scientific organizations, and full operational, budgetary, and administrative independence.

Between 2013 and 2014, atomic energy regulation was administered by the Atomic Energy Committee of the Ministry of Industry and New Technologies. From 2014 until 2025, these responsibilities were assigned to the Committee for Nuclear and Energy Supervision and Control within the Ministry of Energy.

On 18 March 2025, by presidential decree of Kassym-Jomart Tokayev, the Atomic Energy Agency of the Republic of Kazakhstan was reorganized and re-established as an independent state body directly subordinate to the president of the Republic of Kazakhstan.

== Functions ==
The agency carries out the following functions:

- participation in ensuring the development of the fuel and energy complex, including the construction of nuclear power plants and related infrastructure;
- creation and development of nuclear clusters;
- development of the nuclear industry, including exploration, production, and processing of uranium products;
- international cooperation in regulated areas of nuclear energy;
- ensuring the continuity of uranium production and its rational and safe use.

== Structure ==
The agency includes the Committee on Atomic Supervision and Control, which is responsible for nuclear, radiation, and nuclear physical safety.

=== Departments ===
The central apparatus of the agency consists of the following departments:

- Department of Nuclear Energy
- Department of Nuclear Industry and Subsoil Use
- Department of Science and Innovation
- Department of Radioactive Waste and Environmental Protection
- Department of International Cooperation
- Department of Strategic Planning
- Department of Kazakhstan Content
- Department of Legal Services
- Department of Personnel Development and Training
- Department of Administrative Work and Digitalization
- Department of Budget and Financial Procedures
- Department of Security and State Secrets
- Internal Audit Department
- Department of Public Relations

=== Subordinate organizations ===
The agency supervises the following organizations:

- Republican State Enterprise "National Nuclear Center of the Republic of Kazakhstan"
- Republican State Enterprise "Institute of Nuclear Physics"
- Kazakhstan Nuclear Power Plants LLP

== Leadership ==
- Chairman — Almasadam Sätqaliev
- Deputy Chairmen — Timur Jantikin, Äset Mahambetov, Gumar Sergazin, Vasily Lavrenov

=== List of heads ===
- Vladimir Shkolnik (August 1992 – August 1994), Director General of the Atomic Energy Agency
- Erkin Baiädilov (August 1994 – October 1995), Director General of the Atomic Energy Agency
- Timur Jantikin (October 1995 – August 2013), head of the authorized body for atomic energy under various ministries, including Chairman of the Committee on Atomic Energy and Chairman of the Atomic Energy Agency
- MäJit Şäripov (August 2013 – August 2014), Chairman of the Committee on Atomic Energy of the Ministry of Industry and New Technologies
- Almasadam Sätqaliev (since 18 March 2025), Chairman of the Atomic Energy Agency of the Republic of Kazakhstan

== See also ==
- Nuclear power in Kazakhstan
- Ministry of Energy (Kazakhstan)
