= Gani Mammadov Residence =

- Azerbaijani: Qəni Məmmədovun evi
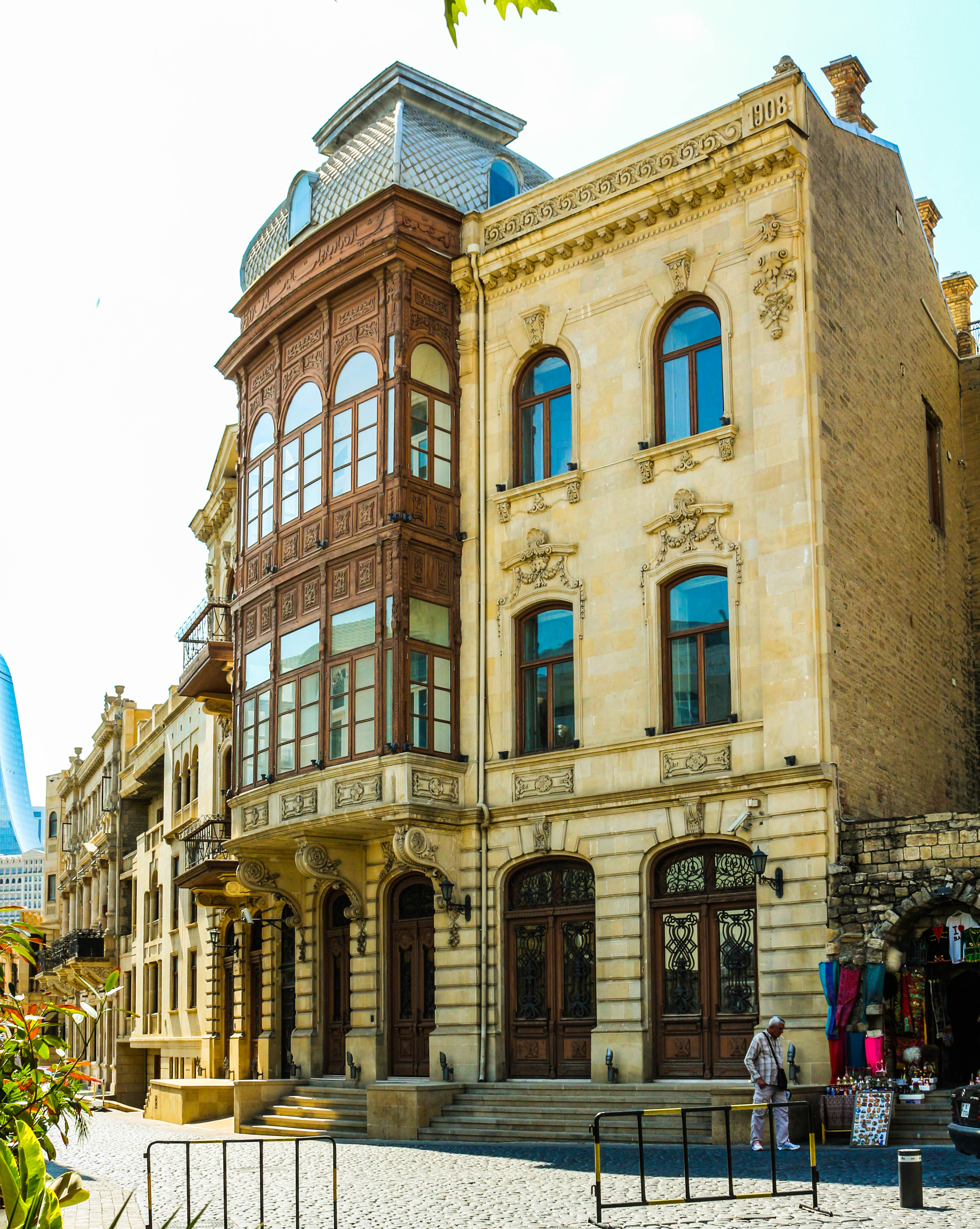

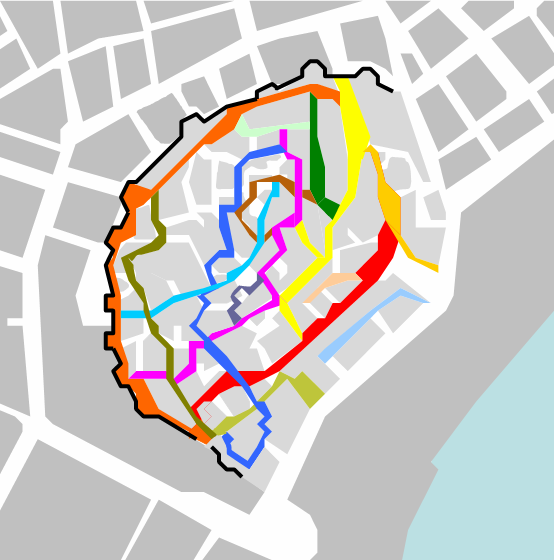
- Location within Streets in Old City, Baku, Azerbaijan

General information
- Type: House
- Location: Asaf Zeynalli Street 45, Old City, Baku, Azerbaijan
- Coordinates: 40.36509556°N 49.83538919°E
- Completed: 1908

Design and construction
- Architect: Nikolai Bayev

The Gani Mammadov Residence (Azerbaijani: Qəni Məmmədovun evi) is a former residential building located in Icherisheher – the Old City of Baku, Azerbaijan, on 45 Asaf Zeynalli Str. It is considered an architectural monument of local importance. It was designed by Armenian architect Nikolai Bayev.

== History ==
Built in 1908, on the site of a 1646 madrasah, from which only one stone portal has survived that now is used as an entrance to a miniature souvenir shop.

Gani Mamedov, a successful cotton trader, owner of sea-going vessels for the transportation of goods in the Caspian Sea between Russia, Central Asia and Iran, has ordered the construction of the residence. The project of the house was carried out by an Armenian architect Nikolai Georgievich Baev (1878–1949), a graduate of the St. Petersburg Civil Engineering Institute (1901), who subsequently designed the Opera House in Baku (1910) and a hospital (named after Nagiyev).

The three-story house was built in 1908–1909 and was restored starting in the 1990s by the Mobil company with assistance from the Baku Historical Society.

== In cinematography ==
Some scenes from the 1981 Soviet–French–Swiss film Teheran 43 were shot at the Gani Mammadov Residence.

== See also ==
- Ismailiyya Palace
- Mitrofanov Residence
- Property of Haji Mustafa Rasulov
