= Javid Samadov =

Azerbaijani opera singer (born 1987)

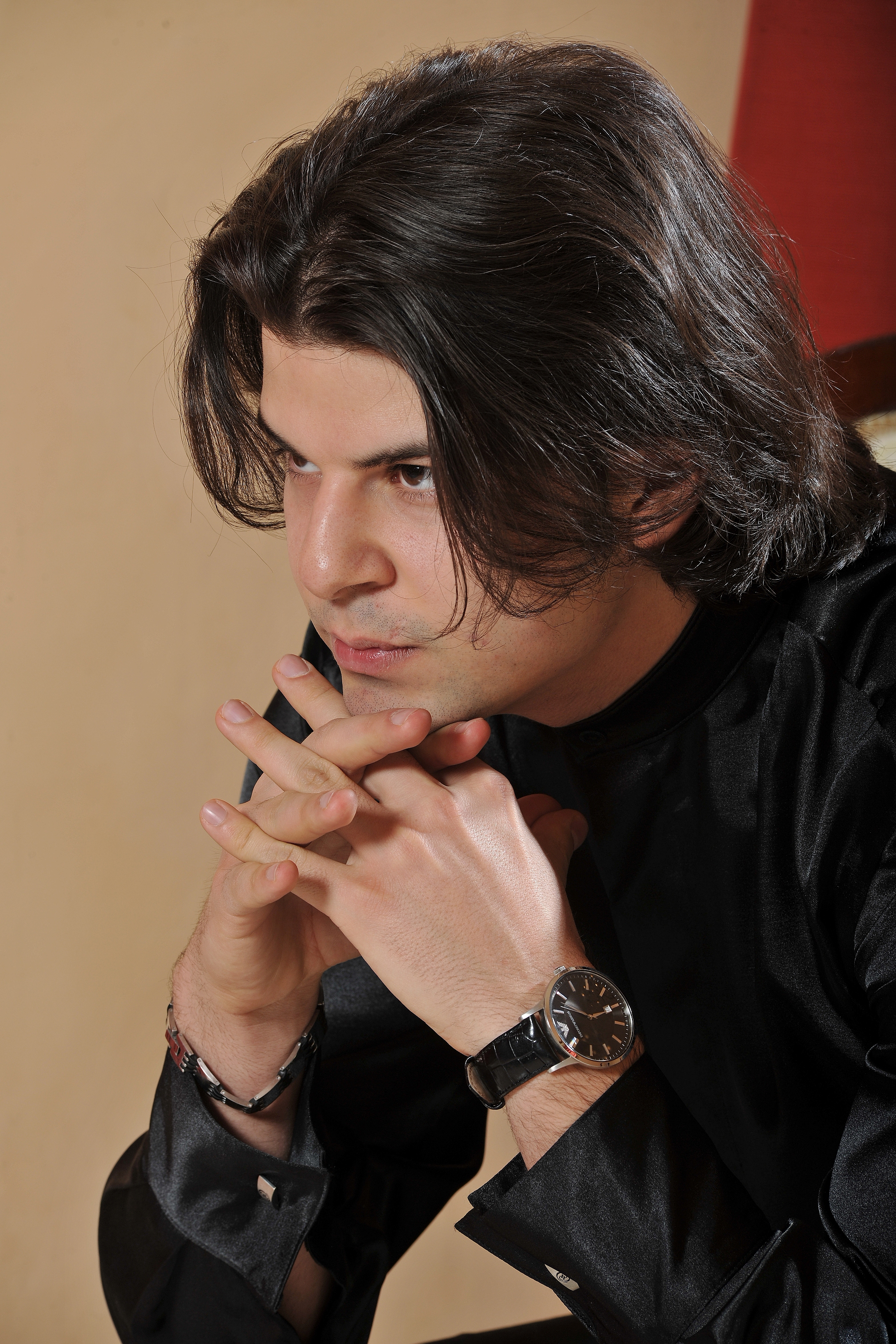
- Javid Samadov, photo by Bruno Severini
- Born: 14 May 1987 (age 38); Baku, Azerbaijan
- Occupation: Opera singer (baritone)
- Website: javidsamadov.com

Javid Samadov (born 14 May 1987) is an Azerbaijani baritone opera singer, who currently resides in Nuremberg, Germany.

== Biography ==
Born in Baku, Azerbaijan, Javid Samadov is a graduate of the Uzeyir Hajibeyov Baku Academy of Music. While still a student, he was invited to Moscow, Russia where he perfected his skills at the Galina Vishnevskaya Opera Center. Later Javid Samadov pursued his studies at the Academy of Operatic and Vocal Arts in Osimo, Italy and at the International Renata Tebaldi – Mario Del Monaco Singing Academy in Pesaro, Italy.

Javid Samadov participated in master classes given by William Matteuzzi, Harriet Lawson, Lella Cuberli, Raina Kabaivanska, Antonio Juvarra, Alla Simoni, Carlo Morganti, Mario Melani, Segio Segalini, Thomas Hampson, Pietro Spagnioli, Cinzia Forte, Verena Keller, Andreas Schuller, and Cristina Muti. He also took a master class with Maestro Vincenzo De Vivo in the Academy of Operatic and Vocal Arts in Osimo, Italy.

Samadov's career began in 2007 in at the Azerbaijan State Opera and Ballet Theatre where he appeared in the leading role of Escamilio in the opera Carmen by Georges Bizet. In 2008, he participated in the concert marking the President of Azerbaijan inauguration ceremony. In 2009, he performed a recital with the Niyazi State Television and Radio Orchestra in Baku.

Javid Samadov debuted in Europe as Belcore in The Elixir of Love by Gaetano Donizetti in Teatro Romano in Gubbio, Italy.

In July 2010, he participated in the Second Gabala International Music Festival, where he appeared with the British Royal Philharmonic Orchestra. The performance was attended by the President of Azerbaijan Ilham Aliyev, First Lady Mehriban Aliyeva and UNESCO Director-General Irina Bokova. During his performance, Samadov presented the composition Azerbaijan by Muslim Magomaev.

In October 2010, he took part in the Festival of Azerbaijani Culture with the Greek National Orchestra in Athens, Greece. In December 2011 he performed the Oratorio de Noel by Camille Saint-Saëns in Ravenna, Italy.

In November 2011, Javid Samadov performed in Internazionale Opernwerkstatt in Switzerland: in Sigriswil, Thun and Bern. He also participated in the Song Festival in Amandola, Italy.

In 2011, Javid Samadov was honored with Zirva Award as Best Debut of the Year, which is awarded for great contributions to the development and propaganda of Azerbaijan culture and music. In 2011 he was also decorated with the Award of the President of Azerbaijan.

In April 2012, Javid Samadov participated in the concert marking the twentieth anniversary of Azerbaijan's Independence in Baku. In May 2012, he appeared in the leading role of Papageno in the opera The Magic Flute by Wolfgang Amadeus Mozart in Osimo, Italy, and June 2012, in the leading role of Leporello in the opera Don Giovanni by Mozart in Tel Aviv, Israel.

In September–October 2012, he appeared in the Tribute to Muslim Magomayev series of concerts in Astana, Kazakhstan, held at the Kazakhstan Central Concert Hall, the Crocus City Hall in Krasnogorsk (near Moscow) and at the Heydar Aliyev Palace in Baku.

As a soloist in the International Opera Studio of the Staatstheater Nürnberg. throughout 2013-2014 Javid Samadov appeared at the Staatstheater Nürnberg (Nuremberg State Theatre) in the role of Masetto in opera Don Giovanni by Mozart, Roucher in the opera Andrea Chenier by Umberto Giordano, Gamekeeper in the opera Rusalka by Antonín Dvořák, Morales in the opera Carmen by Bizet, Donner Das Rheingold by Richard Wagner, Count Almaviva in The Marriage of Figaro by W.A.Mozart, Count Dominik in Arabella by Richard Strauss, Barone Douphol in La traviata by Giuseppe Verdi and Ein Nachtwächter in Les Huguenots by Giacomo Meyerbeer.

International magazine Opernwelt (Opera World) nominated Javid Samadov as the best young baritone in 2012-2013.

In October 2014, he participated in the International opera festival «Opernwerkstatt 2014» in Switzerland.

In November 2014, he appeared as a Cappadocian in Salome (opera) by Richard Strauss in Teatro di San Carlo in Naples, Italy.

In January–July 2015, he appeared as Donner in Das Rheingold by R.Wagner in the Anhaltisches Theater in Dessau.

In June 2015 in Schloss Esterházy, a palace in Eisenstadt, Austria he appeared in "Die Schneekönigin" ("Snow Queen") by S.Banewitsch, under the patronage of Anna Netrebko.

In November 2015, he appeared as Melot in Nürnberg Staatstheater production of Tristan und Isolde at Community Theatre of Modena (Teatro Comunale Modena)

In January 2016, he appeared in SWR Young Opera Stars Galaconcert, «Emmerich Smola Forderpreis», with Radio Philharmonic Orchestra. Conductor - Marco Comin

In this concert were performed: Leporello's aria from W.Mozart's Don Giovanni and Toreador aria from G.Bizet Carmen

In August 2016, he took part in VIII Gabala International Music Festival in Azerbaijan.

Currently he performs in Germany, Italy, Austria, Switzerland, Montenegro, Azerbaijan, Kazakhstan, Russia, Israel and Greece. In addition, he works as a vocal coach in Nuremberg, Germany

Married, has one son.

== Competitions ==
Javid Samadov won several prestigious international vocal competitions:

- Fourth Bulbul International Singing Competition - the youngest first prize laureate in four years (Baku, Azerbaijan).
- Tenth Rose Ponselle International Music Competition - first prize winner (Matera, Italy).
- First Muslim Magomaev International Singing Competition - first prize winner (Moscow, Russia)
- Concorso citta di Verona - first prize winner.
- Concorso citta di Bologna - "The Youngest Finalist in the Competition's History" award winner (Bologna, Italy).
- Fifth International Magda Olivero Singing Competition - Audience Choice Award winner (Milan, Italy).

== Repertoire ==
Javid Samadov's opera repertoire includes the following:

- Georges Bizet, Carmen – Escamilio
- Georges Bizet, Carmen – Morales
- Gaetano Donizetti, The Elixir of Love – Belcore
- Gaetano Donizetti, Don Pasquale – Malatesta
- Wolfgang Amadeus Mozart, Don Giovanni – Leporello
- Wolfgang Amadeus Mozart, Don Giovanni – Masetto
- Wolfgang Amadeus Mozart, The Marriage of Figaro – Count Almaviva
- Wolfgang Amadeus Mozart, The Magic Flute – Papageno
- Umberto Giordano, Andrea Chénier – Roucher
- Antonin Dvořák, Rusalka – Gamekeeper
- Richard Wagner, Das Rheingold – Donner
- Richard Wagner, Tristan und Isolde – Melot
- Pyotr Ilyich Tchaikovsky, Iolanta - Robert
- Giuseppe Verdi, La traviata – Barone Douphol
- Giacomo Puccini, La bohème – Marcello
- Uzeyir Hajibeyov, Leyli and Majnun – Nofel
