= Aurora Minerals Group =

Kazakh mining company

- Type: Private
- Industry: Mining
- Founded: 2015; 11 years ago
- Headquarters: Astana, Kazakhstan
- Area served: Kazakhstan
- Number of employees: 500 (2022)
- Subsidiaries: Aurora Geophysics
- Website: https://aurora.kz

Aurora Minerals Group is a Kazakhstan company that provides exploration services for the mining industry, including geophysical surveys. It was established in 2015 by Kaisar Kozhamuratov and Said Sultanov, former civil servants of the Government of Kazakhstan, and is headquartered in Astana, Kazakhstan.

== History ==
Aurora Minerals Group was founded in 2015 by Kaisar Kozhamuratov and Said Sultanov, former civil servants of the Government of Kazakhstan with experience in Kazakhstan's mining industry. Kozhamuratov previously served as Deputy Head of the Republican Centre for Geological Information, KazGeoInform under the Ministry of Industry and New Technologies, and later as Managing Director of KazGeology, a national exploration company. Meanwhile, Sultanov held senior positions within KazGeoInform and KazGeology.

In 2017, it signed a three-year contract with Airbus Defence and Space for remote sensing services. In 2018, Aurora Minerals Group was the sole Kazakh company representing the mining industry at the Prospectors & Developers Association of Canada (PDAC) conference in Toronto.

In March 2023, Aurora Minerals Group entered into a partnership with MSALABS, a geochemical analytical laboratory, to set up an analytical facility in Kazakhstan.

In December 2023, Aurora Minerals Group was awarded the Isker Prize by the President of Kazakhstan in recognition of their commitment to quality.

== Subsidiaries ==
The company's subsidiaries include Nova Drilling, specializing in vertical and horizontal well core drilling, Aurora Quest Services Ltd., focusing on diamond core, RC, geothermal, and water well drilling, and Aurora Geophysics Ltd, performing ground and airborne surveys of various scales.

== Allegations ==
Aurora Minerals Group has faced allegations of investor fund diversion. The company's founders face allegations of embezzling investor funds and using government influence to pressure investors to exit the country. These claims have contributed to discussions regarding the challenges junior mining companies face in Kazakhstan. Transparency and regulatory efficiency within the Kazakh mining sector have been cited as potential areas of concern.

According to various news reports, it is purportedly under the control of Russian investors. When speaking to Newsweek, the company denied these allegations.

The Daily Express reported it to be not licensed as a mining operator but rather a service and consultancy provider in mining operations.

== See also ==
- Mineral industry of Kazakhstan
- Uranium mining in Kazakhstan
- Ministry of Ecology, Geology and Natural Resources (Kazakhstan)
