= Baku Academy of Music =

Music academy in Baku

Coordinates: 40°22′38″N 49°50′40″E

Hajibeyov Baku Academy of Music
- Hacıbəyov adına Bakı Musiqi Akademiyası
- Type: Public
- Established: 1920
- Location: Baku, Azerbaijan
- Website: musicacademy.edu.az

The Hajibeyli Baku Academy of Music (Azeri: Hacıbəyli adına Bakı Musiqi Akademiyası) is a music school in Baku, Azerbaijan. It was established in 1920 in Baku and was previously known as the Hajibeyli Azerbaijan State Conservatoire.

== History ==
In 1920, Azerbaijani composer Uzeyir Hajibeyli began a movement aimed at propagating classical music among the people. His report presented at the Azerbaijani People's Commissariat of Education (early Soviet analogue of a Ministry of Education) offering the establishment of a high-level music education institution resulted in the approval of his proposal. Thus, the Azerbaijan State Conservatoire was founded on 25 May 1920. The charter of the Azerbaigan State Conservatory was approved by the Council of the People's Commisars of the Azerbaijan SSR on 21 August 1921. Hajibeyli became one of its first instructors.

In the 1920s, Hajibeyli established the Oriental Department, where Azeri folk music was taught both traditionally (orally) and by European methods, i.e. using notes. Along with composer Muslim Magomayev, he developed the textbook Azeri Folk Songs, published in 1927. In 1939, Hajibeyli was made head of the Conservatoire.

In 1930, the Saint Thaddeus and Bartholomew Armenian Cathedral of Baku was demolished as part of the early Soviet atheist policy to make way for the construction of the new academy building.

During World War II, the conservatoire executives organized hundreds of concerts for military units and soldiers who recovered in hospitals. It was enhanced with the Bulbul Specialized Secondary Music School in 1931, the Music Studio School in 1980, and the Mammadova Opera Studio in 1984.

In 1991, it was renamed Hajibeyli Baku Academy of Music.

== Academics ==
There are three faculties and 18 departments. The academy offers graduating students master's, kandidat's, and doctorate degrees. There are two research laboratories — the Restoration and Improvement of Ancient Musical Instruments Laboratory, established in 1991, and the Investigation of Professional Oral Music Traditions Laboratory, established in 1992.

== Notable staff and alumni ==
- Gara Garayev
- Fikrat Amirov
- Soltan Hajibeyov
- Jovdat Hajiyev
- Arif Melikov
- Khayyam Mirzazadeh
- Sona Aslanova
- Polad Bülbüloğlu
- Tofig Guliyev
- Ismayil Hajibeyov
- Vagif Mustafazade
- Muslim Magomayev
- Ödön Pártos
- Kovkab Safaraliyeva
- Vladimir Shainsky
- Asaf Zeynalli
- Dilara Kazimova
- Javid Samadov
- Yusif Akhundzade
- Fidan Aghayeva-Edler
- Emin Sabitoglu
- Aliya Teregulova
- Tatiana Sheinin
- Aida Huseynova
- Leman Atakishiyeva
- Mursal Badirov
- Elmira Abasova
- Yuno Avshalumov
