= Nurlan Nogaev =

Kazakh politician (born 1967)

- Нұрлан Ноғаев
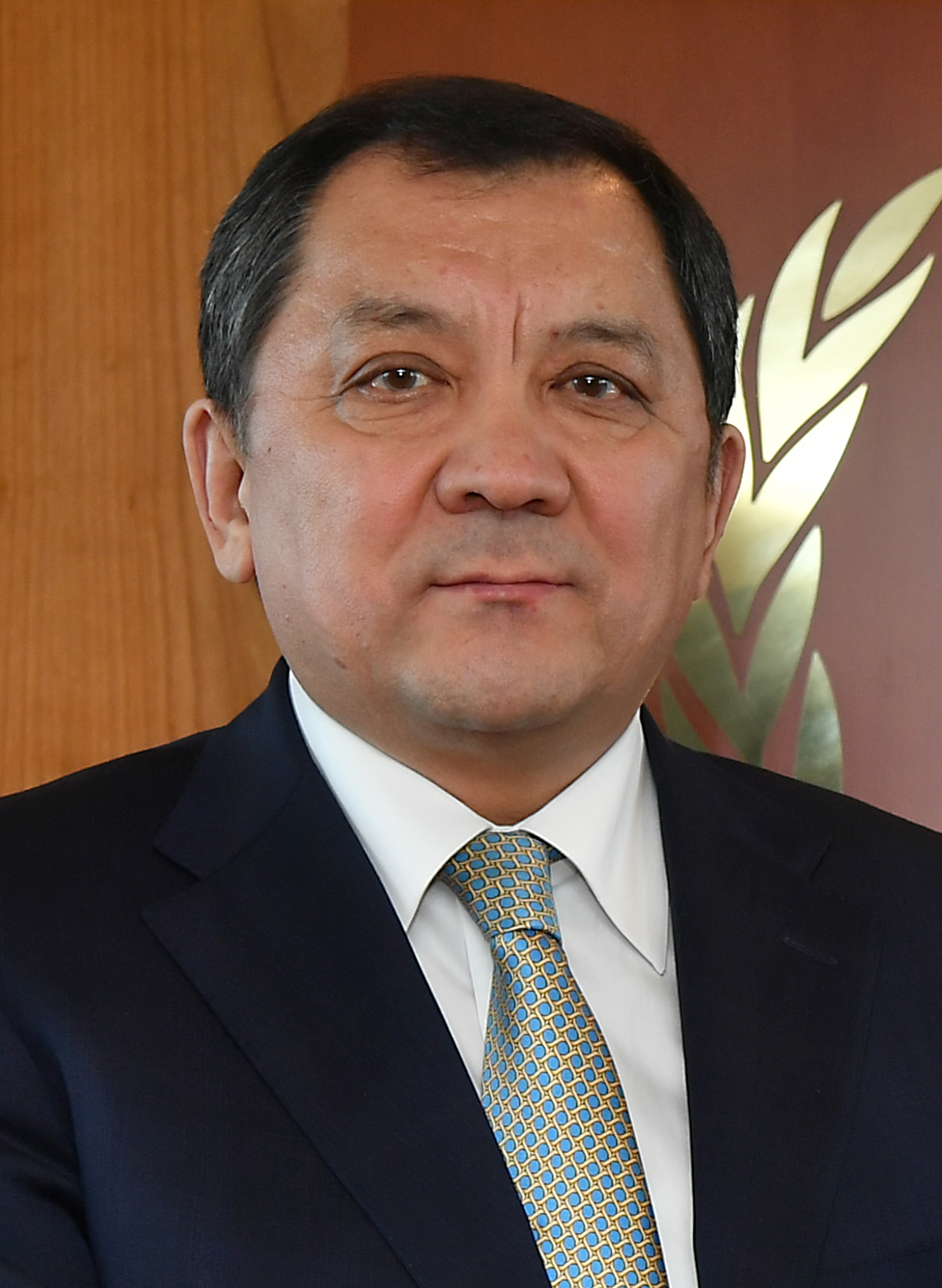
- Nogaev in 2020

Ambassador of Kazakhstan to Turkmenistan
- Incumbent
- Assumed office 20 June 2024
- Preceded by: Asqar Täjibaev

Äkim of Mangystau Region
- In office 7 September 2021 – 16 May 2024
- Preceded by: Serıkbai Tūrymov

Minister of Energy
- In office 18 December 2019 – 7 September 2021
- President: Kassym-Jomart Tokayev
- Prime Minister: Askar Mamin
- Preceded by: Kanat Bozumbayev
- Succeeded by: Magzum Myrzagaliev

Äkim of Atyrau Region
- In office 26 March 2016 – 18 December 2019
- Preceded by: Baktykozha Izmukhambetov
- Succeeded by: Mahambet Dosmuhambetov

Äkim of West Kazakhstan Region
- In office January 2012 – 26 March 2016
- Preceded by: Baktykozha Izmukhambetov
- Succeeded by: Altai Kólginov

Personal details
- Born: 30 July 1967 (age 59) Oktyabrsk, Kazakh SSR, Soviet Union
- Party: Nur Otan
- Spouse: Bagdagul Akhmetova
- Children: 6
- Education: Gubkin Russian State University of Oil and Gas; Moscow State Institute of International Relations

Nūrlan Asqarūly Noğaev (Kazakh: Нұрлан Асқарұлы Ноғаев; born 30 July 1967) is a Kazakh politician who has served as the Ambassador of Kazakhstan to Turkmenistan since 2024.

Nogaev previously served as the Äkim of Mangystau Region from 2021 to 2024, Minister of Energy from 2019 until 2021 and prior to that, he was the äkım of West Kazakhstan and Atyrau regions from 2012 to 2019.

== Biography ==
=== Early life and education ===
Born in the city of Oktyabrsk (present day Kandyagash), Nogaev attended the Gubkin Russian State University of Oil and Gas in Moscow where he earned specialty in mining engineering. In 1999, Nogaev majored in the Kazakh State Academy of Management in economics.

He currently holds a Master's degree in Business Administration from the Moscow State Institute of International Relations.

=== Early career ===
Nogaev began his career as an electrician at the Kandagach Station in his hometown. From 1993, he worked as senior expert on petroleum products, head of department, general director of Gili-Pasker LLP in Moscow. In 1995, he became deputy general of the small enterprise Otrar Ltd in Almaty and from 1996, was marketing engineer, head of marketing, sales of Oil and Petroleum Products Department, General Director of Kazakhturkmunai LLP.

In February 2006, he was appointed as an executive director of KazMunayGas and from August of that year, was the director of the Oil Industry Department of the Ministry of Energy and Mineral Resources.

=== Political career ===
In September 2007, Nogaev was appointed as deputy äkım of West Kazakhstan Region under Baktykozha Izmukhambetov. From there, he was promoted as the first deputy äkım in April 2010 and eventually took over office as the Äkım of West Kazakhstan Region on 20 January 2012 after Izmukhanbetov became a member of the Mazhilis. On 26 March 2016, Nogaev was transferred Atyrau Region where he continued on serving as the region's äkım. During his tenure, under the Agriculture Ministry's permission, restricted fishing in the Caspian Sea.

On 18 December 2019, under presidential decree, Nogaev was appointed as the Minister of Energy. He served the post until 7 September 2021, when Nogaev was relieved from his duties and was appointed to the äkım post again in the Mangystau Region, while the Ecology and Natural Resources Minister Magzum Myrzagaliev succeeded Nogaev as the Energy Minister.

After assuming office as Mangystau Region which was met with mixed reactions, Nogaev faces challenges in the region of which is plagued by drought and livestock deaths and series of strikes and labour conflicts.

On 16 May 2024, President Tokayev removed him from his position.

On 20 June 2024, Nogaev was appointed as the Ambassador of Kazakhstan to Turkmenistan.
