= Mailov brothers =

Armenian oil magnates, businessmen and philanthropists

The Mailyan brothers (also spelled Mailoff) (Armenian: Մայիլյան եղբայրներ) were oil magnates, businessmen, and philanthropists of Armenian descent. Some sources consider them to be the first producers of caviar in Russia. They were also known for sponsoring numerous cultural projects in Baku, such as the Mailov Theatre (now known as the Azerbaijan State Academic Opera and Ballet Theater), in addition to many investment projects in Armenia.

== Overview ==
The Mailyan brothers consisted of three brothers: Daniel, Ivan (Hovhannes), and Lazarus (Yeghia). The brothers were industrial capitalists who amassed a major fortune from oil. They were also successful in the caviar trade, founding the first company that produced caviar in Russia. Due to their success in the caviar industry, they were known as the "Kings of fish roe".

However, after the Russian Revolution, the Mailyan family sought refuge in France.

== Mailyan theatre ==
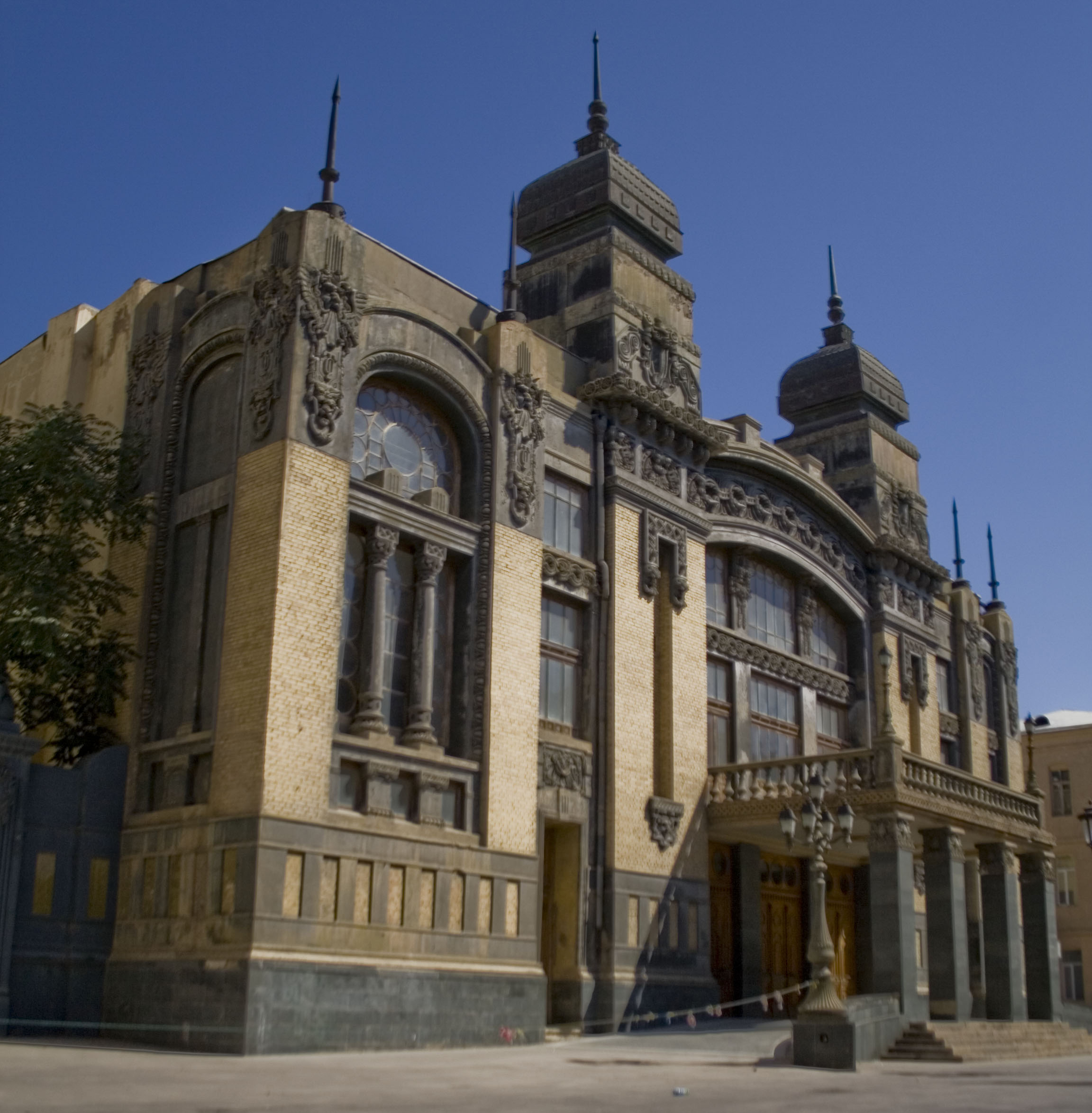
Mailov Theatre (now Azerbaijan State Academic Opera and Ballet Theater)

According to legend, a famous opera-soprano singer (which according to sources is either Antonina Nezhdanova or a certain Italian opera singer) visited Baku and had many performances in various casinos and residences in the city. However, when asked if she would return to Baku, she refused because she found that there was no decent opera house in the city. Daniel Mailov, who admired the personality and voice of the opera singer, commissioned an opera house to be built under the condition that she return to the city.

The theatre was commissioned by the Mailyan brothers and was built by ethnic Armenian architect Nikolai Bayev. The project was also funded by the Azeri oil baron Zeynalabdin Taghiyev who challenged the Mailyan brothers in completing the project in a year. If the opera house was completed within a year, he would pay the costs of construction. The opera house was built in 10 months and Taghiev paid as promised.

When first opened in 1911, the theatre was known as the Mailyan Theatre. It is now known as the Azerbaijan State Academic Opera and Ballet Theater and continues to serve Baku residents until this day.

== Philanthropy in Armenia ==
The Mailyan brothers sponsored many projects in the First Republic of Armenia. The most important of which was the financial grant of 2 million rubles in February 1919 to fund the expedition of surveyors for potential industrial output, mineral extracts, soil, and other minerals needed for the reconstruction of the country.

== See also ==
- Armenians in Baku
