= Almasadam Sätqaliev =

Kazakh politician

- Алмасадам Сәтқалиев
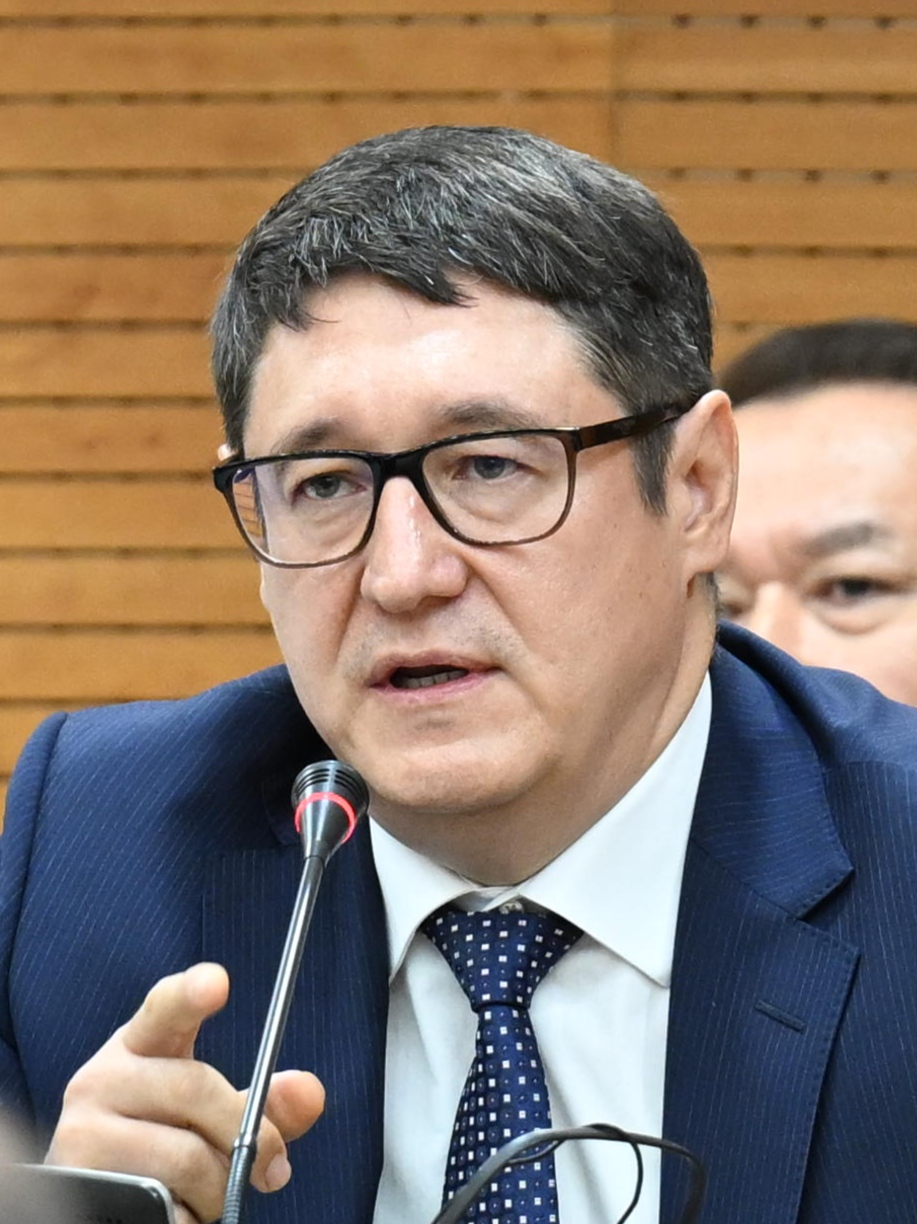
- Sätqaliev in 2023

Chairman of the Agency of the Republic of Kazakhstan for Atomic Energy
- Incumbent
- Assumed office 18 March 2025
- President: Kassym-Jomart Tokayev
- Preceded by: Office established

Minister of Energy
- In office 4 April 2023 – 18 March 2025
- President: Kassym-Jomart Tokayev
- Prime Minister: Älihan Smaiylov; Oljas Bektenov
- Preceded by: Bolat Aqşolaqov
- Succeeded by: Erlan Aqkenjenov

Personal details
- Born: 31 October 1970 (age 55) Alma-Ata, Kazakh SSR, Soviet Union
- Spouse: Marfuga Satkaliyeva
- Children: 5
- Education: Al-Farabi Kazakh National University

Almasadam Maidanūly Sätqaliev (Kazakh: Алмасадам Майданұлы Сәтқалиев, Russian: Алмасадам Майданович Саткалиев; born 31 October 1970) is a Kazakh politician, who serving as the Minister of Energy of Kazakhstan since April 2023. Previously, he served as the chairman of the Samruk-Kazyna from 2021 to 2023.

== Biography ==
Sätqaliev was born in the city of Almaty to Valentina and Maidan Sätqaliev in 1970. He's married to Marfuga Sätqalieva, and has five children (4 sons, 1 daughter).

Sätqaliev is a 1992 graduate of Al-Farabi Kazakh National University with a degree in Mathematical Mechanics, as well as the Russian Presidential Academy of National Economy and Public Administration in 2013, Nazarbayev University in 2015, and Stanford University in 2016.

== Career ==
Sätqaliev career began in 1992 when he founded and led a private company called TOO TaSSaT.

In 1997, he entered the public sector as he joined KazTransOil, national oil transportation company, first as a manager, then as a department head, managing director and VP for Economics.

Between 2001 and 2011, Sätqaliev went from strength to strength as he led AO KEGOC first as CFO and then as president.

From 2012 to 2023, he continued his public service at AO Samruk-Kazyna where he became chairman of the board.

Sätqaliev's first political experience dates back to 2007 when he served as Deputy Minister of Energy and Mineral Resources of the Republic of Kazakhstan. On 4 April 2023, he was appointed Kazakhstan's Minister of Energy.

On 18 March 2025, Sätqaliev was appointed as the chairman of the re-established Agency of the Republic of Kazakhstan for Atomic Energy, which was tasked with issues of uranium mining, the use of nuclear energy, radiation safety, and will the development of the Semipalatinsk nuclear safety zone.

As energy minister, he is overseeing the expansion of non-Russian crude export corridors, specifically boosting shipments via the Baku-Tbilisi-Ceyhan (BTC) pipeline and Trans-Caspian maritime tanker routes."This year, Kazakh oil transported through the BTC pipeline is expected to be around 1.5 million tons. We are evaluating the prospects of increasing this volume to 20 million tons per year in the future."

== Сontroversies ==
In April 2023, just after Almasadam Sätqaliev was appointed Minister of Energy, a photo of his daughter Anadelya and the son of the first President of Kazakhstan, Nursultan Nazarbayev, from his second marriage, Tauman, went viral. Furthermore, the authors of the photo claimed that they were engaged and attending "Haileybury Astana", Kazakhstan's most expensive private school, making them classmates. However, on April 15, 2023, the Ministry of Energy refuted the information.
