= Elmira Abasova =

- Born: January 10, 1932; Baku, Azerbaijan SSR, USSR
- Died: February 12, 2008 (aged 76); Baku, Azerbaijan
- Education: Azerbaijan State Conservatory; Academy of Sciences of the Azerbaijan SSR (PhD)
- Occupations: musician, musicologist, educator, professor
- Political party: Communist Party of the Soviet Union
- Awards: Honored Art Worker of the Azerbaijan SSR
- Scientific career
- Fields: musicology
- Institutions: Azerbaijan State Conservatory; Academy of Sciences of the Azerbaijan SSR

Elmira Abasova (Azerbaijani: Elmira Əbdülhəmid qızı Abasova; 10 January 1932 – 12 February 2009) was an Azerbaijani musicologist, educator, and art historian; professor (1980), and Honored Art Worker of the Azerbaijan SSR (1967). From 1955, she taught at the Azerbaijan State Conservatory and served as its rector from 1977 to 1992. She was the secretary of the Composers Union of Azerbaijan from 1973 to 1990.

== Biography ==
Elmira Abasova was born on 10 January 1932 in Baku, Azerbaijan. In 1955, she graduated from the Historical and Theoretical Faculty of the Azerbaijan State Conservatory, and in 1958 completed her postgraduate studies at the Academy of Sciences of the Azerbaijan SSR. From 1955, she taught at the Azerbaijan State Conservatory.

From 1958, Abasova was a member of the Composers Union of Azerbaijan. From 1962, she served as chair of the music criticism section, and from 1973 to 1990 as secretary of the union. She was also a member of the board of the Union of Soviet Composers.

In 1962, Abasova defended his candidate dissertation on the topic “U. Hajibeyov’s operas and musical comedies” at the Institute of Art of the USSR Academy of Sciences. Since 1963, she worked as a senior researcher at the Institute of Architecture and Art of the Academy of Sciences of the Azerbaijan SSR. She served as an associate professor at the Azerbaijan State Conservatory from 1967 and as a professor from 1980. From 1977 to 1991, she held the position of rector of the conservatory.

She was the author of numerous scholarly studies, monographs, brochures, and articles, primarily devoted to issues of Azerbaijan's musical culture. She studied the creative work of prominent Azerbaijani composers and performers from different generations. Her booklets and scholarly articles in this field, such as “Jovdat Hajiyev”, “Rashid Behbudov”, “Soltan Hajibeyov”, “Said Rustamov”, “Qurban Pirimov”, “Bahram Mansurov”, and others, were published in Baku, Moscow, and various former USSR republics.

A significant part of her academic work focused on the study of the creative legacy of Uzeyir Hajibeyov. She authored the monographs Operas and Musical Comedies of Uzeyir Hajibeyov (1961), The Opera “Koroghlu” by Uzeyir Hajibeyov (1965), Uzeyir Hajibeyov (1975), Uzeyir Hajibeyov: Life and Creative Path (1985), as well as numerous articles on Hajibeyov. She was the responsible editor of the bibliography Uzeyir Hajibeyov (1978).

Elmira Abasova was awarded the honorary title “Honored Art Worker of the Republic of Azerbaijan” in 1967 and was decorated with the Order of the Red Banner of Labour. In 2002, she was awarded the personal scholarship of the president of the Republic of Azerbaijan.

Elmira Abasova passed away on 12 February 2009.
