= Fidan Aghayeva-Edler =

Azerbaijani pianist

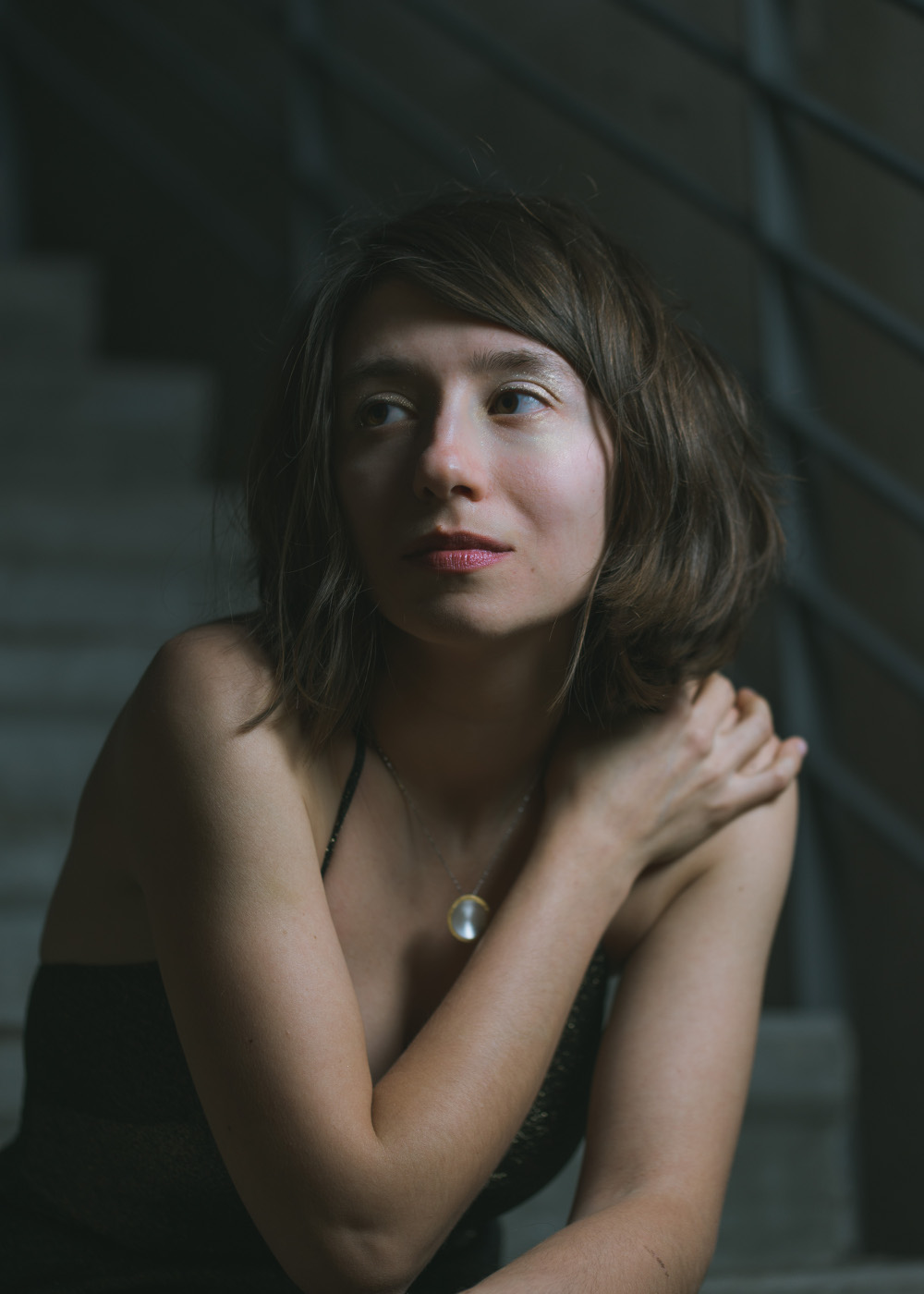

Background information
- Born: Baku, Azerbaijan
- Genres: classical music
- Instrument: Piano
- Years active: 1994–present

Fidan Aghayeva-Edler (born in Baku, Azerbaijan) is an Azerbaijani pianist best known for her modern and contemporary music performances. She supports the performance of female composers.

== Studies ==
She first stood on the concert podium at the age of seven, and at the age of eleven she performed for the first time with a symphony orchestra, with which she performed Mozart's Piano Concerto in D minor. She studied with Oqtay Abaskuliev at the Baku Academy of Music. She completed her master's degree in 2011 with Einar Röttingen at the Griegakademiet in Bergen, Norway. During this time she has developed a greater affinity for the music of Ludwig van Beethoven and Claude Debussy. In 2016 she finished her studies with Jochen Köhler at the Martin Luther University of Halle-Wittenberg, Germany.

== Projects ==
She has performed in "Six pianos" by Steve Reich among others with Post & Mulder (Borealis Festival 2010), and in Makrokosmos by George Crumb at the Moscow Conservatory in 2011.

She was concertmaster of the State Capella Choir in Baku from 2011 to 2012. In 2013 she performed with the Azerbaijan State Chamber Orchestra.

In 2014 she performed one of the parts in a live radio broadcast on MDR Kultur of Simeon ten Holt's "Canto Ostinato" for four pianos.

She has won prizes at international competitions (e.g. Gara Garayev in 1999) and has been a guest at festivals, including the Impuls Festival, Borealis Festival, "Sobiraem Druzey", and the ICPA Festival. With more than 50 performances a year she has built a repertoire encompassing a great variety of composers and stylistic epochs.

In 2019 she performed for the second time at the Berliner Kabarett Anstalt in the context of the series "Unerhörte Musik". The performance was under the title "Zuwanderungen" (immigration) and included exclusively modern works of female composers like Ursula Mamlok, Mayako Kubo, Ruth Zechlin, Verdina Shlonsky, Sarah Nemtsov, Unsuk Chin and others.

In March 2019 her first solo CD "Verbotene Klänge" was released under the label Kreuzberg Records. The production was supported by the Ursula Mamlok foundation.

Her performances have taken her to the Konzerthaus Berlin, Philharmonie Berlin, Grieg Hall, Bergen, Waldbühne Berlin, and the Rachmaninov Hall of the Moscow Conservatory.

== Publications ==
- Vanitas & Seven Sisters (2024)
- Fenster - Genuin (catalog no. GEN22775) (2022)
- The Black Garden (2020)
- Twenty (2020)
- Verbotene Klänge: Sechs Suiten (2019)
- Klavierwerke (2016)
