= Nikolai Bayev =

Armenian architect

- Born: October 6, 1875; Astrakhan, Russian Empire
- Died: August 5, 1952 (aged 76); Yerevan, Armenian SSR, Soviet Union
- Occupations: Architect, civil engineer

Nikolai Georgievich Bayev (Russian: Николай Георгиевич Баев; Armenian: Նիկողայոս Գևորգի Բաև, Nikoghayos Gevorki Bayev; October 6, 1875 – August 5, 1952) was an Armenian architect, who mainly worked in Baku in the 1910s and in Soviet Armenia since the 1920s.

== Biography ==
Baev was born in Astrakhan on September 12, 1875. He was a relative and childhood friend of Mariinsky Opera singer Nadezhda Papayan. He studied in local gymnasium and when studying he also expressed love towards arts, music and painting. Bayev attended the Saint Petersburg Institute of Civil Engineering, from which he graduated in 1901. From 1911 to 1918 he worked as the main architect of Baku. During this period he constructed more than 100 buildings in Baku, including the Great Theatre of the Mailov Brothers (modern days Azerbaijan State Opera Theatre, 1911), Sabunchi Railway Station, a residential sector in the former Ermenikend area of Baku, and other buildings.

In 1927 Bayev moved to Yerevan and from 1929 to 1930 worked as the head of ArmSelStroy (Armenian agency for rural construction), where he constructed about 200 buildings, among them Pioneer's Palace of Yerevan, State Bank of Armenian SSR, Ministry of Justice, Yerevan Mechanical factory, old hall of Sundukyan Theatre, "Ararat" trust buildings, etc. In 1945 he was awarded by the Honorary diploma of the Presidium of the Supreme Soviet of the Armenian SSR.

He was a member of Armenian Union of Architects (1942). Bayev's personal archive (1896-1952) is a part of Yerevan State Archive.

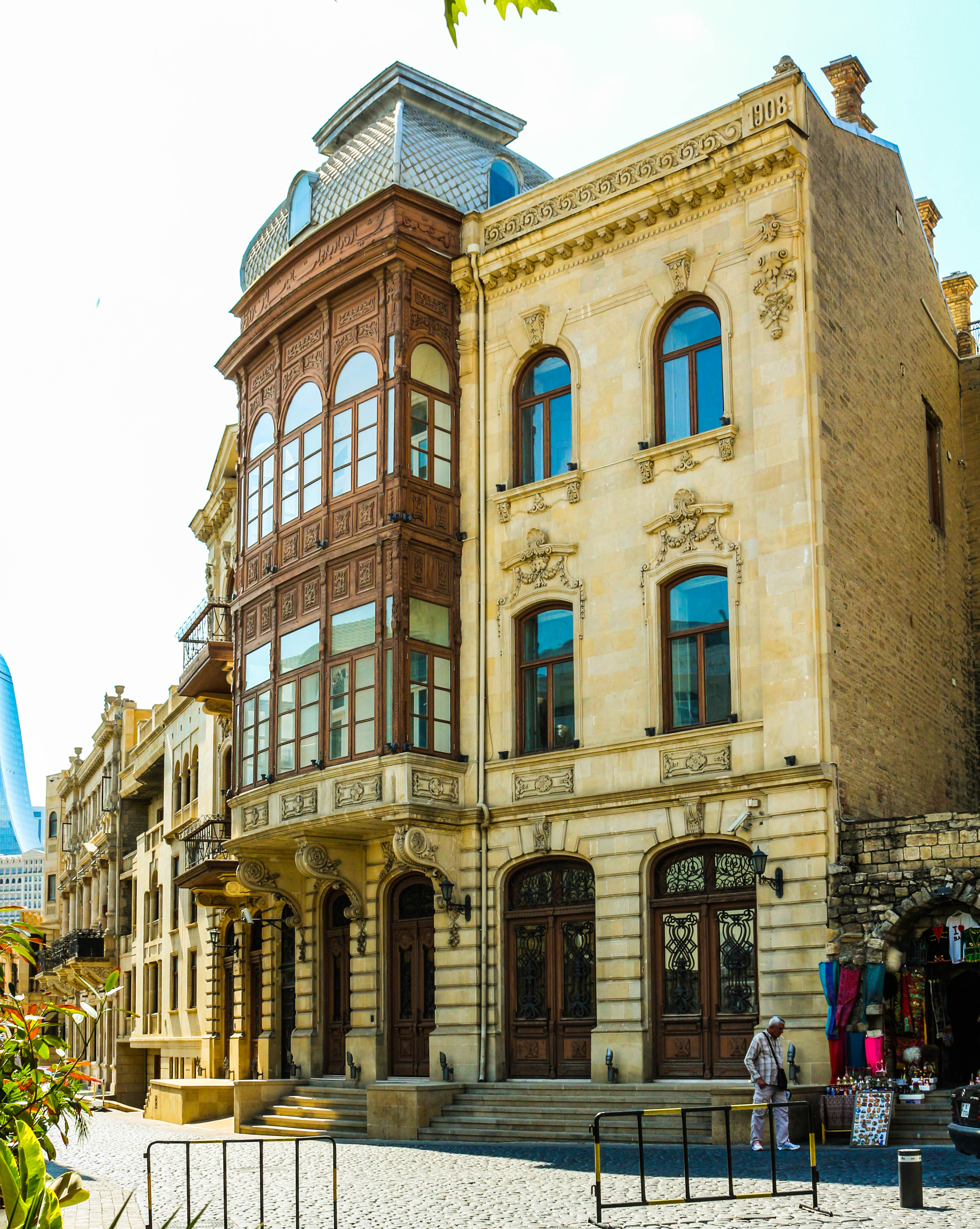
Gani Mammadov Residence

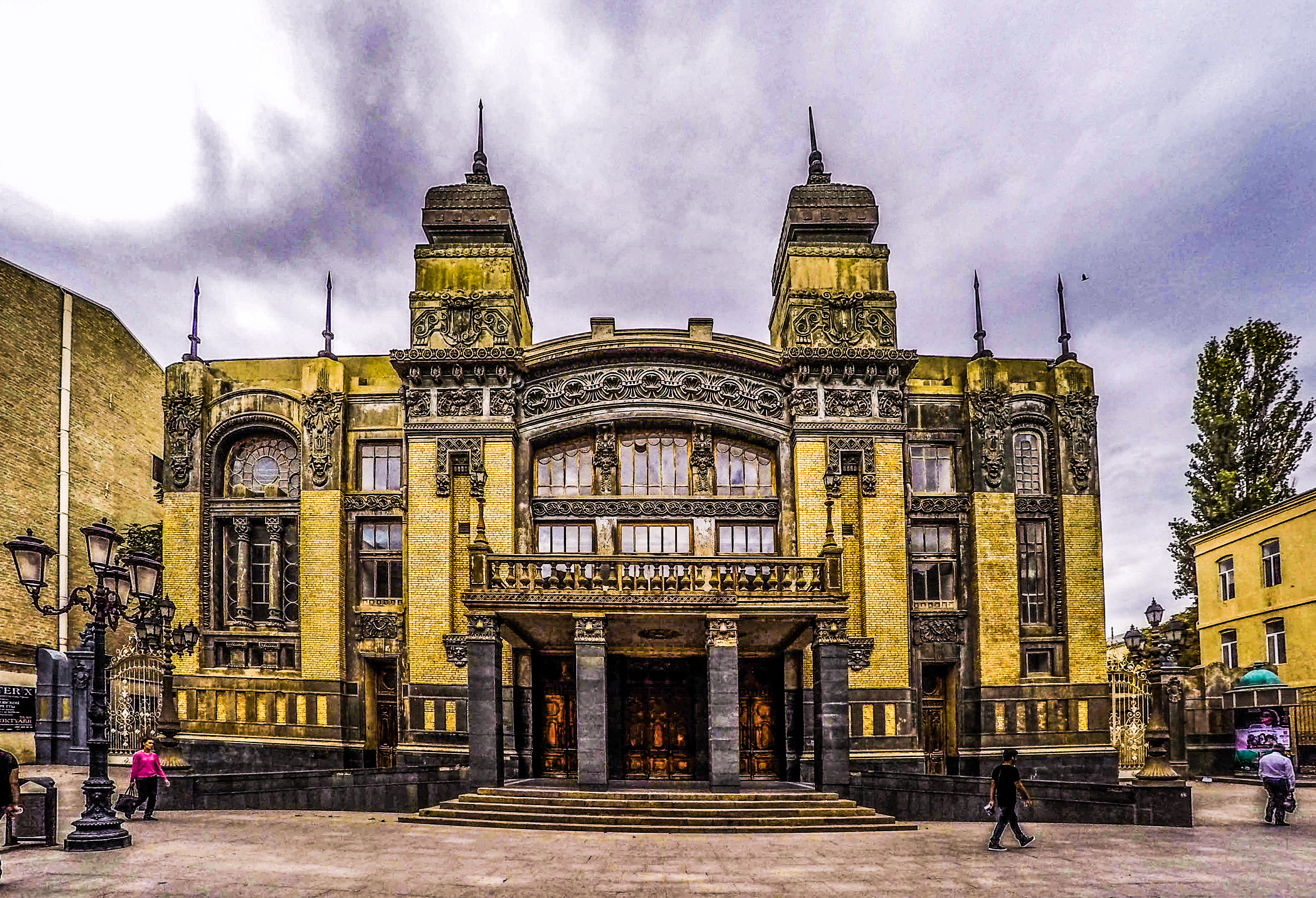
Azerbaijan State Academic Opera and Ballet Theater, 1911

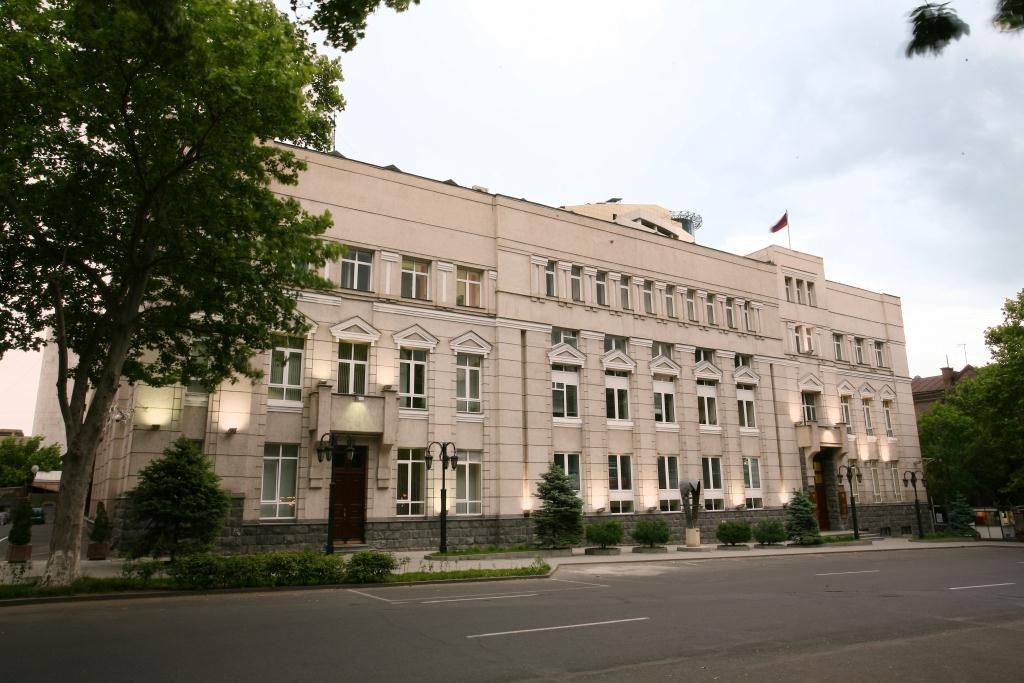
The former State Bank of Armenia building, Yerevan

== Bibliography ==
- Edmond Tigranyan «Activity of Armenian architects in South Caucasus», Yerevan, 2003 - ISBN 978-99930-0-052-5
- (in Russian) Ерканян В.С. Армянская культура в 1800-1917 гг. / Пер. с арм. К.С. Худавердяна. Ер., 1985
- (in Armenian) The Historical-Cultural Heritage of the Armenian Highland, International Conference, Armenia, 2012 / The Role of Armenian Architects in the Formation of Architectural image of City Baku, by Ter-Minasyan A., National Academy of Sciences of the Republic of Armenia, Institute of Arts

== Links ==
- Nikoghayos Baev
- It is a taboo in Azerbaijan that some of best buildings in Baku were constructed by Armenian architects, says Yerevans major architect. Aravot daily, february 2013
