= Podgornoye, Kazakhstan =

Podgornoye
- Village
- Location in Kazakhstan
- Coordinates: 43°19′59″N 79°28′48″E
- Country: Kazakhstan
- Region: Almaty Region
- Time zone: UTC+6 (Omsk Time)

Podgornoye (Kazakh: Подгорное, Podgornoe) is a village in Almaty Region, in south-eastern Kazakhstan.
