= Verdina Shlonsky =

Israeli composer and painter

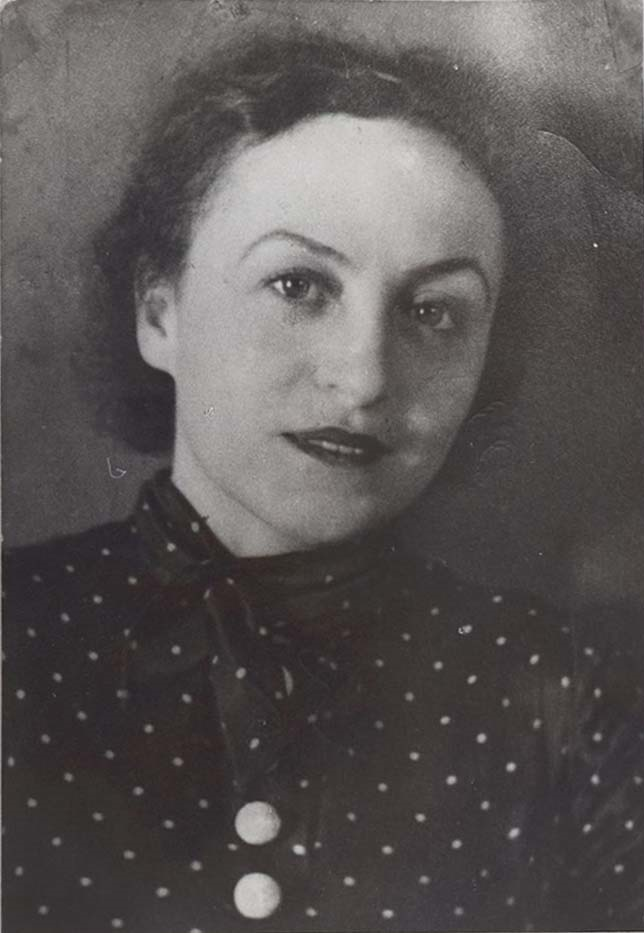
Verdina Shlonsky, Tel Aviv, 1936

Verdina Shlonsky (Hebrew: וורדינה (רוזה) שלונסקי; 22 January 1905 – 20 February 1990) was an Israeli composer, pianist, publicist and painter.

== Biography ==
Verdina (Rosa) Shlonsky was born to a Hasidic Jewish family in Kremenchuk in the Russian Empire, the youngest of six children. (The Hebrew root of the name Verdina is וורד "vered" or "rose".)

The family immigrated to Palestine in 1923, but she remained in Vienna to continue her music education. From there, she moved to Berlin, where she studied with pianists Egon Petri and Artur Schnabel. In Paris, she studied composition with Nadia Boulanger, Edgard Varèse and Max Deutsch. In 1925, she and her sister a successful opera singer Judith Shlonsky (Nina Valery), who had returned to Europe, married two brothers: Sigmund and Alexander Sternik. Both couples soon divorced.

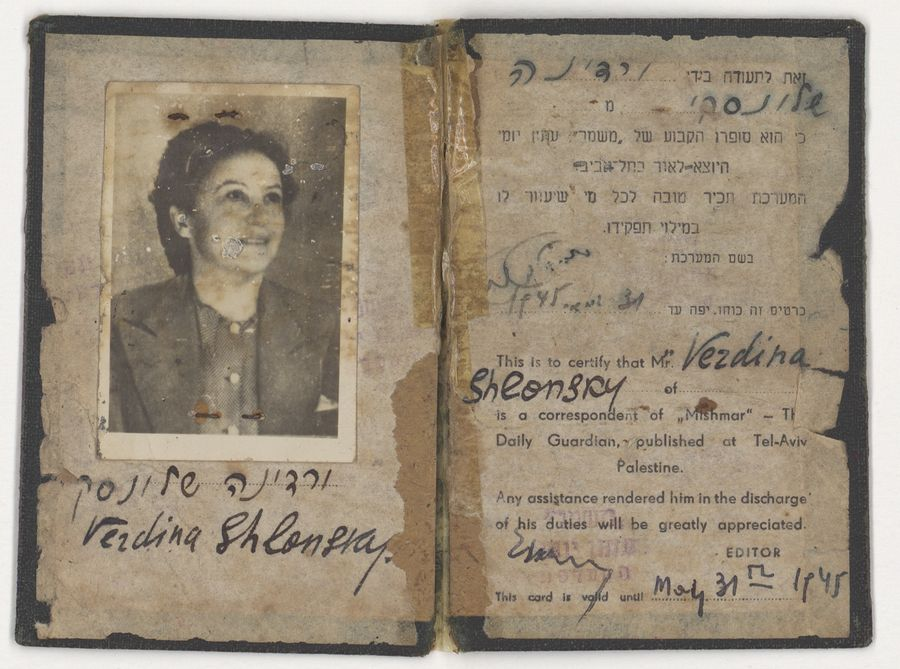
Press card, Al Hamishmar

Her own date of immigration to Palestine is not clear; evidence suggests that she visited Palestine several times since 1929, before finally settling in 1944 or 1945. Upon settling in Palestine, she joined the faculty of the Tel Aviv Academy of Music. Among her noted compositions were "Hebrew Poem" (1931) and "Quartet for Strings", which won an award at the 1948 Béla Bartók Competition in Budapest.

She was the younger sister of poet Avraham Shlonsky, and older sister of the mezzo-soprano Nina Valery.

== Selected recordings ==
- "Pages from the diary" on Verbotene Klänge: Sechs Suiten by Fidan Aghayeva-Edler CD. KR10133. 2019

== See also ==
- Music of Israel
- Journalism in Israel
