= Verena Keller (singer) =

German operatic mezzosoprano (1942–2025)

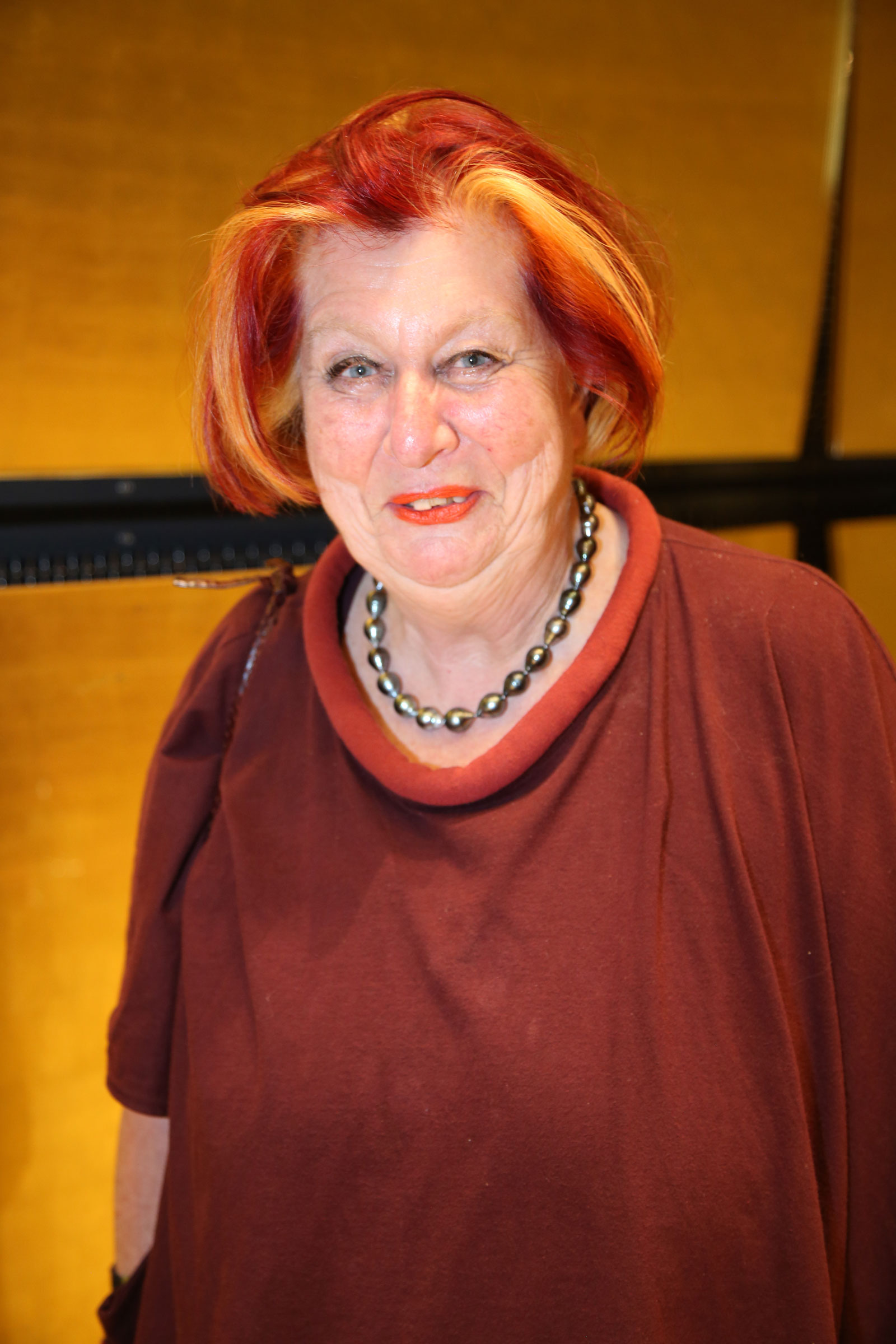
Keller in 2015

Verena Keller (8 September 1942 – 17 December 2025) was a German operatic mezzosoprano.

== Life ==
Keller, born in Schwerin, daughter of the Swiss opera singer Jakob Keller (1911–1992), studied at the University of Music and Performing Arts Vienna and was a lecturer at the Frankfurt University of Music and Performing Arts and the Peter Cornelius Conservatory. Among others, she played in the Grand Théâtre de Genève, the Deutsche Oper Berlin, the Hamburg State Opera, the Opernhaus Düsseldorf, at the Paris Opera, the Teatro Massimo of Palermo, the Teatro di San Carlo of Naples and at the Vancouver Opera.

Keller was awarded the 2002 "Kulturförderpreis" 2002 for her Opernwerkstatt and took part in the documentary Opernfieber by Katharina Rupp (Hessian Film Prize 2005 as best documentary film). Her opera studio took place in Stadtcasino Basel in 2015.

Keller died on 17 December 2025, at the age of 83.

== Repertoire ==
- Wozzeck – Marie
- Il trovatore – Azucena
- Tristan und Isolde – Brangäne
- Jenůfa – Küsterin
- Don Carlos – Eboli
- Un ballo in maschera – Ulrica
- Lohengrin – Ortrud
- Katja Kabanowa – Kabanicha

== Publications ==
- Concerto no. 5 pour piano et orchestre. Ludwig van Beethoven. Berlin, Pool-Musikproduktion, 1998.
- Lirica & l’intimiste. Xavier Delisle. Munich, Koka Media, 1998.
- Messe D-dur op. 86. Antonín Dvořák. Stuttgart, Carus-Verlag, 1987.
- Messe in D-dur Opus 86 für Soli, Chor und Orgel. Antonín Dvořák. Stuttgart, Carus-Verlag, 1976.
