= Ministry of Energy (Kazakhstan) =

Government ministry of Kazakhstan

- Қазақстан Республикасы Энергетика министрлігі (Kazakh); Министерство энергетики Республики Казахстан (Russian)
- Emblem of Kazakhstan

- Office building of the Ministry of Energy

Agency overview
- Formed: 6 August 2014
- Preceding agencies: Ministry of Oil and Gas; Ministry of Industry and New Technologies; Ministry of Environment and Water
- Jurisdiction: Government of Kazakhstan
- Headquarters: Astana, Kazakhstan
- Agency executive: Almassadam Satkaliyev, Minister

The Ministry of Energy of the Republic of Kazakhstan (ME RK, Kazakh: Қазақстан Республикасы Энергетика министрлігі, romanized: Qazaqstan Respublikasy Energetika ministrlıgı, ҚР ЭМ; Russian: Министерство энергетики Республики Казахстан, МЭ РК) is an executive body of the Government of Kazakhstan, which carries out state administration in the field of energy. The Ministry was created during the reorganization of the government on 6 August 2014. The Ministry's functions and powers was from the Ministry of Oil and Gas, Ministry of Industry and New Technologies and the Ministry of Environment and Water.

== Background ==
In 2014, Kazakhstan's energy sector turned to Karim Massimov, then Prime Minister of Kazakhstan, with a request to create a Ministry of Energy, as the situation in the republic with a lack of coordination in the activities of various government bodies in the electric power industry has developed. Prior to the creation of the ministry, various departments dealt with energy issues, which could not cope with their duties.

== Structure ==
=== Departments ===
- Department of Strategic and Information Development;
- Department of Subsoil Use;
- Department of Oil Industry Development;
- Department of Gas and Oil;
- Department of State Control in the Spheres of Hydrocarbons and Subsoil Use;
- Department of Public Policy in the field of electric power industry;
- Department of Atomic Energy and Industry;
- Department of Renewable Energy Sources;
- Department of Environmental Policy and Sustainable Development;
- Department of Climate Policy and Green Technologies;
- Department of Public Policy in Waste Management;
- Department of Internal Audit;
- Department of Budget and Financial Procedures;
- Department of International Cooperation;
- Department of Legal Service;
- Department of Administrative Work;
- Department of Digitalization and Informatization.

=== Administrations ===
- Administration of Staff Development;
- Administration of Mobilization Preparation and Civil Defense;
- Administration of Protection of Public Secrets;
- Administration of Information Security.

=== Committees ===
- Committee of Atomic and Energy Supervision and Control of the Ministry of Energy of the Republic of Kazakhstan;
- Committee of Environmental Regulation and Control of the Ministry of Energy of the Republic of Kazakhstan (transferred to the new ministry).

=== Interregional Department of State Inspection ===
- Western Interregional State Inspection in the oil and gas complex;
- Southern Interregional Office of the State Inspection in the oil and gas complex.
