= Ministry of Ecology and Natural Resources (Kazakhstan) =

Government ministry of Kazakhstan

Ministry of Ecology and Natural Resources of the Republic of Kazakhstan
- Экология және табиғи ресурстар министрлігі
- Emblem of Kazakhstan

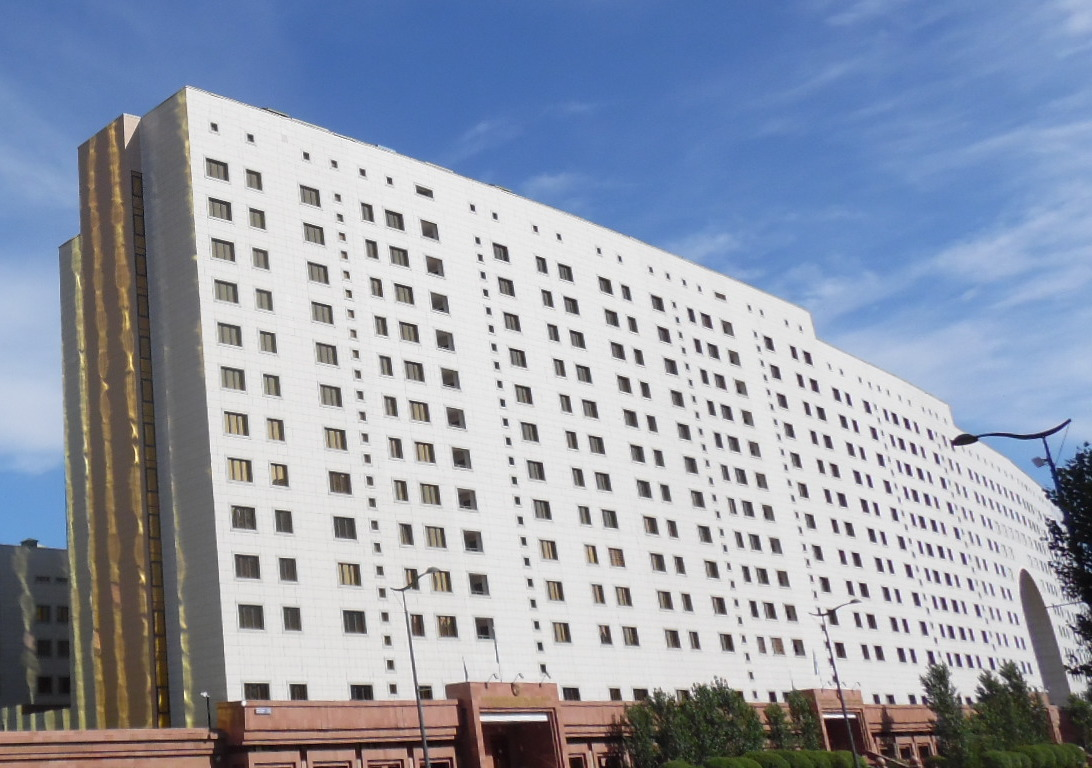
- House of Ministries

Agency overview
- Formed: 17 June 2019
- Jurisdiction: Government of Kazakhstan
- Headquarters: Astana, Kazakhstan
- Agency executive: Älibek Quantyrov, Minister

The Ministry of Ecology and Natural Resources of the Republic of Kazakhstan (MENR RK, Kazakh: Қазақстан Республикасы Экология және табиғи ресурстар министрлігі, ҚР ЭТРМ; Russian: Министерство экологии и природных ресурсов Республики Казахстан, МЭПР РК) is a central executive body of the Government of Kazakhstan, providing leadership in the areas of formation and implementation of state policy, coordination of management processes in the areas of environmental protection, development of the green economy, waste management (excluding municipal, medical and radioactive waste), protection, control and supervision of the rational use of natural resources, the state geological study of the subsoil, the reproduction of the mineral resource base, the use and protection of the water funding, in water supplies, sanitation, forestry, protection, reproduction and use of wildlife and the specially protected areas.

== History ==
Throughout its existence, the agency changed its name and some functions. On 20 December 1990, by the presidential decree “On the Reorganization of Government Agencies in the Kazakh SSR”, the State Committee of the Kazakh SSR on Ecology and Nature Management was formed on the basis of the abolished State Committee of the Kazakh SSR on Nature Protection.

In 1992, the Ministry of Ecology and Bioresources was created by combining the State Committee of the Republic of Kazakhstan on Ecology and Nature Management and the Ministry of Forestry of the Republic of Kazakhstan.

In 1997, by the Decree No. 3655 “On Measures to Further Improve the Efficiency of Public Administration in the Republic of Kazakhstan”, the Ministry of Ecology and Natural Resources was established with the transfer of functions, powers to manage the property and affairs of the abolished Ministry of Ecology and Bioresources to it, as well as parts of the functions, powers to manage property and affairs of the abolished Ministry of Energy and Natural Resources.

On 22 January 1999, by the Decree No. 6 “On the Structure of the Government of the Republic of Kazakhstan”, the Ministry of Natural Resources and Environmental Protection was established with the transfer of functions in the field of forestry, fishing and hunting, water resources, with the exception of land reclamation, irrigation and drainage.

On 28 August 2002, by the Decree No. 931 “On measures to further improve the public administration system of the Republic of Kazakhstan”, the Ministry of Natural Resources and Environmental Protection was reorganized by its transformation into the Ministry of Environmental Protection with the transfer to the Ministry of Agriculture functions and powers in the field of water resources management, forestry, fisheries and hunting.

In 2007, an Environmental Code was adopted. As a result, part of the powers of the Ministry of Environmental Protection was transferred to local executive bodies. In particular, powers were transferred to conduct a state environmental review for a number of business entities. Decree No. 1201 “Issues of the Ministry of Environmental Protection of the Republic of Kazakhstan” from 8 December 2007, reorganized the territorial bodies of the Ministry of Environmental Protection. They were enlarged by merger. The Committee for Environmental Control of the Ministry of Environmental Protection was reorganized into the Committee for Environmental Regulation and Control. State institutions, territorial bodies of the Ministry of Environmental Protection, were reorganized into the territorial bodies of the Committee for Environmental Regulation and Control of the Ministry of Environmental Protection.

On 31 October 2013, the Ministry of Environmental Protection was transformed into the Ministry of Environment and Water Resources with the transfer of functions and powers to it to form and implement state policy in the field of water supply to water users or their associations and its removal for land reclamation purposes from the Ministry of Agriculture; rational and integrated use of groundwater, with the exception of the geological study of subsoil in terms of groundwater, from the Ministry of Industry and New Technologies.

On 6 August 2014, in connection with restructuring state bodies of the Kazakh government, the Ministry of Environment and Water was disbanded and its functions were transferred to the newly created Ministry of Energy and partly to the Ministry of Agriculture.

In 2019, the Ministry was re-established as the Ministry of Ecology, Geology and Natural Resources.

== See also ==
- Aurora Minerals Group
