= Azerbaijan State Academic Opera and Ballet Theater =

Opera house in Baku

- Mailov Theatre
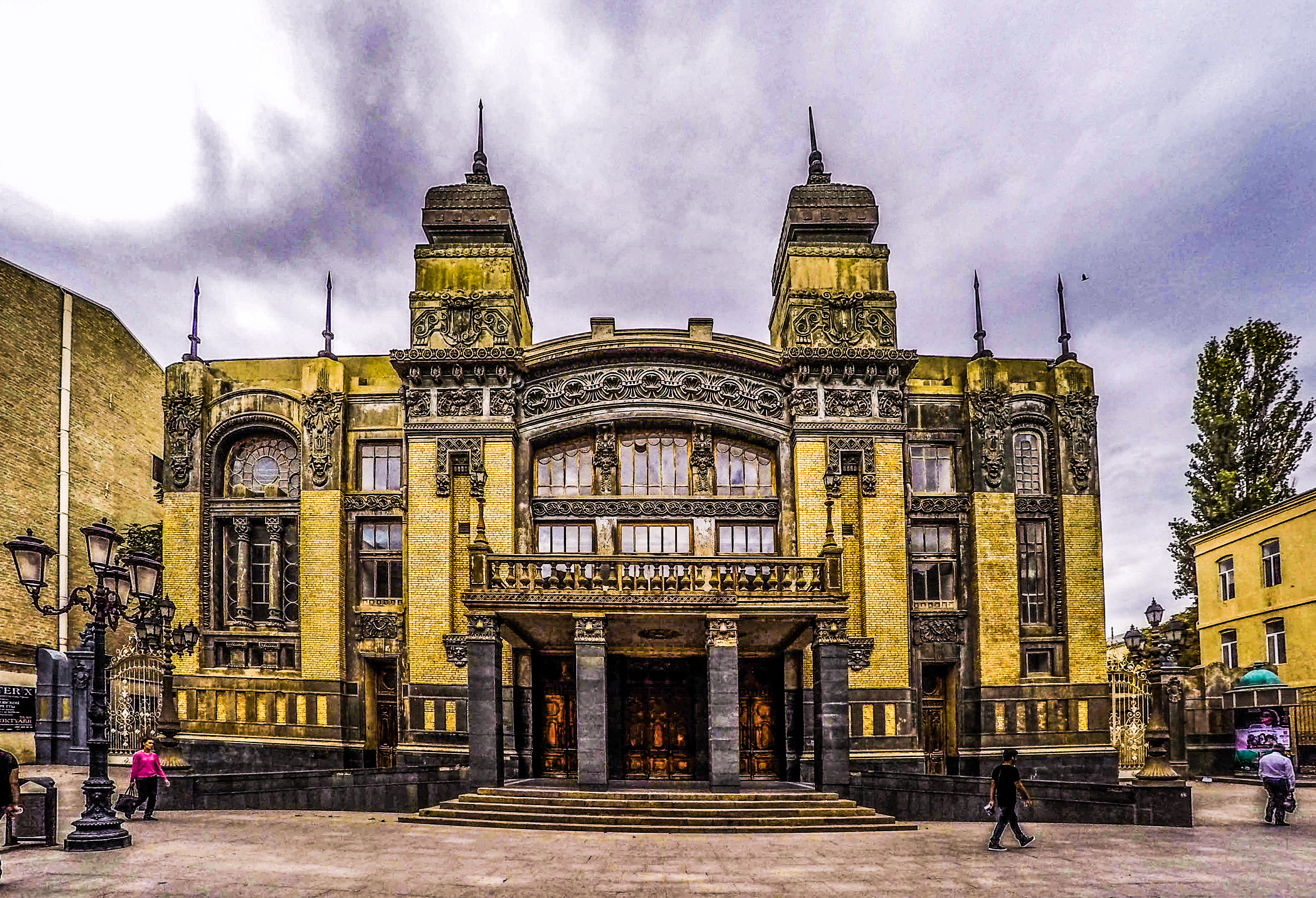
- Interactive map of Azerbaijan State Academic Opera and Ballet Theater
- Address: Nizami küçəsi 95; Baku; Azerbaijan

Construction
- Opened: 28 February 1911
- Years active: 1911-present
- Architect: Nikolai Bayev

Tenants
- Azerbaijan State Academic Ballet; Azerbaijan State Academic Opera

Website
- operabalet.az

The Azerbaijan State Academic Opera and Ballet Theater (Azerbaijani: Azərbaycan Dövlət Akademik Opera və Balet Teatrı) is an opera house in Baku, Azerbaijan. Formerly known as the Mailov Theatre (Azerbaijani: Mayılov Teatrı; Armenian: Մայիլյան թատրոն, romanized: Mayilyan t’atron), was designed in 1911 by Armenian architect Nikolai Bayev at the request of the Armenian magnate Daniel Mailov, one of the Mailov brothers.

== History ==
The theatre was built at the request of magnate Daniel Mailov and funded by magnate Zeynalabdin Taghiyev. In 1910, famous Russian soprano Antonina Nezhdanova visited Baku giving several concerts at various clubs and performance venues. At a ball organized on the occasion of Nezhdanova's departure at the local casino, she was asked whether she would like to visit Baku again. Her response was negative, followed by a concern that in a city of so many wealthy people, no one would fund the construction of a decent opera theatre where singers could fully demonstrate their musical talent. Daniel Mailov who had grown to admire both Nezhdanova's voice and persona during her tour, decided to use this opportunity and offered her to revisit Baku in one year to attend the opening of a new opera theatre, which he would order building in her honour. According to an urban legend, Mailov and his brother were not invited to a housewarming ball of a famous opera singer from Baku whose new house (now the head office of SOCAR) was one of the most outstanding pieces of architecture in the city. The Mailovs therefore decided to erect a building of their own outdoing the "tactless" singer.

The architect and civil engineer of Armenian descent Nikolai Bayev designed the architectural sketch of the theatre. However, the construction of such grandiose building in a year was unheard of at the time and required many safety measures to be taken. The Mailovs decided not to wait for the approval of the City Council but were ordered to stop the construction as it violated building regulations. Soon, Bayev managed to convince the city legislature and received its approval. Azeri magnate Zeynalabdin Taghiyev who had earlier sponsored the construction of the Taghiyev Theatre expressed his doubts that the new theatre could be fully constructed in such a short period of time. Daniel Mailov laid a bet: if the Mailovs did not manage to get the theatre built on time, they would offer it to Taghiyev as a gift; if the theatre was indeed built by 1911, Taghiyev would have to cover all the building expenses. The three-shift work at the site involving 200 workers ensured speedy construction of the building. All works were completed in less than 10 months. The total costs for construction exceeded 250,000 rubles. The city mayor Peter Martynov accompanied by architects and engineers examined the newly built theatre and confirmed its safety. As promised, Taghiyev paid all the expenses. The official opening of the Mailyovs' Theatre was scheduled on 28 February 1911. Daniel Mailov notified Nezhdanova of the ceremony by telegramme beforehand, and the renowned soprano became the first singer to perform at the new opera house. Most of Baku's multiethnic elite attended the event; among the ones not present was the opera singer who had not invited the Mailovs to his housewarming ball.

In 1916, the theatre acquired a resident organization (Pavel Amirago's opera troupe) and began to function on a permanent basis. In 1920, it became a state theatre known as the Opera and Ballet Theatre. In 1925, the Azerbaijani Opera Troupe, the Russian Opera Troupe and the Drama Troupe united to become the official resident organization, and in 1927 the theatre was named after writer Mirza Fatali Akhundov. In 1959, it received the status of an academic theatre.

In 1985, the newly renovated theatre mysteriously burned down. In 1987, all the restoratory works were finished, and the theatre reopened its doors.

Singers who have been associated with the opera company include, Azer Zeynalov, Javid Samadov, and Shovkat Mammadova.

== See also ==
- List of concert halls
