= Nurlan =

- Gender: Male

Origin
- Region of origin: Turkic

Nurlan (Kazakh: Нұрлан) is a masculine given name of Turkic origin. It is most common in Azerbaijan, Kazakhstan, and Uzbekistan. The name is essentially a combination of the Arabic word Noor (also spelled as "Nur") meaning light, ray, or shine and the Turkic word "Lan/Ulan" which means lion in most Turkic languages. Thus, the name itself can be translated into "radiant lion". Notable people with the name include:

== Given name ==
- Nurlan Äbdirov (born 1961), Kazakh politician
- Nurlan Abilmazhinuly (born 1962), Chinese politician
- Nurlan Aldabergenov (born 1962), Kazakh politician
- Nurlan Äuesbaev (born 1957), Kazakh politician
- Nurlan Baibazarov (born 1975), Kazakh politician and economist
- Nurlan Balgimbayev (1947–2015), Kazakh politician
- Nurlan Dombayev (born 1981), Kazakh para-taekwondo practitioner
- Nurlan Dulatbekov (born 1962), Kazakh scientist and academic
- Nurlan Iskakov (born 1963), Kazakh politician
- Nurlan Kapparov (1970–2015), Kazakh politician and businessman
- Nurlan Koizhaiganov (born 1977), Kazakh Greco-Roman wrestler
- Nurlan Koyanbayev (born 1979), Kazakh filmmaker, television personality, and actor
- Nurlan Mendygaliyev (born 1961), Kazakh water polo player
- Nurlan Motuev (1969–2026), Kyrgyz politician
- Nurlan Myrzabayev (born 1992), Kazakh taekwondo practitioner
- Nurlan Nigmatulin (born 1962), Kazakh politician
- Nurlan Nogaev (born 1967), Kazakh politician
- Nurlan Novruzov (born 1993), Azerbaijani footballer
- Nurlan Orazbayev (born 1968), Kazakh ice hockey player
- Nurlan Ormanbetov (born 1962), Kazakh army officer
- Nurlan Saburov (born 1991), Kazakh stand-up comedian
- Nurlan Sauranbaev (born 1967), Kazakh politician
- Nurlanbek Turgunbek uulu (born 1977), Kyrgyz politician
- Nurlan Yermekbayev (born 1963), Kazakh politician and diplomat

== See also ==
- Nur Land
- Nuran (disambiguation)
- Nurla
