= Nuran =

Nuran (also Romanized as Nouran, Nooran, Noran, Nuraan, Noraan, Nooraan, and Nourane, Arabic and Persian: نوران) may refer to:

== People ==
=== Given name ===
- Nouran El Torky (born 1992), Egyptian squash player
- Nourane Fotsing Moluh Hassana (born 1987), Cameronian entrepreneur and politician
- Nouran Gohar (born 1997), Egyptian squash player
- Nuran İmir (born 1977), Kurdish politician
- Nuraan Muller, South African politician
- Nuran Nabi (born 1949), Bangladeshi scientist and author
- Nuran Pelikyan (born 1967), Bulgarian wrestler
- Nouran Saleh (born 1988), Egyptian synchronized swimmer
- Nuran Evren Şit (born 1980), Turkish screenwriter
- Nouran Sharaf (born 1985), Egyptian volleyball player
- Nuran Tanrıverdi, Turkish architect and painter

=== Surname ===
- Sultana Nooran (born 1992) and Jyoti Nooran (born 1994), collectively known as the Nooran Sisters, Indian sororal singing duo
- Rüştü Nuran (born 1976), Turkish basketball referee and surgeon

== Places ==
- Nuran, Azerbaijan
- Nuran, Ardabil, Iran
- Nuran, Khuzestan, Iran

== Other ==
- Nooran, a 1957 Pakistani Punjabi-language musical romance film
