= Chet (murza) =

Tatar murza

- Murza
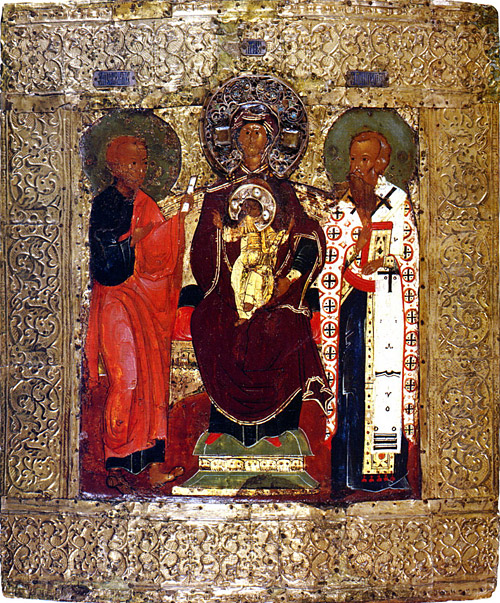
- A vision of Virgin Mary to Zachary Chet, 16th-century Russian icon

Chet (baptized as Zachary) was a murza of the Golden Horde and the legendary progenitor of a number of Russian noble families, including the Godunov, Saburov and Veliaminov-Zernov families. He also was the founder of the Ipatievsky Monastery.

== Life and historiography ==
According to the legend, Chet received estates near Kostroma in 1330 during the reign of Ivan I of Moscow and was baptized as Zachary. He also had a vision of the Virgin Mary with prestanding Philip the Apostle and hieromartyr Hypatius of Gangra, which resulted in his healing from sickness. In gratitude for his healing, Hypatian Monastery was established there.

According to the Russian historian Stepan Veselovsky, the legend appeared only at the end of the 16th century and has serious chronological issues. The historian claims that the Zachary clan is a native Kostroma clan. In his opinion, Zachary lived in the second half of the 13th century and had a son named Aleksandr (d. 1304). The first representative of the family who served Moscow was a grandchild of Zachary called Dmitriy Aleksandrovich Zerno. The Hypatian Monastery was founded at the end of the 13th century and was originally a hereditary monastery located in Zachary's estates.

An alternative version of a Russian origin was presented by another Russian historian, Maksim Yemelyanov-Lukyanchikov. He believes that Zachary Chet was an ancient boyar clan that served Daniel of Galicia and appeared in Kostroma at the end of the 13th century. Presumably, he was the one who brought the Hypatian Codex, which later was found in the Hypatian Monastery.

Zachary and Aleksandr were both buried in the Hypatian Monastery.
