= Zərqava =

Zərqava or Zarqava may refer to:

- Zərqava, Agsu, Azerbaijan
- Zərqava, Quba, Azerbaijan
