= Aleksandr Sergeyevich Trofimov =

Russian artist

Aleksandr Trofimov
- Алекса́ндр Серге́евич Трофи́мов
- Born: 11 February 1927; Moscow, Soviet Union
- Died: 10 April 2000 (aged 73)
- Education: Moscow Surikov State Academic Institute of Fine Arts
- Known for: landscape art
- Awards: Distinguished Artist of the RSFSR

Aleksandr Sergeyevich Trofimov, (Russian: Алекса́ндр Серге́евич Трофи́мов; 11 February 1927 – 10 April 2000), was a Soviet and Russian painter, art critic, and art historian. Professor at Moscow Surikov State Academic Institute of Fine Arts. A member of the Moscow Artists Union.

== Biography ==
Aleksandr Trofimov was born in 1927 in Moscow. He attended the Moscow secondary school of Arts; in 1946–1952, studied in Surikov institute. After graduating from the institute, he worked as an artist at VDNKh for two years. Later Trofimov was hired by the State Historical Museum and stayed there about a year. Between 1955 and 1958 he worked as an artist at the Museum of Moscow.

=== Career in arts education ===
About 7,5 years he worked as a teacher at the People Correspondence university of Arts in Moscow, later – as an assistant professor and docent at the Moscow State Textile University. From 1978 to 1994 Trofimov held the positions of docent (since 1986, of professor) at Surikov institute, department of painting and composition, and of prorector on research work. In 1994, he became prorector on research and educational work at the Russian Painting, Sculpture, and Architecture academy.

== Works ==
=== Selected exhibitions ===
- 1943: The Young Artists exhibition, dedicated to the 25th Anniversary of Komsomol (Tretyakov Gallery, Moscow)
- 1955: The First exhibition of Studies by the Young Artists from Moscow (CDRI, Moscow)
- 1958: The Fourth exhibition of works by the Young Artists from Moscow.

=== Albums, selected works (painting) ===
The painter created a series of landscapes based on twelve pieces by Tchaikovsky, The Seasons. Some works of the series were published as a set of cards by the publishing house Izobrazitelnoe Iskusstvo. The same publisher issued a set of cards depicting some of his works dedicated to Leo Tolstoy.

- А. Трофимов (1976). А. Тюрин (ed.). Мелодии родного края [Melodies of the native land] (in Russian). М.: Изобразительное искусство.
- А. Трофимов (1978). А. Тюрин (ed.). Там, где жил и работал Л. Н. Толстой [There lived and worked Leo Tolstoy] (in Russian). М.: Изобразительное искусство.

Trofimov's paintings, articles on his works were published by such prominent publishers as Sovietski khudozhnik, Pravda, Izvestia.

== Publications by Trofimov ==
=== Books ===
Aleksandr Trofimov wrote the book about the Russian painter Semyon Grigorievich Mukhin (1891–1972):

- Трофимов А. С. (1986). Семён Григорьевич Мухин [Semyon Grigorievich Mukhin] (in Russian). Л.: Художник РСФСР.

=== Articles ===
A number of articles by A. Trofimov, dedicated to Russian artists, to historical monuments and landmarks of Russia, appeared in such magazines as Khudozhnik (1991, 1995, 1996), Iuny Khudozhnik (1999), Slovo (1997), Moskva (1998, 1999).

== Public life ==
A. Trofimov was an active member of VOOPIiK, Society for the Protection of Historical and Cultural Monuments, and became the Chairman of the Presidium of its Moscow branch in 1987. He successfully withstood some plans about the demolition of historical buildings in the centre of Moscow. Yuri Bychkov mentions him as a long-time collaborator and associate of Pyotr Baranovsky.

Trofimov participated in preparations for reconstruction of Kazan Cathedral in Moscow.

He was elected deputy to the Mossovet of the 20th convocation.
