= March 31 (Eastern Orthodox liturgics) =

Day in the Eastern Orthodox liturgical calendar

Eastern Orthodox liturgical calendar
March 30	March 31	April 1
March 31 O.S. ≍ April 13 N.S. March 31 N.S ≍ March 18 O.S.

An Eastern Orthodox cross

March 31 in Eastern Orthodox liturgical calendars is a feast day and a day of commemoration of saints and martyrs. Although some Orthodox churches use the Revised Julian Calendar and others use the traditional Julian calendar, the fixed commemorations for their respective March 31 are broadly the same, no matter which calendar is used. (Note: Despite the dates being the same, the days to which they refer typically differ by 13 days. The notation Old Style or O.S. is sometimes used to indicate a date in the traditional Julian Calendar (the "Old Calendar"). The notation New Style or N.S. indicates a date in the Revised Julian calendar (the "New Calendar").)

== Saints ==
- Righteous Joseph the Fair (the All-Comely), son of Jacob, Patriarch (c. 1700 BC)
- Saint Acacius the Confessor, Bishop of Melitene in Pisidia (251)
- Saint Hypatius the Wonderworker, Bishop of Gangra (326) (see also: November 16)
- Theophilos the Martyr, and those with him, in Crete.
- Martyrs Menander and Sabinus, and another 38 martyrs, in Hermopolis of Egypt, under Julian the Apostate (c. 361-363)
- Saint Apollonius (Apollo) of the Thebaid, ascetic (4th century)
- Hieromartyrs Abdas, Bishop of Hormizd-Ardashir, and the Deacon Benjamin, of Persia (c. 424) (Note: "In Persia, during the reign of king Isdegerdes, St. Benjamin, deacon. Because he would not cease to preach the word of God, sharp-pointed reeds were forced under his nails, a thorny stake driven through his entrails; and thus he consummated his martyrdom.") (see also: May 16 and March 12)
- Saint Hypatius, Abbot of Rufinus in Chalcedon (446)
- Venerable Blaise of Amorium and Mount Athos (c. 909)
- Venerable Stephen the Wonderworker, ascetic.

== Pre-Schism Western saints ==
- Saint Balbina of Rome (c. 130) (Note: By tradition the daughter of Quirinus the martyr, she was baptised by Pope Alexander and lived as a virgin in Rome. She was buried on the Appian Way near her father. Later her relics were enshrined in the church dedicated to her on the Aventine.)
- Martyrs Theodulus, Anesius, Felix, Cornelia and Companions, in North Africa.
- Saint Renovatus, Abbot of Cauliana in Lusitania, then Bishop of Merida in Spain for twenty-two years (c. 633)
- Saint Aldo, Abbot of Hasnon Abbey (fr) in Belgium (8th century) (Note: Count of Ostrevant, he became a monk at the monastery of Hasnon in Belgium, which had been founded by his brother John. Aldo was chosen as second abbot.)
- Saint Guy (Guido) (1046) (Note: Born near Ravenna in Italy, Guy became a monk at the monastery of St Severus, where he became abbot. Later he went to the monastery of Pomposa near Ferrara.)

== Post-Schism Orthodox saints ==
- Saint Hypatius the Healer, of the Kiev Caves (14th century)
- Saint Ivan I of Moscow (John I Daniilovich Kalita), Prince of Moscow from 1325 and Grand Prince of Vladimir from 1328 (1340)
- Saint Jonah, Metropolitan of Kiev, Moscow, and all Russia (1461)
- Saint Philaret, Abbot of Glinsk Hermitage (1841)
- Saint Innocent, Metropolitan of Moscow, Enlightener of Siberia and Alaska (1879)

=== New martyrs and confessors ===
- New Hieromartyr John Blyumovich, Priest (1938)

== Other commemorations ==
- Appearance of the Iveron Icon of the Most Holy Theotokos, on Mt. Athos ("Panagia Portaitissa" or "Gate-Keeper") (late 10th century) (see also: February 12)
- Repose of Archbishop Averky (Taushev) of Syracuse and Holy Trinity Monastery (1976)
- Repose of Schemanun Anastasia (Shevelenko) of Karaganda (1977)
- Repose of Archimandrite Thaddeus (Strabulovich) of Vitovnica Monastery (Tadej Štrbulović), Serbia (2003)

== Icon gallery ==
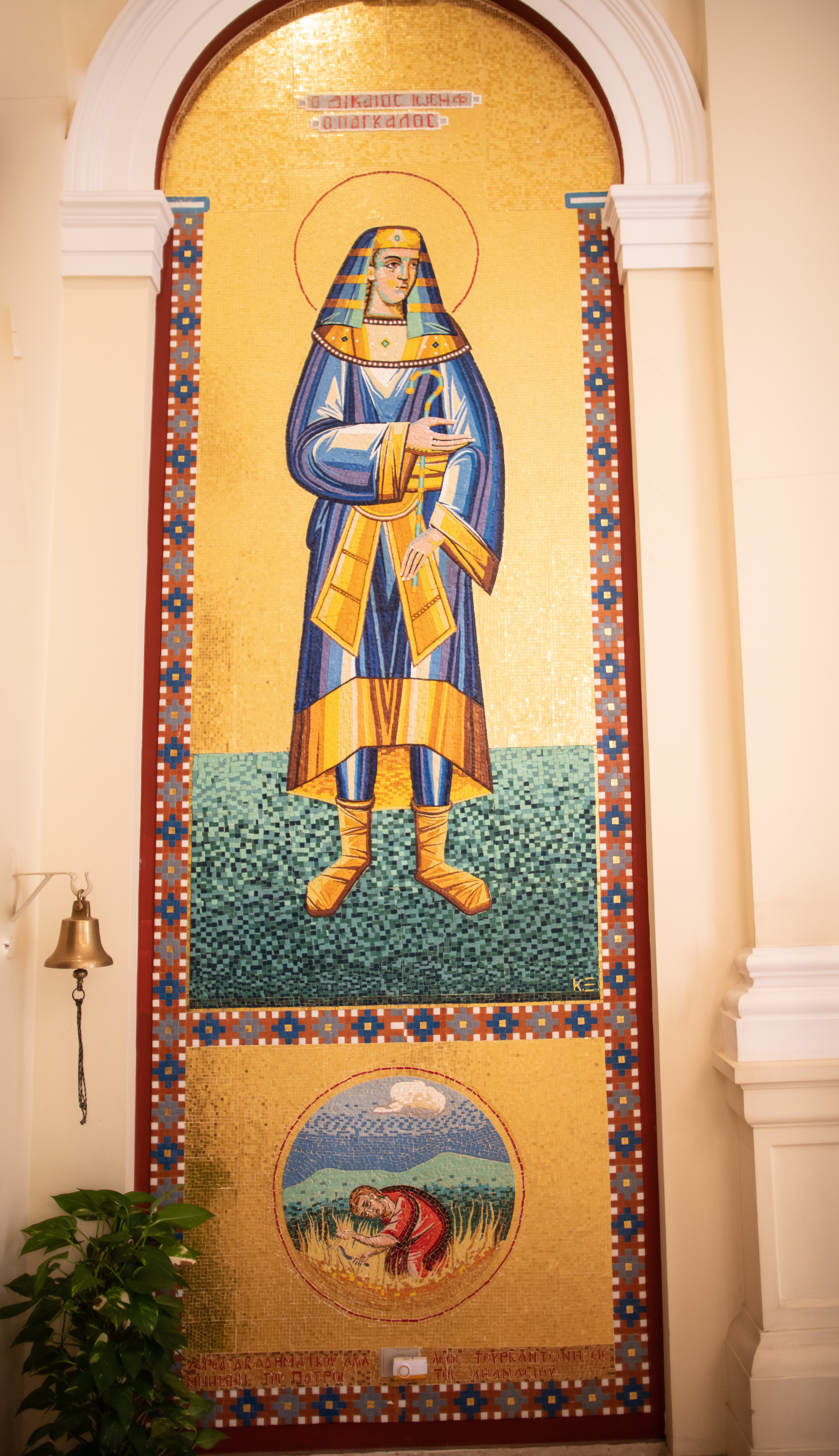
Righteous Joseph the Fair. (Cathedral of the Annunciation, Alexandria, Egypt.)

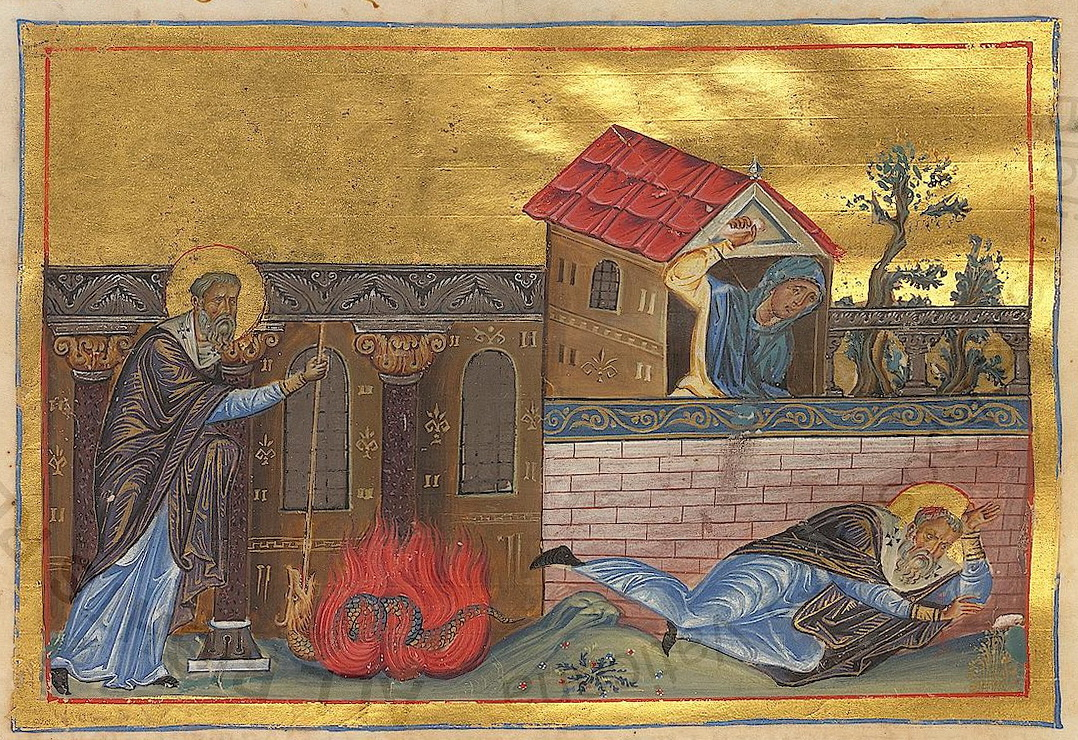
St Hypatius the Wonderworker of Gangra (Menologion of Basil II)

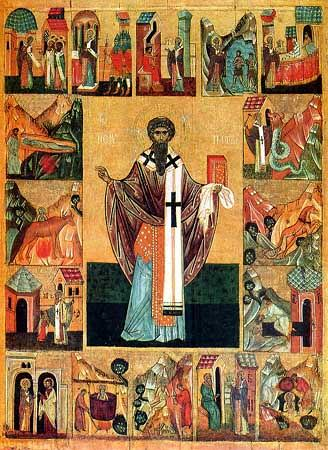
A 15th-century Russian icon of St. Hypatius (Hypatian Monastery).

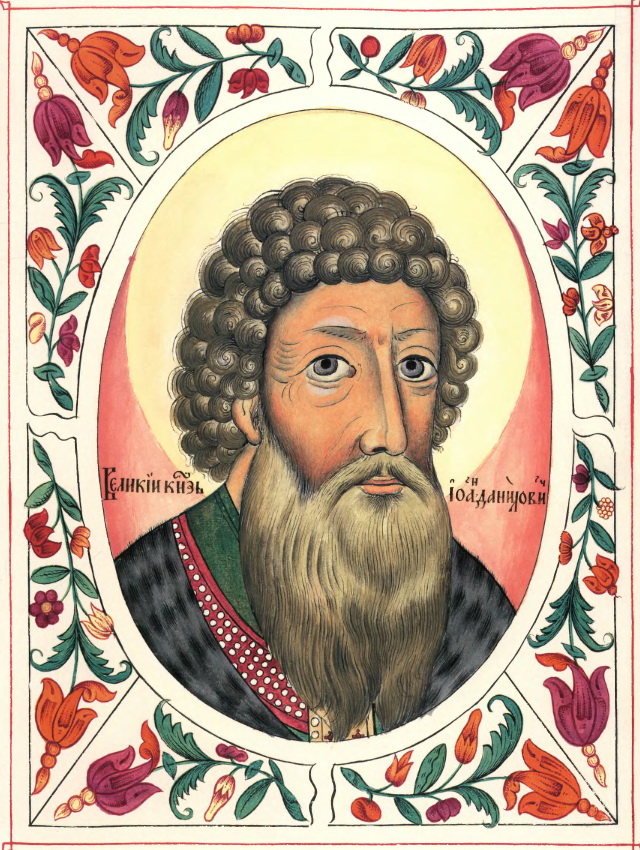
St. Ivan Kalita.

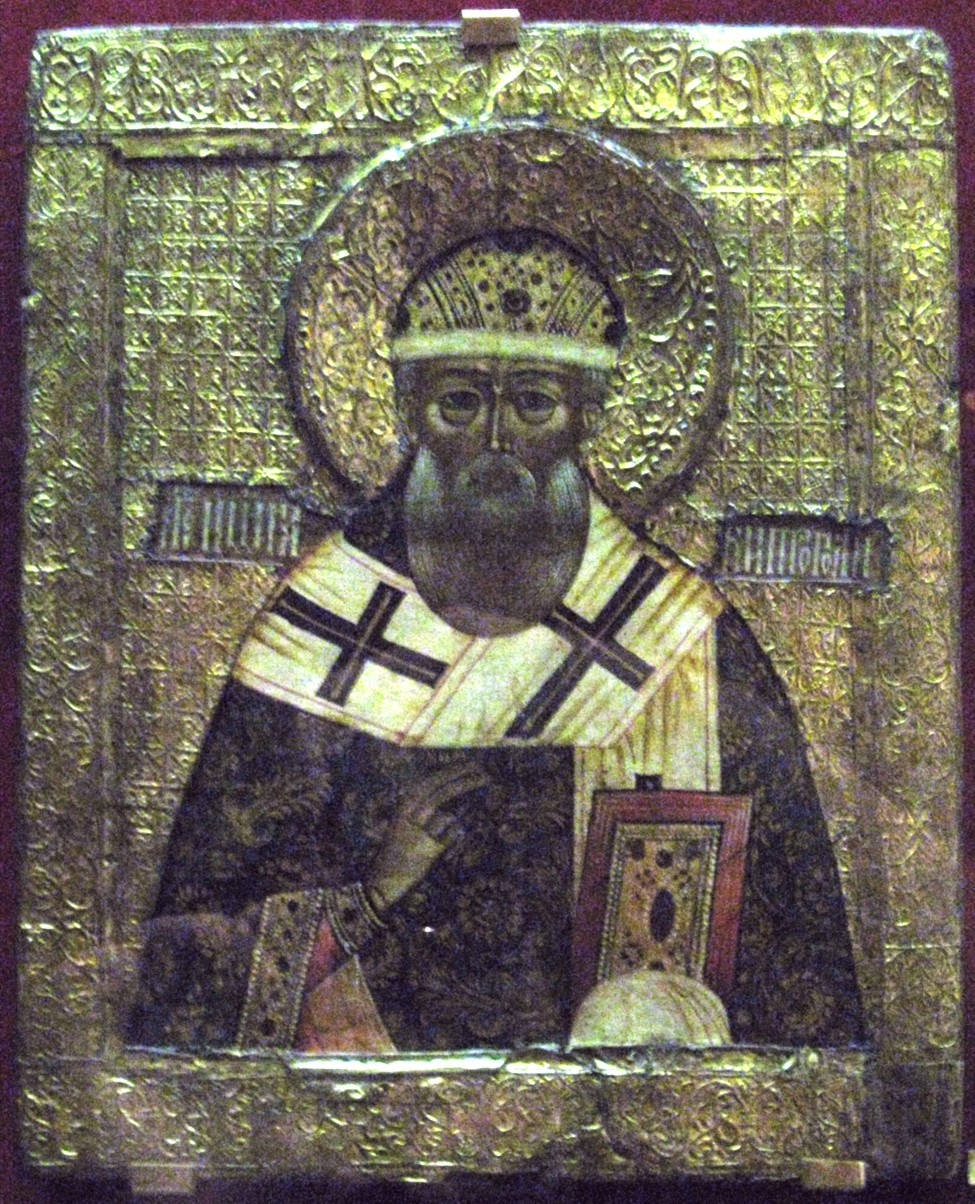
St. Jonah of Moscow

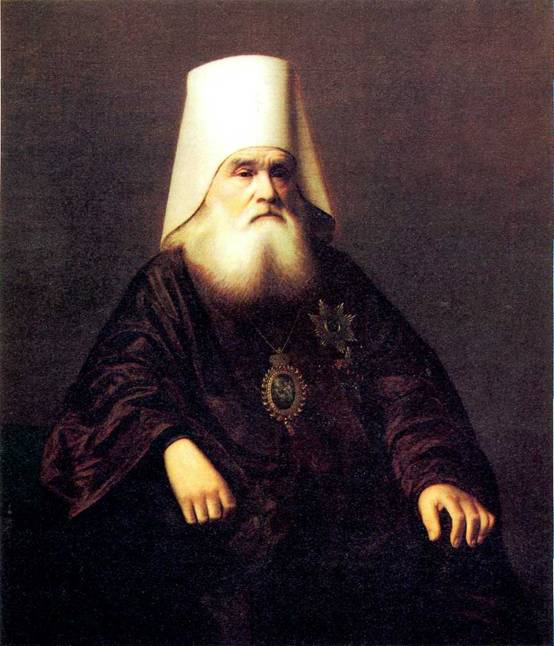
St. Innocent as Metropolitan of Moscow.

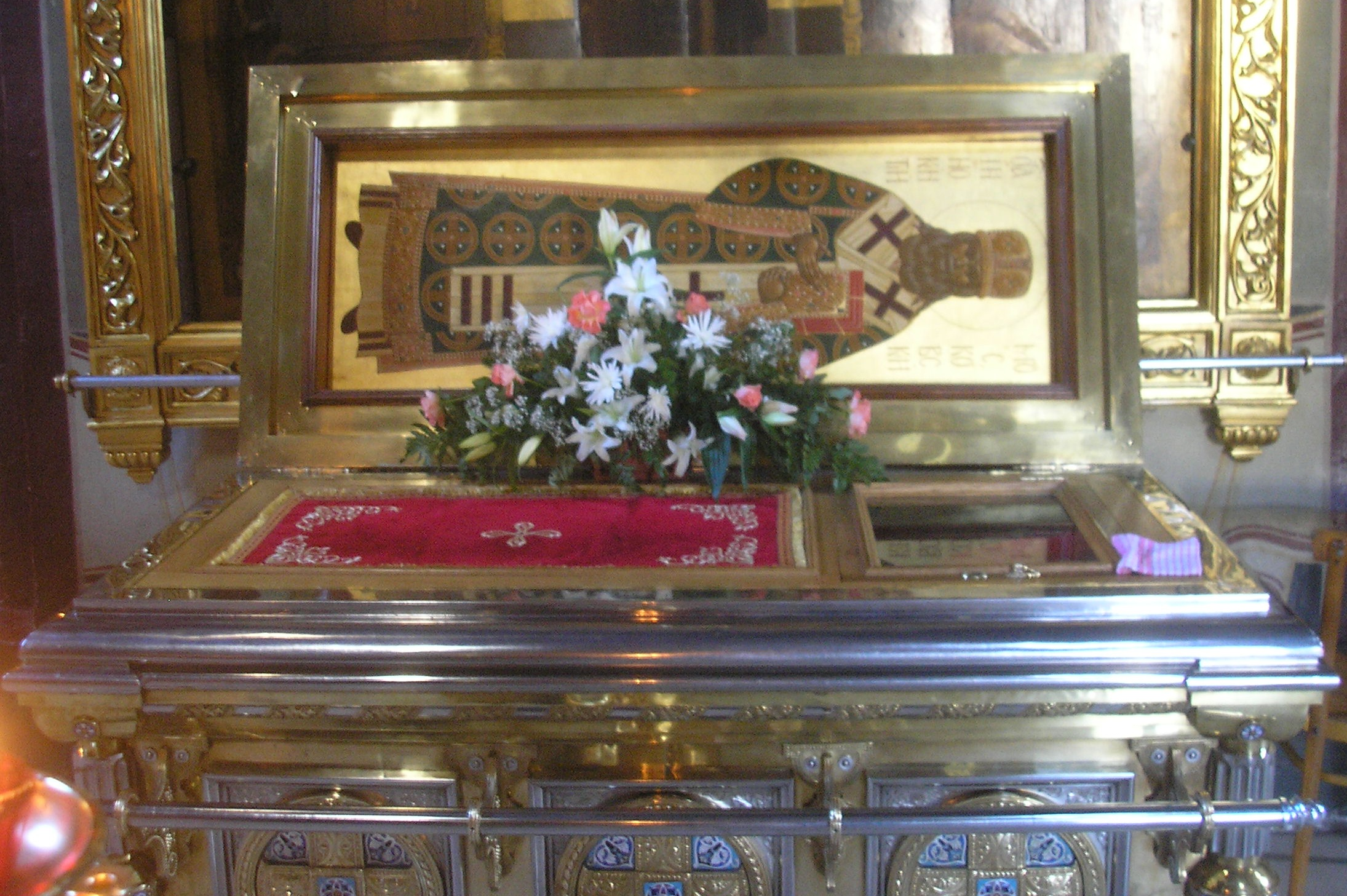
The Relics of Saint Innocent of Alaska, in the Assumption Cathedral at the Trinity-Sergius Monastery in Sergiev Posad, Russia.

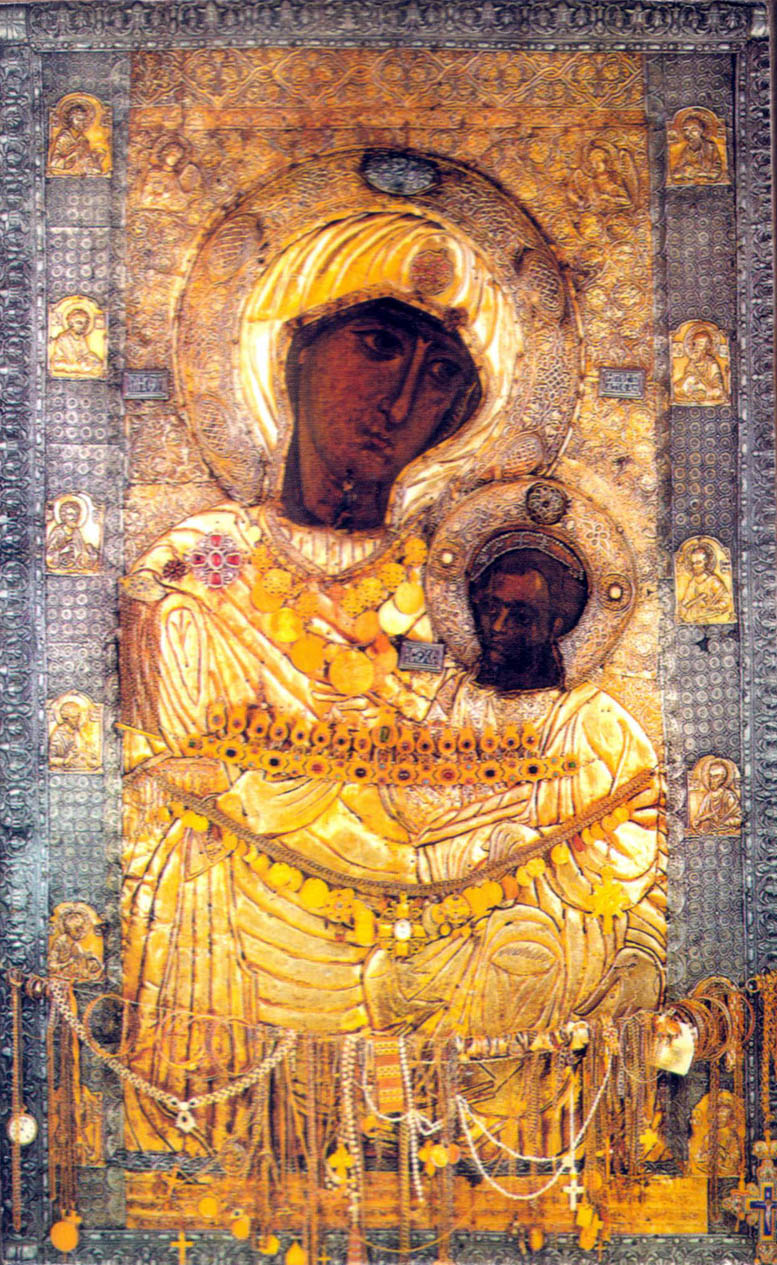
Our Lady of Iveron, Mount Athos, Greece.

== Sources ==
- March 31/April 13. Orthodox Calendar (PRAVOSLAVIE.RU).
- April 13 / March 31. HOLY TRINITY RUSSIAN ORTHODOX CHURCH (A parish of the Patriarchate of Moscow).
- March 31. OCA - The Lives of the Saints.
- The Autonomous Orthodox Metropolia of Western Europe and the Americas (ROCOR). St. Hilarion Calendar of Saints for the year of our Lord 2004. St. Hilarion Press (Austin, TX). p. 25.
- March 31. Latin Saints of the Orthodox Patriarchate of Rome.
- The Roman Martyrology. Transl. by the Archbishop of Baltimore. Last Edition, According to the Copy Printed at Rome in 1914. Revised Edition, with the Imprimatur of His Eminence Cardinal Gibbons. Baltimore: John Murphy Company, 1916. pp. 91-92.

Greek Sources

- Great Synaxaristes: (in Greek) 31 ΜΑΡΤΙΟΥ. ΜΕΓΑΣ ΣΥΝΑΞΑΡΙΣΤΗΣ.
- (in Greek) Συναξαριστής. 31 Μαρτίου. ECCLESIA.GR. (H ΕΚΚΛΗΣΙΑ ΤΗΣ ΕΛΛΑΔΟΣ).

Russian Sources

- (in Russian) April 13 (March 31). Православная Энциклопедия под редакцией Патриарха Московского и всея Руси Кирилла (электронная версия). (Orthodox Encyclopedia - Pravenc.ru).
- (in Russian) 31 марта (ст.ст.) 13 апреля 2013 (нов. ст.). Русская Православная Церковь Отдел внешних церковных связей. (DECR).
