= Golden Ring of Russia =

Region in Russia

Moscow and the cities of Golden Ring on a map of Central Federal District of Russia

The Golden Ring of Russia (Russian: Золотое кольцо России, romanized: Zolotoye koltso Rossii) unites old Russian cities of five Oblasts – usually excluding Moscow – as a well-known theme-route. The grouping is centred northeast of the capital in what was the north-eastern part of ancient Rus'. The ring formerly comprised the region known as Zalesye. The idea of the route and the term was created in 1967 by Soviet historian and essayist Yuri Bychkov, who published in Sovetskaya Kultura in November–December 1967 a series of essays on the cities under the heading: "Golden Ring". Bychkov was one of the founders of ВООПИК: the All-Russian Society for the Protection of Monuments of History and Culture (these letters in Romanized form are VOOPIK).

These ancient towns were heavily formative to the centrality of the Russian Orthodox Church in society. They preserve the memory of key events in medieval and Imperial Russian history. The towns have been called "open-air museums" and feature unique monuments of Russian architecture of the 12th–18th centuries, including kremlins, monasteries, cathedrals, and churches. These towns are among the most picturesque in Russia and prominently feature Russia's onion domes.

The Golden Ring of Russia includes: Vladimir - Suzdal - Ivanovo - Kostroma - Yaroslavl - Rostov Veliky - Pereslavl-Zalessky - Sergiev Posad

== Cities included ==
Examples of landmarks within the Golden Ring
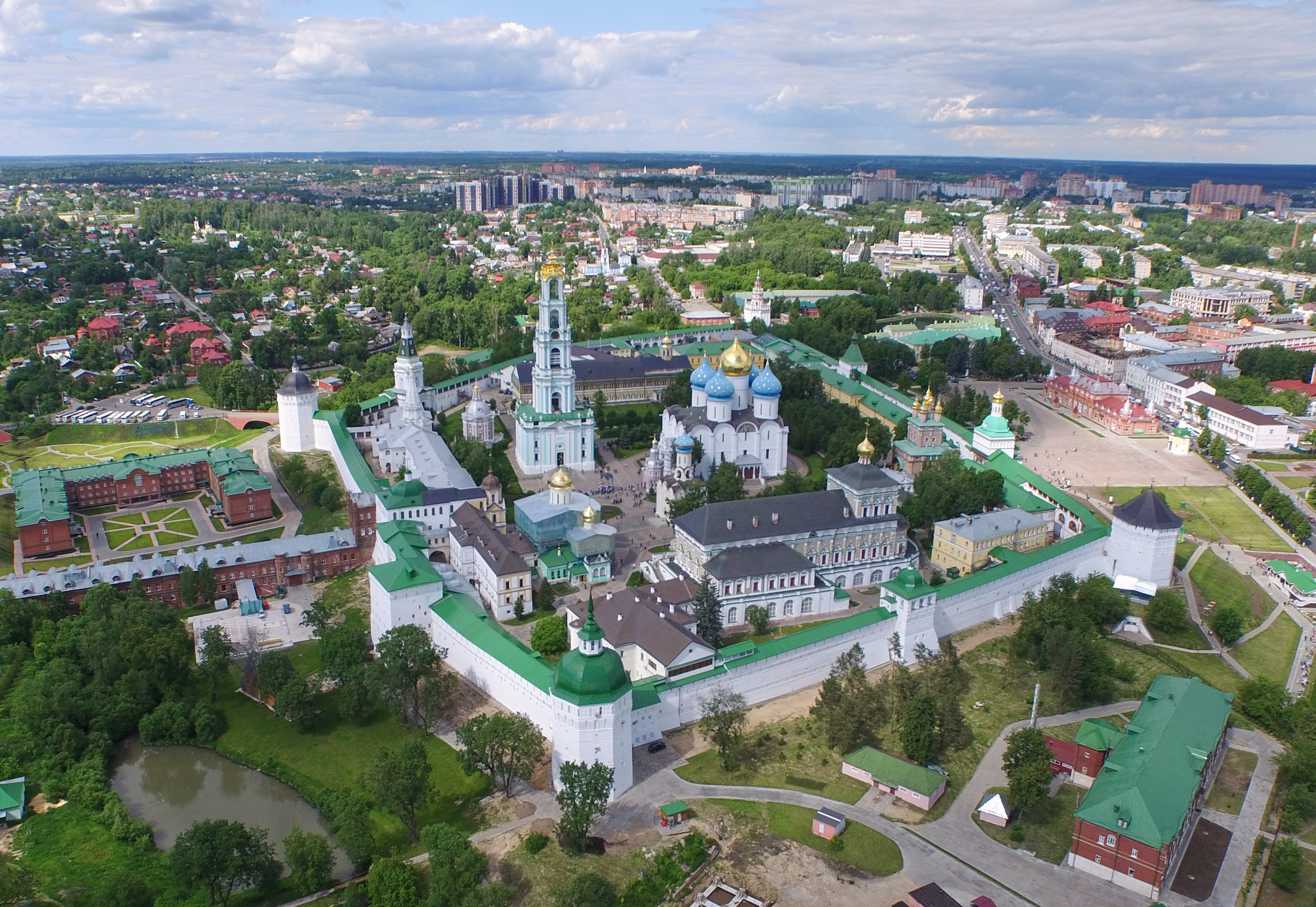
Trinity Lavra of St. Sergius in Sergiyev Posad

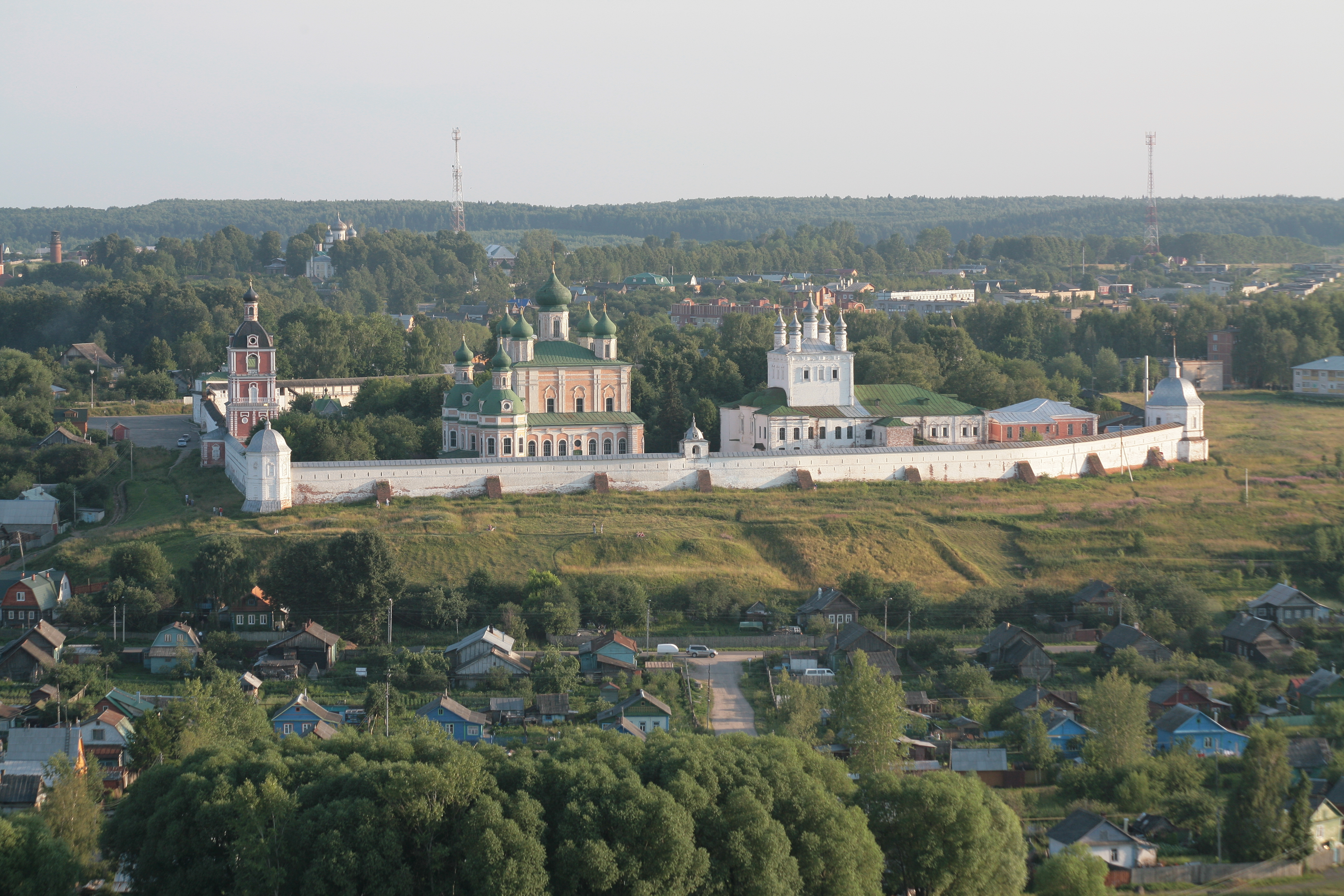
Goritsky Monastery in Pereslavl-Zalessky

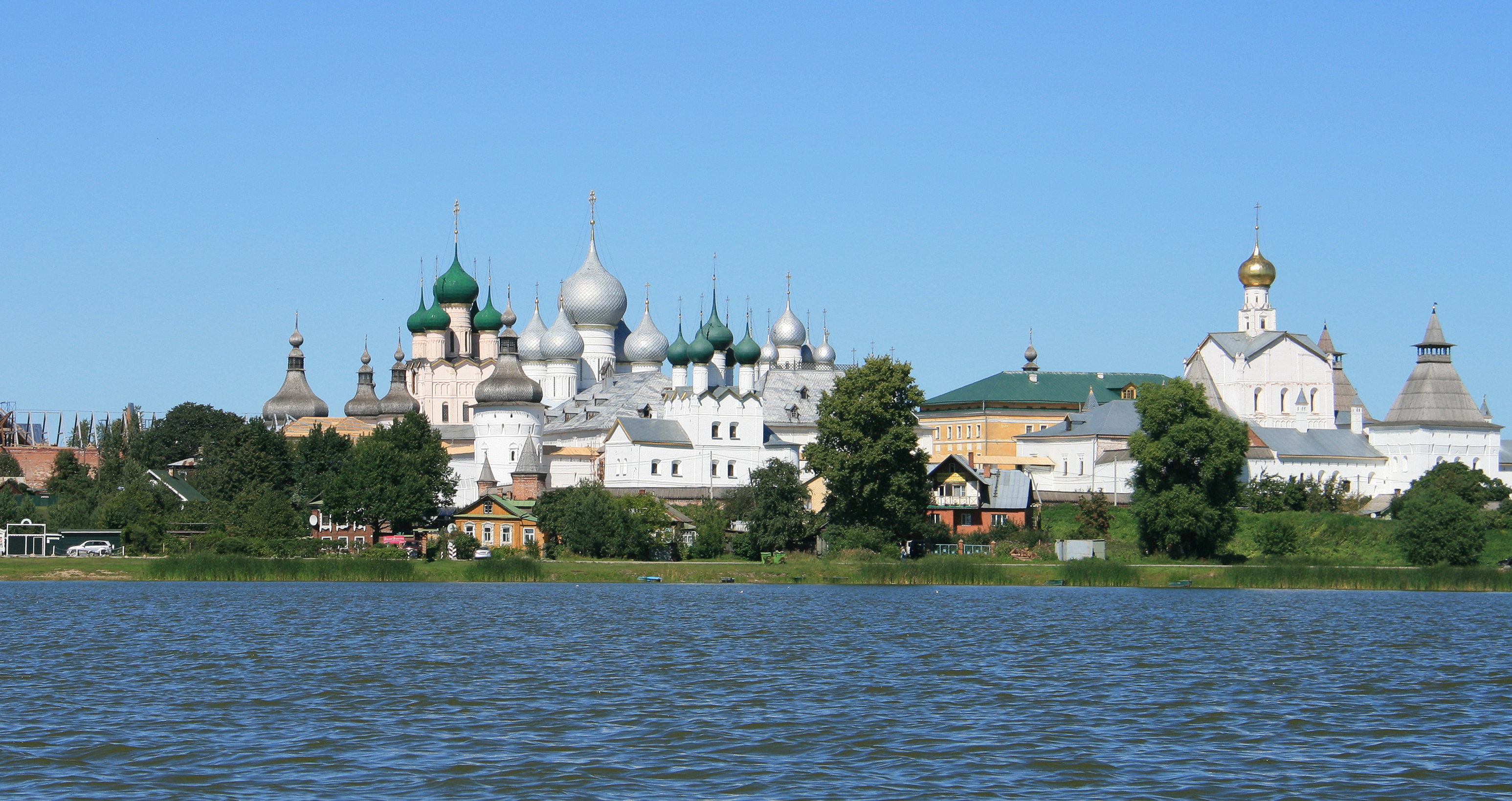
Rostov Kremlin in Rostov

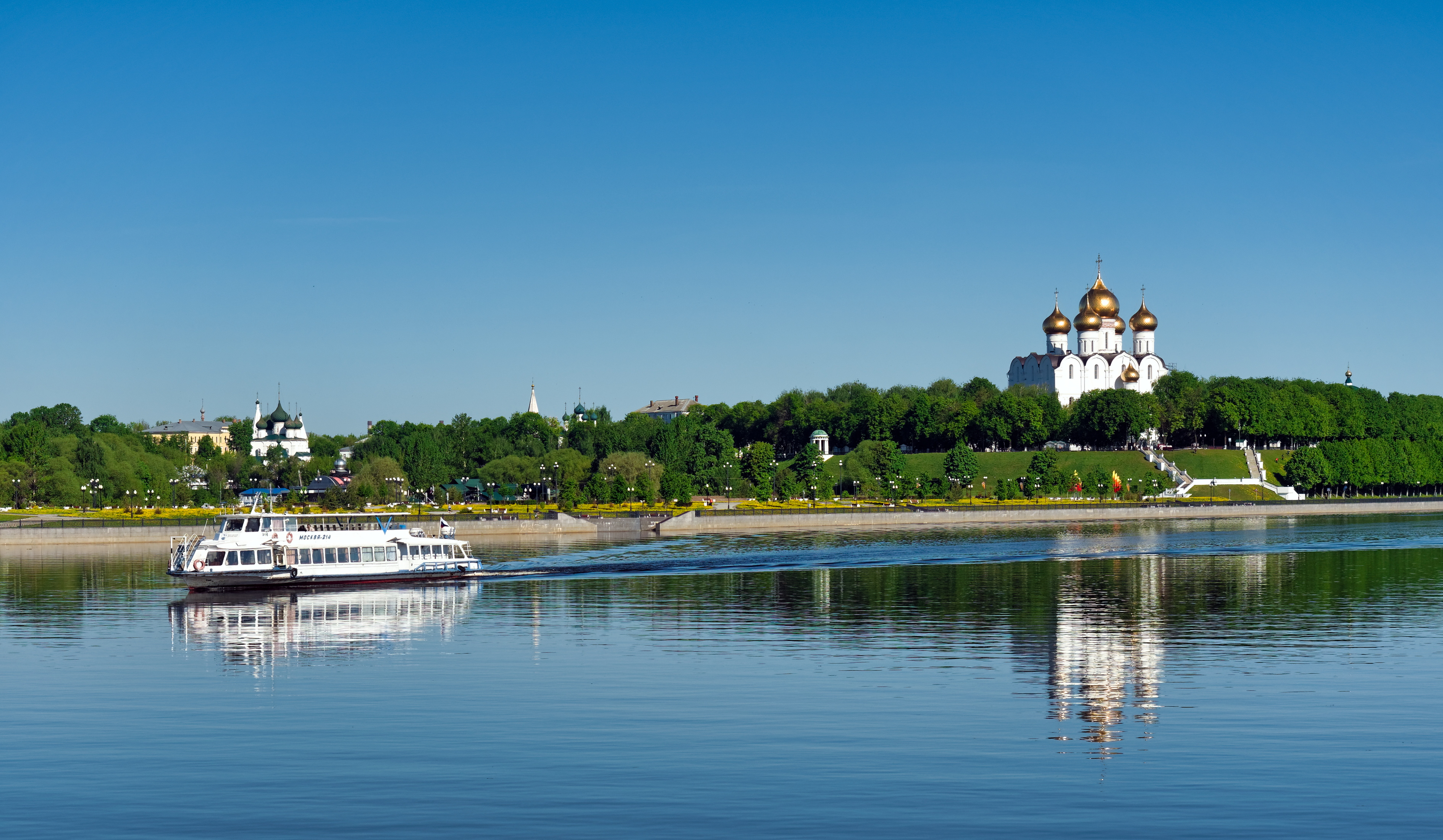
Cathedral of the Dormition in Yaroslavl

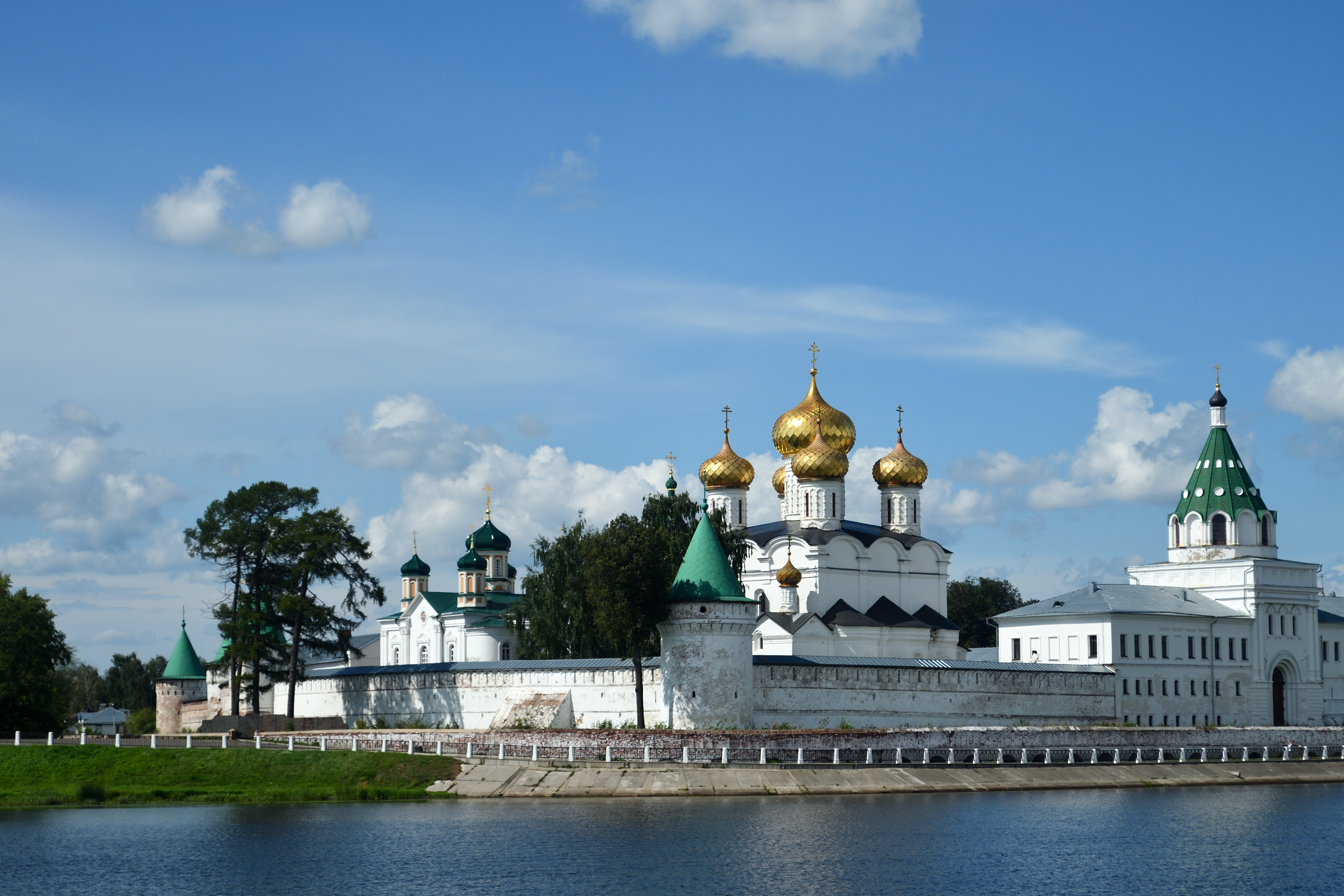
Ipatievsky Monastery in Kostroma

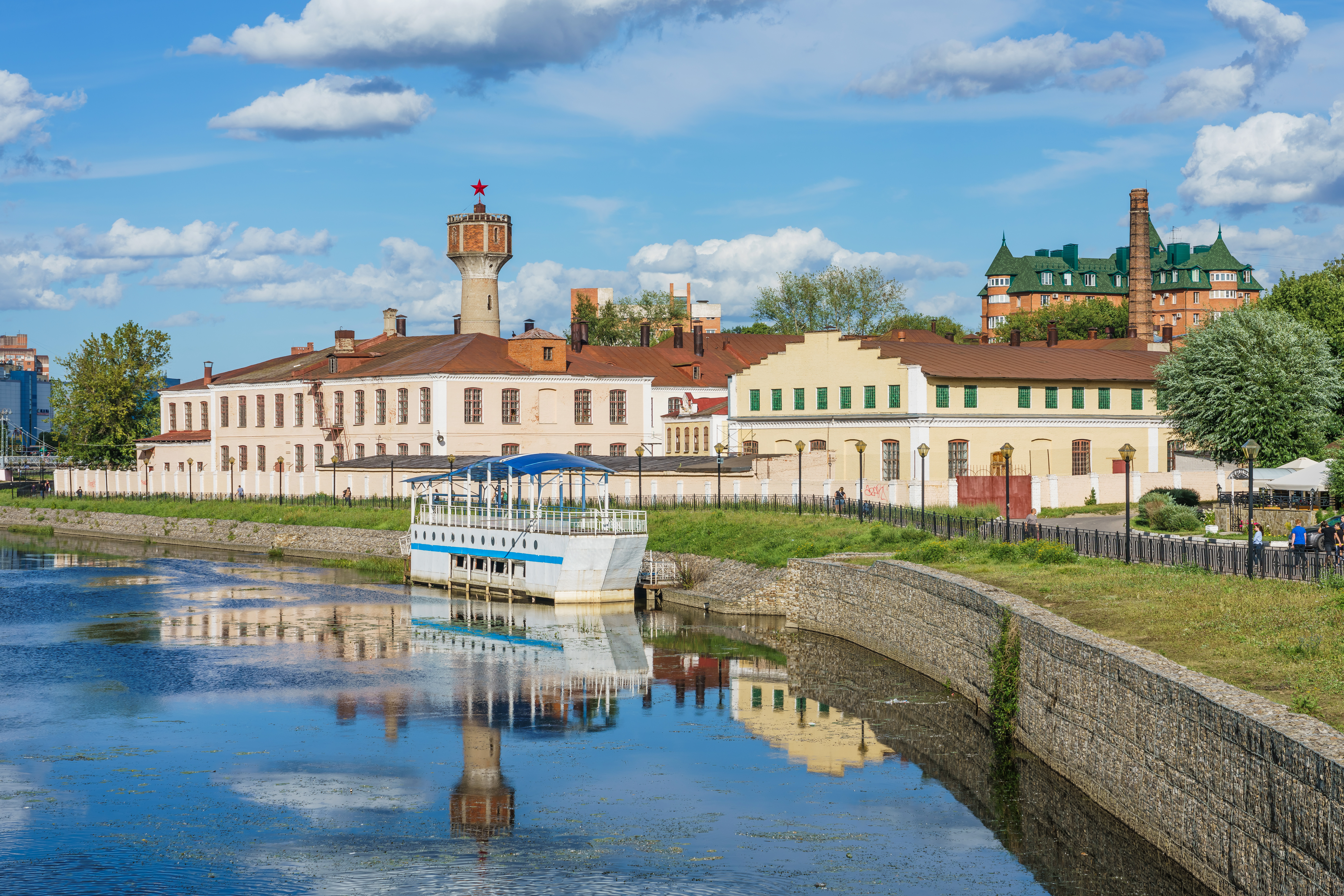
Fokin Manufactory in Ivanovo

Pokrovsky Monastery and Monastery of Saint Euthymius in Suzdal

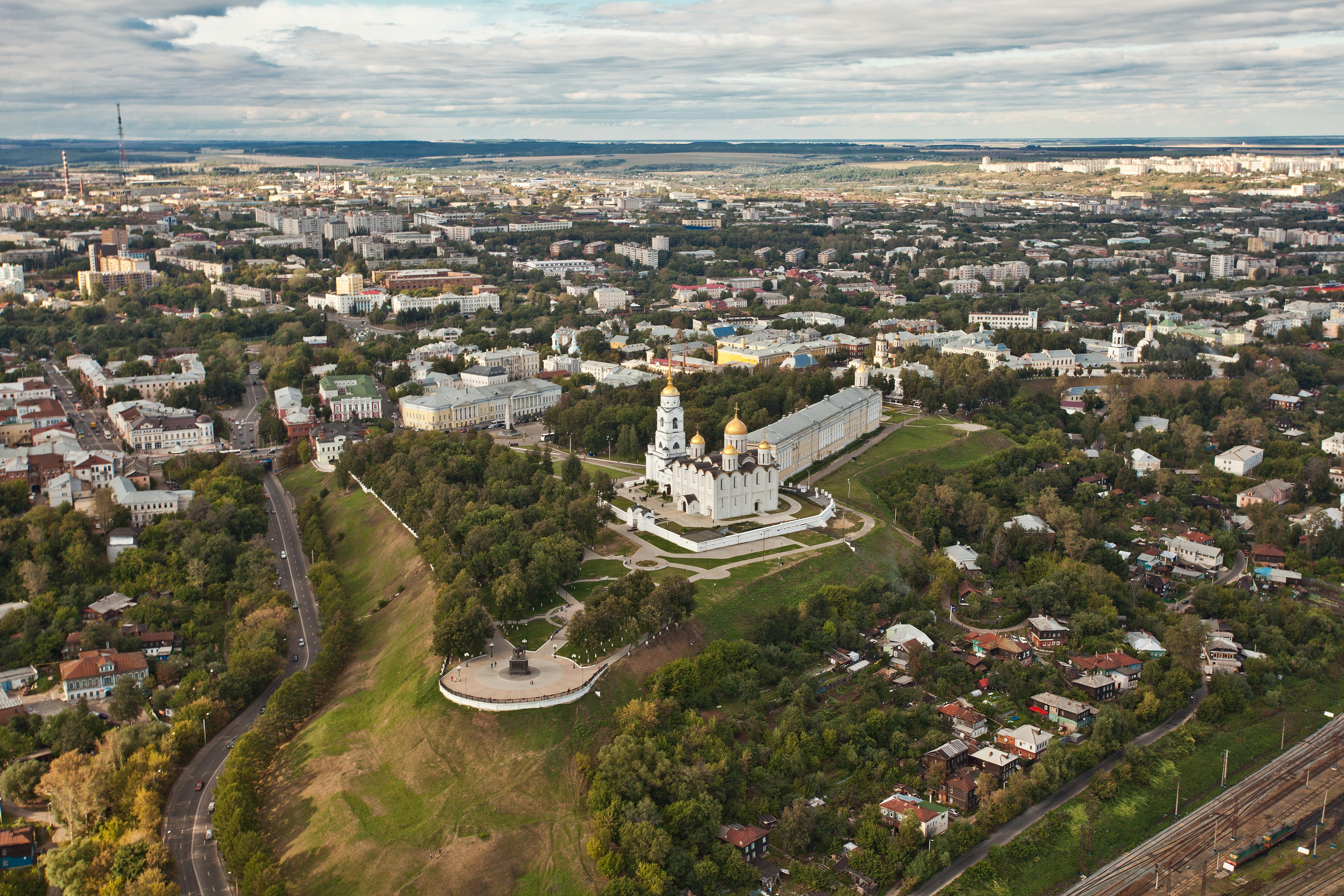
Dormition Cathedral in Vladimir

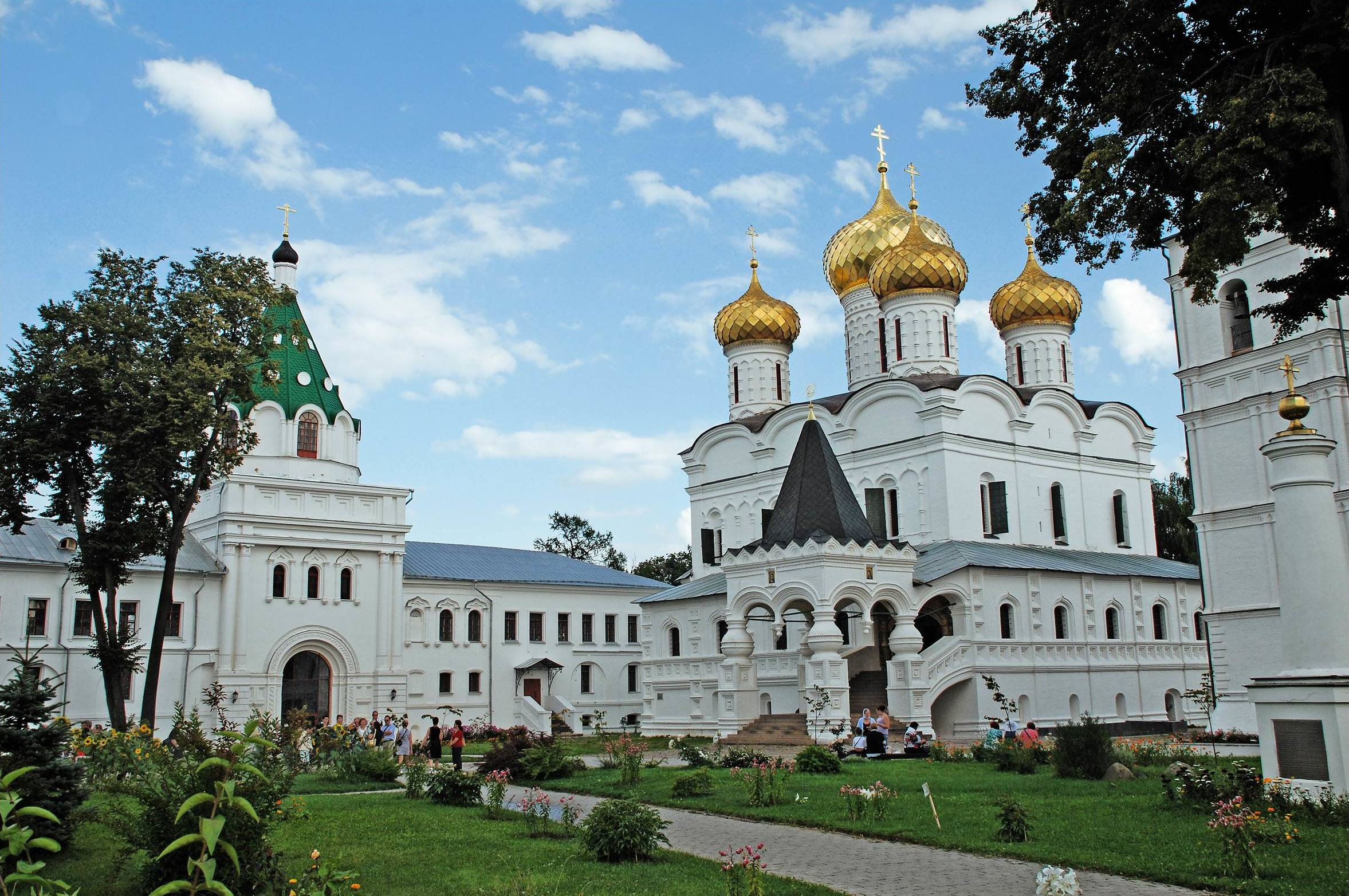
Kostroma is one of the cities which belongs to the Golden Ring of Russia. The city was an important trading city in ancient Rus. Photo of the Ipatievsky Monastery, 2009

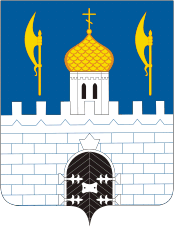
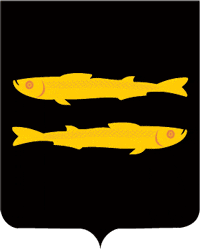
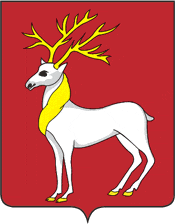
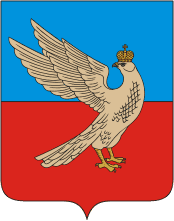
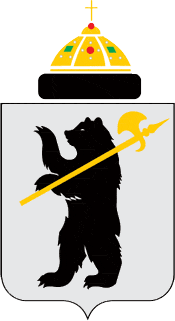
Vladimir

For years, tourists and locals debated about which cities were "officially" part of the Golden Ring. There is no official list of which cities make up part of the Golden Ring with the exception of the eight principal cities of Yaroslavl, Kostroma, Ivanovo, Suzdal, Vladimir, Sergiev Posad, Pereslavl-Zalessky and Rostov Veliky. In addition, other old cities in the Ivanovo, Vladimir and Yaroslavl regions also considered themselves as part of the ring, including Palekh, Plyos, and Shuya in Ivanovo Oblast; Gorokhovets, Gus-Khrustalny, Murom, and Yuriev-Polsky in Vladimir Oblast; and Rybinsk, Tutaev, and Uglich in Yaroslavl Oblast. Many cities are to be found along the M8 highway or can be reached from Yaroslavsky railway station in Moscow. Some of the churches, kremlins and monasteries are UNESCO World Heritage Sites. In Russia, the area of the Golden Ring is one of the regions that has strongly preserved many traditions and culture of ancient Russia to this day.

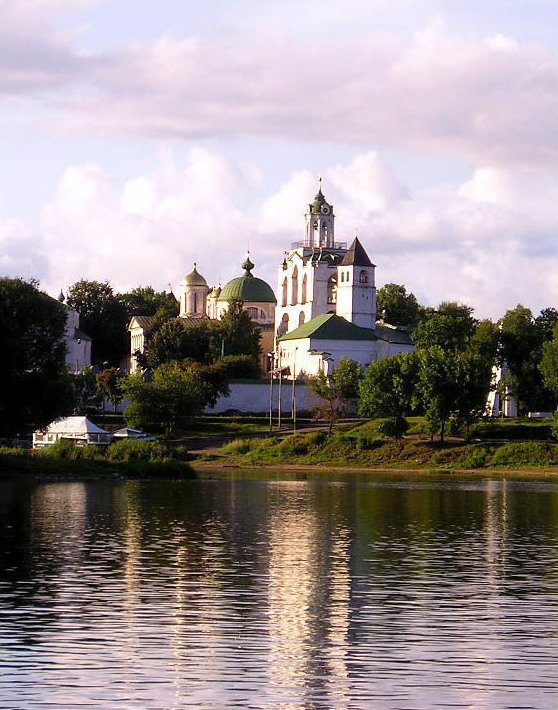
Kotorosl River in Yaroslavl, 2004

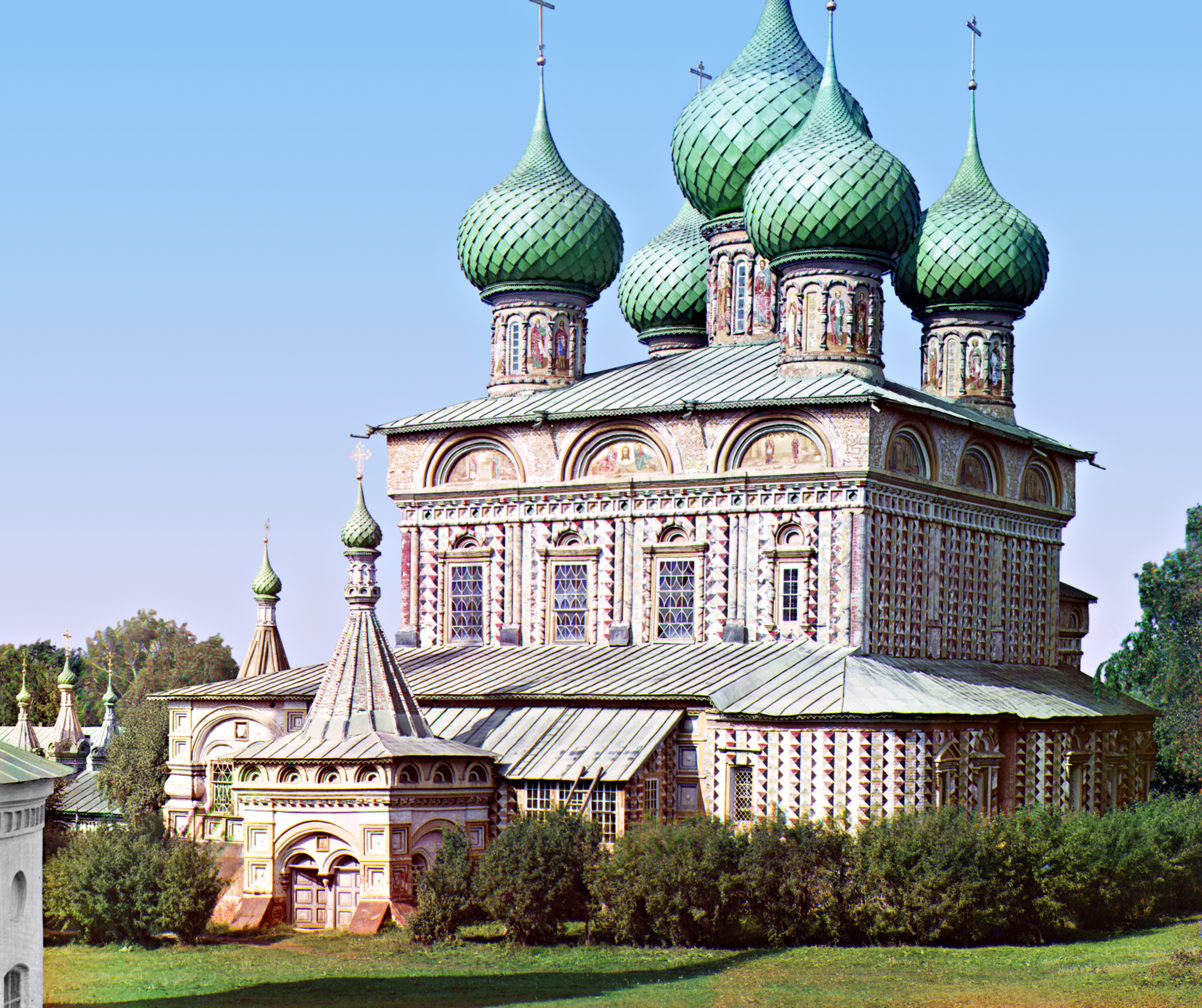
The Resurrection Church of Kostroma (1652) is a superb example of the 17th-century Russian art (color photograph, Sergei Mikhailovich Prokudin-Gorskii, 1910, Library of Congress)

- Sergiyev Posad (Се́ргиев Поса́д) is the only city in the Moscow Region to be included in the Golden Ring. It is closely linked with the UNESCO-protected Troitse-Sergieva Lavra which was founded in the 14th century by St Sergius of Radonezh. The Lavra is now one of the most important religious sites in Russia and St Sergius is one of the most revered native Russian saints.
- Pereslavl-Zalesskiy (Переславль-Залесский) is the birthplace of Aleksandr Nevsky – a celebrated Russian hero, prince and saint. It also has links with Peter the Great who used to have a toy flotilla here on Lake Plescheevo. In addition the city also boasts a beautiful 12th-century cathedral, earthen mounds and six monasteries, four of which are active.
- Rostov Velikiy (Ростов) is known as Rostov-Veliky (Rostov the Great) to distinguish it from the larger and newer Rostov-on-Don. It is among the oldest of cities in Russia, having first been mentioned in chronicles in 862. Its most impressive sight is the white-stone kremlin which stands on Lake Nero and is now a museum-reserve. The city also has three monasteries and museums dedicated to the art of painting on enamel for which the city is famed.
- Yaroslavl (Ярослáвль) is considered the unofficial capital of the Golden Ring and is also a UNESCO World Heritage Site. It is believed to have been founded in 1010 by Prince Yaroslav the Wise, after whom it is named. The city’s main sight is the Spaso-Preobrazhensky Monastery which is now a museum and among its many beautiful churches the most famous are St Elijah the Prophet’s Church and the John the Baptist’s Church, both of which are beautifully decorated with frescos. Yaroslavl is just a 3-hour express train ride from Moscow.
- Kostroma (Кострома) Like Moscow, Kostroma is believed to have been founded by Grand Prince Yury Dolgoruky in the 12th century. The city is most famous for its Ipatievsky Monastery which has links with the Romanov Dynasty as the first Romanov tsar – Tsar Michael – was here being anointing to reign. Kostroma is the Golden Ring city furthest from Moscow and can be reached by a night train from the capital.
- Ivanovo (Иваново) is both the youngest and most industrialised of all Golden Ring cities. Previously the city was known as Ivanovo-Voznesensk after the two villages that were merged to form the new city in 1871. It is forever connected with its once-booming textile trade which led to the city being known as Bride City and Russian Manchester. Ivanovo is notable for its constructivist buildings, industrial architecture and monuments dedicated to the city's rich revolutionary history.
- Gus-Khrustalny (Гусь-Хруста́льный)
- Suzdal (Суздаль) is often referred to as an open-air museum for the number of old buildings that have been preserved and the lack of industrialisation. Several sights are protected by UNESCO as the White Stone Monuments of Vladimir and Suzdal. Highlights include the Spaso-Yefimiev Monastery, which is now a museum, and the museums of the kremlin. In addition there are another four monasteries in the city.
- Vladimir (Владимир), the former capital of medieval Russia, is historically important. It is somewhat more industrial than its neighbor, Suzdal, but St Demetrius’ Cathedral and the Dormition Cathedral, Vladimir's Golden Gates, are UNESCO protected and masterpieces of ancient Russian architecture.
- Rybinsk (Рыбинск)
- Uglich (Углич)
- Myshkin (Мышкин)
- Alexandrov (Александров)

== Branding ==
Now the main and most popular tourist route around provincial cities of central European Russia, the promotion of the Golden Ring was a new challenge after the dissolution of the Soviet Union. From a sustainability standpoint, there were new goals that needed to be achieved: the preservation of ancient architectural monuments, modernising the tourism industry within new capitalist system, building new types of infrastructures such as hotels, theme parks, museums and malls that encouraged economic growth. As a result, cities of the Golden Ring were the first ones that saw the outcome out of investments from new forms of entrepreneurship like privately owned businesses and startups.

== See also ==
- Golden Triangle (India)
