= Saburov =

Saburov (feminine: Saburova) is a Russian-language surname. It may refer to:

- Saburov family, a family of Russian nobility
- Maksim Saburov (1900-1977), Soviet engineer, economist and politician
- Nurlan Saburov (born 1991), Kazakh–Russian comedian
- Peter Petrovich Saburov (1880-1932), Russian diplomat, chess player and composer
- Peter Alexandrovich Saburov (1835–1918), Russian diplomat, collector of ancient Greek sculpture and antiquities, and a strong amateur chess player
- Alexander Saburov (1908-1974), a leader of Soviet partisan movement in Ukraine and western Russia during the German-Soviet War
- Solomonia Saburova
- Irina Saburova
- Agrafena Saburova
