= Nuran Tanrıverdi =

Turkish architect and painter

- Born: İzmir, Turkey
- Education: Architecture
- Alma mater: Ege University Faculty of Art, Design and Architecture
- Known for: painting
- Style: abstract, impressionism
- Website: NuranTanriverdi

Nuran Tanrıverdi is a Turkish architect and painter.

== Biography ==
Nuran Tanrıverdi was born in İzmir, Turkey. She graduated from the Faculty of Art, Design and Architecture of the Ege University in 1978. As a registered architect, she went to Stuttgart, Germany, and worked there as an architect for three years. Afterwards, she worked back in her hometown, İzmir. In both locations, she continued to develop her painting and art experience in various studios of different well known Turkish and German artists. Currently, she continues her work in her own studio in İzmir. She has had 20 personal exhibitions.

Tanrıverdi has had exhibitions for her paintings in İzmir, Istanbul, and Ankara. Some of her paintings have also been displayed in different exhibitions in Stockholm, Moldova and Nakhchivan. Different art collections, both in Turkey and abroad, contain works made by Tanrıverdi.

An exhibition of Tanrıverdis works were displayed at the grand opening of the Consulate General of Nakhchivan Exhibition Hall on November 26, 2010.

== Style ==
Stylistically in her works that express the female body, she is said to show both abstract traits and those of impressionism. "Suitability", "elegance" and "elusiveness", but also "timelessness" and "serenity" are terms that have been used to describe her style.

== Exhibitions ==
- 1974 İzmir Art and Sculpture Museum, İzmir
- 1988 İzmir Art and Sculpture Museum, İzmir
- 1990 İş Bank Galery, İzmir
- 1991 Gümrük Art Gallery, İzmir
- 1997 Çetin Emeç Art Gallery, İzmir
- 1998 İzmir Commerce Room Exhibition Hall, İzmir
- 1999 International Art Fair, Stockholm, Sweden
- 2001 Turgut Pura Art Gallery, İzmir
- 2001 İzmir Art and Sculpture Museum, İzmir
- 2002 Konak Municipality Art Gallery, İzmir
- 2003 French Culture Center, İzmir
- 2004 Sheraton Hotel, Çeşme, İzmir
- 2005 Kişinev Art Campus, Moldova
- 2005 AKM – 1. International Aegean Art Fair, İzmir
- 2005 Galeri Soyut, Ankara
- 2006 Galeri Artist, Istanbul
- 2006 Bodrum Cam Sanat Galerisi, Bodrum
- 2006 Atölye EN Sanat Galerisi, İzmir
- 2007 İzmir Ticaret Odası Sanat Galerisi, İzmir
- 2008 Sheraton, Ankara
- 2008 Galeri Soyut, Ankara
- 2010 Çankaya Belediyesi Çağdaş Sanatlar Mrk., Ankara
- 2010 Kedi Sanat Galerisi, İzmir
- 2010 Artpoint Galeri, Istanbul
- 2010 Ayna Galeri, Bodrum
- 2010 The Marmara Hotel, Bodrum
- 2011 Wine Way Art Gallery Çeşme Marina, Çeşme
- 2011 Turkish Consulate General Nakhchivan
- 2013 Turkish Consulate General Bregenz, Austria,
- 2018 Chamber of Architects, İzmir,
- 2018 İzmir Chamber of Commerce
