= Nuran, Azerbaijan =

Nuran
- Municipality
- Location within Azerbaijan
- Coordinates: 40°39′35″N 48°25′04″E
- Country: Azerbaijan
- Rayon: Agsu

Population
  - Total: 379
- Time zone: UTC+4 (AZT)
  - Summer (DST): UTC+5 (AZT)

Nuran is a village and municipality in the Agsu Rayon of Azerbaijan. It has a population of 379. The municipality consists of the villages of Nuran and Zərqava.
