= İzmir Painting and Sculpture Museum =

Art museum in İzmir, Turkey

Coordinates: 38.436052°N 27.148480°E

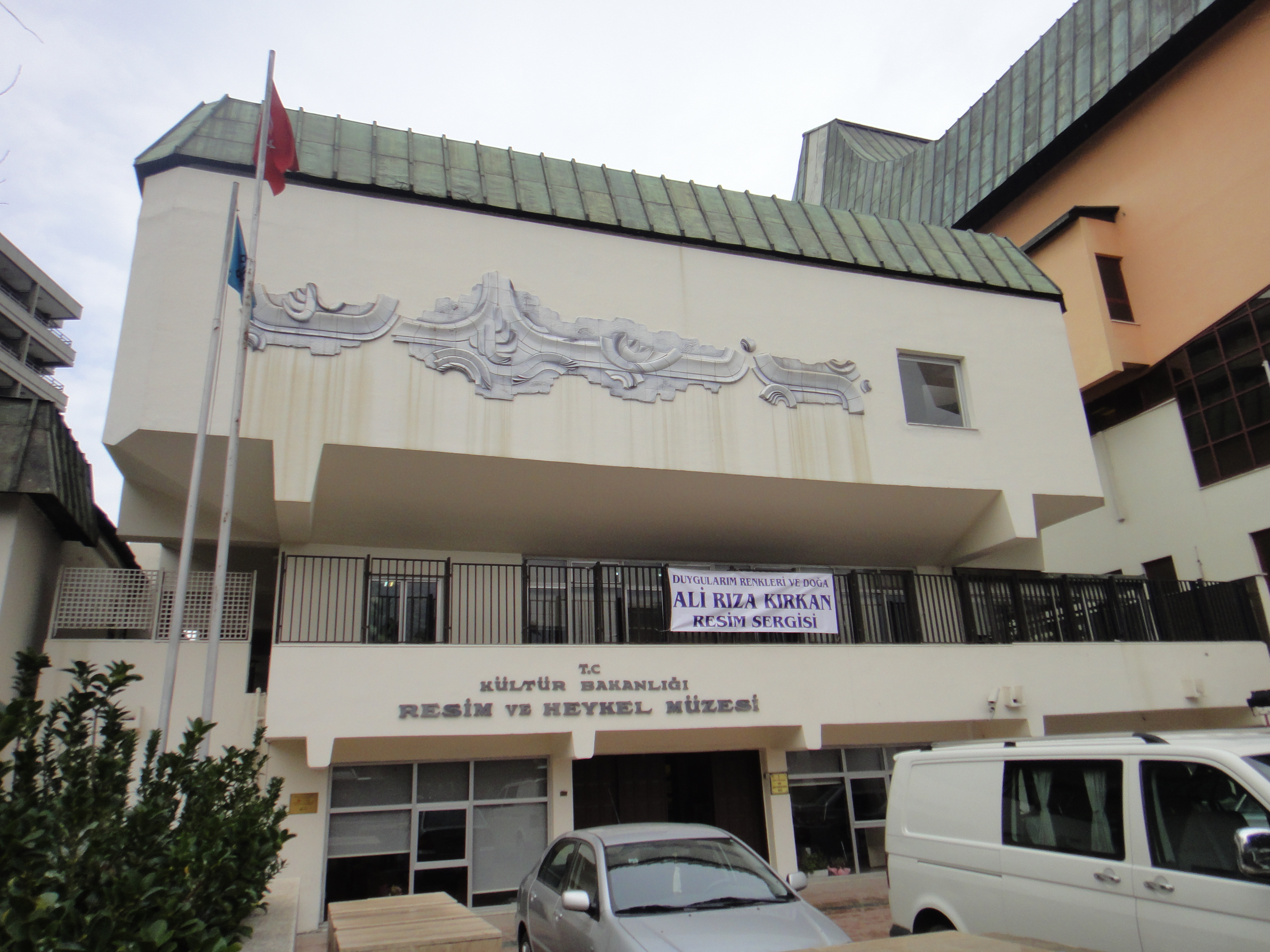
Former building of the İzmir Painting and Sculpture Museum

The İzmir Painting and Sculpture Museum (Turkish: İzmir Resim ve Heykel Müzesi) is an art museum in İzmir, Turkey.

Established by the Turkish state in 1952 as the İzmir State Painting and Sculpture Museum, the museum was later moved from the Kültürpark to its own buildings on Atatürk Boulevard near the Konak pier. The small museum displays mostly 20th-century paintings and sculptures from Turkish artists, and has a substantial collection of works by Turgut Pura. In April 2023, it was moved to the İzmir Culture and Arts Factory.
