= Zərqava, Agsu =

Coordinates: 40.5694°N 48.3999°E

Zərqava (also, Zarqava) is a village in the municipality of Nuran in the Agsu Rayon of Azerbaijan.
