= Yuri Bychkov =

Soviet writer (1931-2016)

Yuri Alexandrovich Bychkov
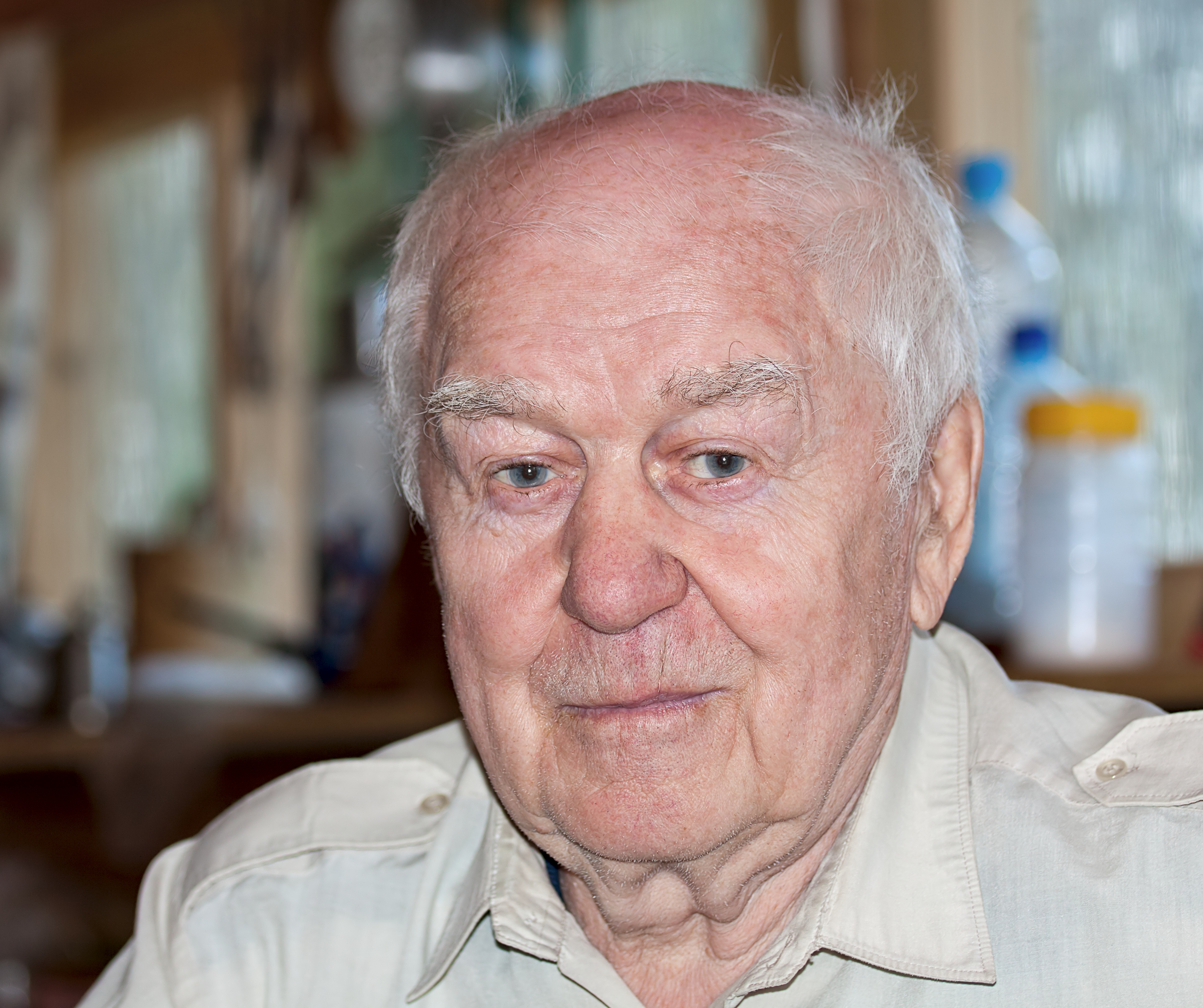
- Born: 1 September 1931; Lopasnya, Russian SFSR, Soviet Union
- Died: 18 April 2016 (aged 84); Moscow, Russian Federation
- Education: Moscow Aviation Institute
- Occupation: Art historian

Yuri Alexandrovich Bychkov (Russian: Юрий Александрович Бычков; 1 September 1931 – 18 April 2016) was an art historian, a member of the Union of Artists and the Union of Theatre Workers of the Russian Federation, director of writer's house museum Melikhovo in 1994-2004.

He graduated from the Moscow Aviation Institute.

Author of the idea, the pioneer of tourism Golden Ring. One of the founders VOOPIK (All-Russian Society for Historic Preservation and Cultural Organization).

He died in Moscow on 18 April 2016.

He was buried at the Khovrino Cemetery in the Mytishchi District of the Moscow Region.
