= Nuran, Khuzestan =

Nuran نوران
- Village
- Location within Iran
- Coordinates: 31°07′57″N 49°52′25″E
- Country: Iran
- Province: Khuzestan
- County: Ramhormoz
- Bakhsh: Central
- Rural District: Abolfares

Population (2006)
  - Total: 55
- Time zone: UTC+3:30 (IRST)
  - Summer (DST): UTC+4:30 (IRDT)

Nuran (Persian: نوران, also Romanized as Nūrān) is a village in Abolfares Rural District, in the Central District of Ramhormoz County, Khuzestan Province, Iran. At the 2006 census, its population was 55, in 13 families.
