= Hypatius of Gangra =

Saint Hypatius of Gangra
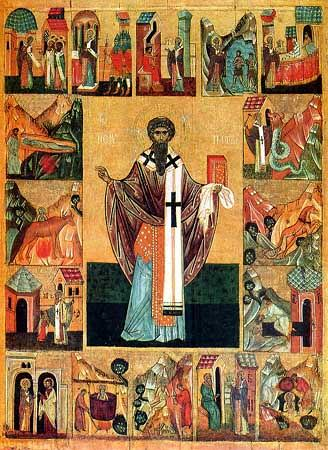
- A 15th-century Russian icon of St. Hypatius from the Hypatian Monastery
- Died: 326; Gangra, Roman Empire (modern-day Çankırı, Turkey)
- Cause of death: Blunt force trauma
- Known for: Hieromartyr

Hypatius of Gangra (Ancient Greek: Ὑπάτιος Γαγγρῶν) was Titular Bishop of Gangra, Asia Minor. He was present at the First Ecumenical Council where he supported Saint Athanasius the Great against the Arian heresy. The Eastern Orthodox Church celebrates him on March 31 and Roman Catholic Church celebrates him on 14 November.

== Death ==
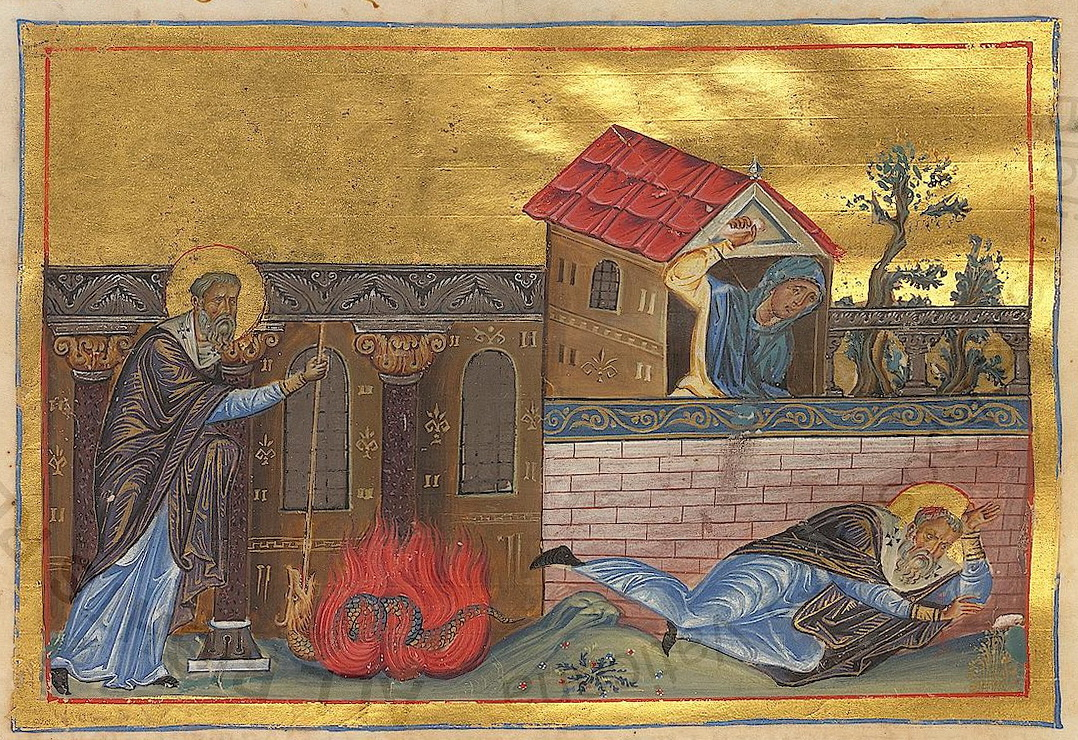

There is not much information about his life. On the road from Constantinople to Gangra in the year 326, followers of Novatus and Felicissimus attacked him in a desolate place, and threw him into a muddy swamp. A woman who was amongst the attackers, struck him on the head with a rock – delivering a killing blow. Immediately after, she went mad, and started hitting herself with the same stone. She was healed only after they brought her back to the saint's burial place.

His body was found by some Christians who ran to the city of Gangra, and the inhabitants of the city came and buried him, their beloved archpriest. After his death, the relics of the saint became famous for numerous miracles. For that reason, he is called a Wonderworker.

== See also ==
- Hypatian Monastery
