= Ipatiev Monastery =

Monastery in Russia

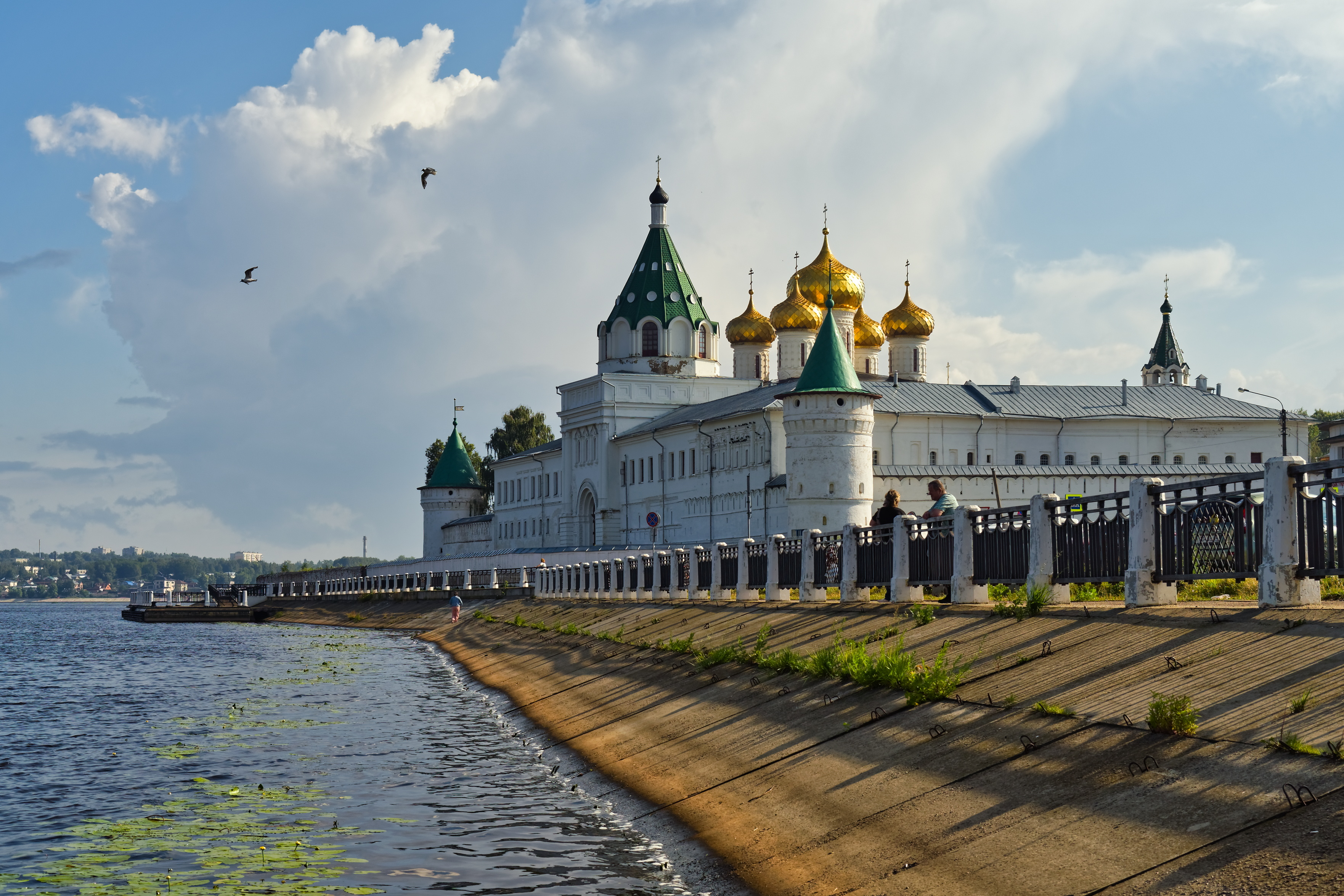
- Ipatiev Monastery

- Location within Russia

Monastery information
- Order: Orthodox
- Established: 1330 (or 1275)
- Disestablished: 1918
- Diocese: Kostroma

People
- Founders: Zacharias, nobleman of Kostroma

Site
- Location: Kostroma, Russia
- Coordinates: 57°46′35″N 40°53′40″E

The Ipatiev Monastery (Russian: Ипатьевский монастырь; also Ipatievsky Monastery), sometimes translated into English as Hypatian Monastery, is a male monastery situated on the bank of the Kostroma River just opposite the city of Kostroma.

It was founded around 1330 by a Tatar convert, Prince Chet, whose male-line descendants included Solomonia Saburova and Tsar Boris Godunov, and is dedicated to St. Hypatios of Gangra.

== History ==
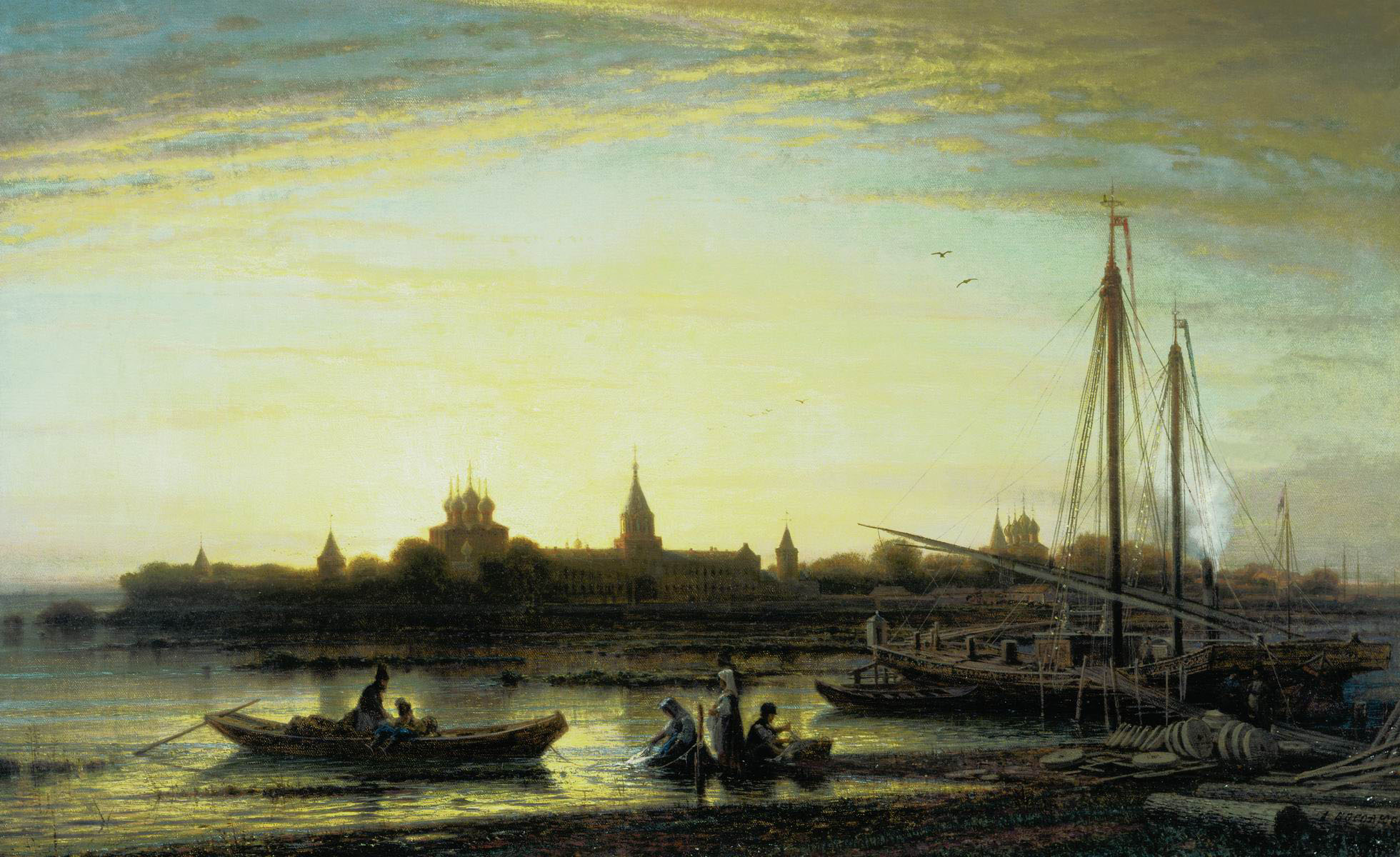
Hypatian Monastery, 1861 painting by Alexey Bogolyubov

=== Foundation ===
The main theory considers Tatar Murza Chet, baptized as Zachary, to be the founder of the Ipatievsky Monastery. The legend says that he was miraculously cured from a disease by a vision of the Virgin Mary and St. Philip and St. Hypatius, and decided to build the monastery as a sign of gratitude.

Some historians state that the monastery was founded in 1275 by Yaroslavich, but declined together with the Kostroma Principality after his death. In this case, the monastery could be not entirely built but only revived by Murza Chet.

=== 13th–15th centuries ===
In 1435, Vasily II concluded a peace with his cousin Vasily Kosoy there. At that time, the cloister was a notable centre of learning. It was here that Nikolay Karamzin discovered a set of three 14th-century chronicles, including the Primary Chronicle, now known as the Hypatian Codex.

=== 17th–18th centuries ===
During the Time of Troubles in Russia, the Ipatiev Monastery was occupied by the supporters of False Dmitriy II in the spring of 1609. In September of that same year, the monastery was captured by the Muscovite army after a long siege. On March 14, 1613, the Zemsky Sobor announced that Mikhail Romanov, who was in this monastery at the time, would be the Russian tsar.

Most of the monastery buildings date from the 16th and 17th centuries. The Trinity Cathedral is famous for its elaborately painted interior. The church of the Nativity of the Mother of God was rebuilt by the celebrated Konstantin Thon at the request of Tsar Nicholas I to celebrate the 250th anniversary of the House of Romanov. The Soviet authorities demolished it in 1932, but it was rebuilt in 2013. The main entrance from the riverside was also designed by Konstantin Thon. A private house of Mikhail Romanov was restored on the orders of Tsar Alexander II, though the authenticity of the reconstruction was questioned by Konstantin Pobedonostsev .

=== 20th century ===
The Ipatiev Monastery was disbanded after the October Revolution in 1917. It had been a part of the historical and architectural preservation of the Russian museum society, but in 1991, the authorities officiated the property authority return to the Russian Orthodox Church, despite strong opposition from museum officials.

On December 30, 2004, the government of Russia signed an order to transfer the monastery to the Kostroma Diocese.

== Our Times ==
In September 2002, one of the most prominent museum exhibits, the large wooden church (1628) from Spas-Vezhi village, was destroyed by fire.

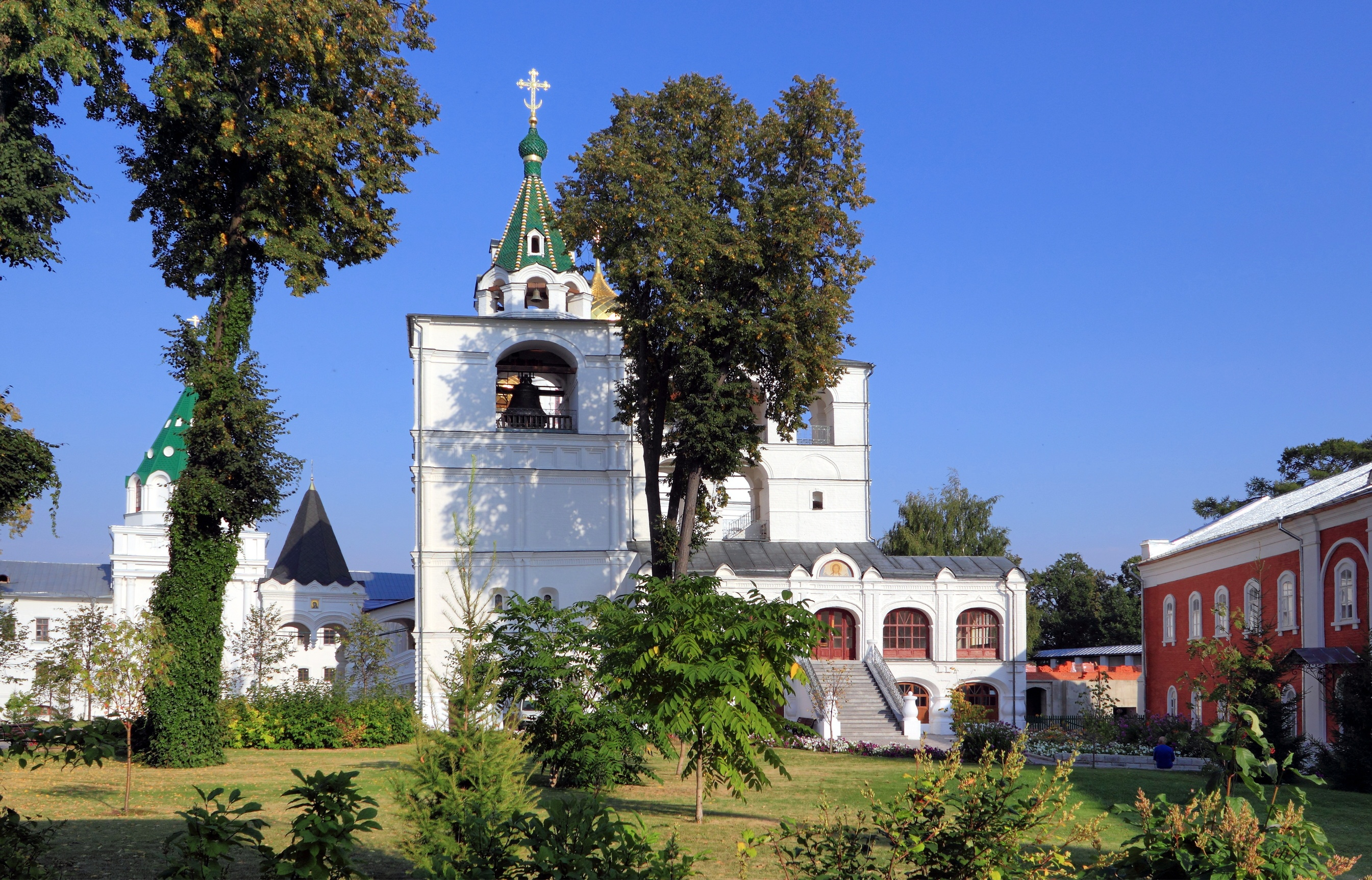
Zvonnitsa

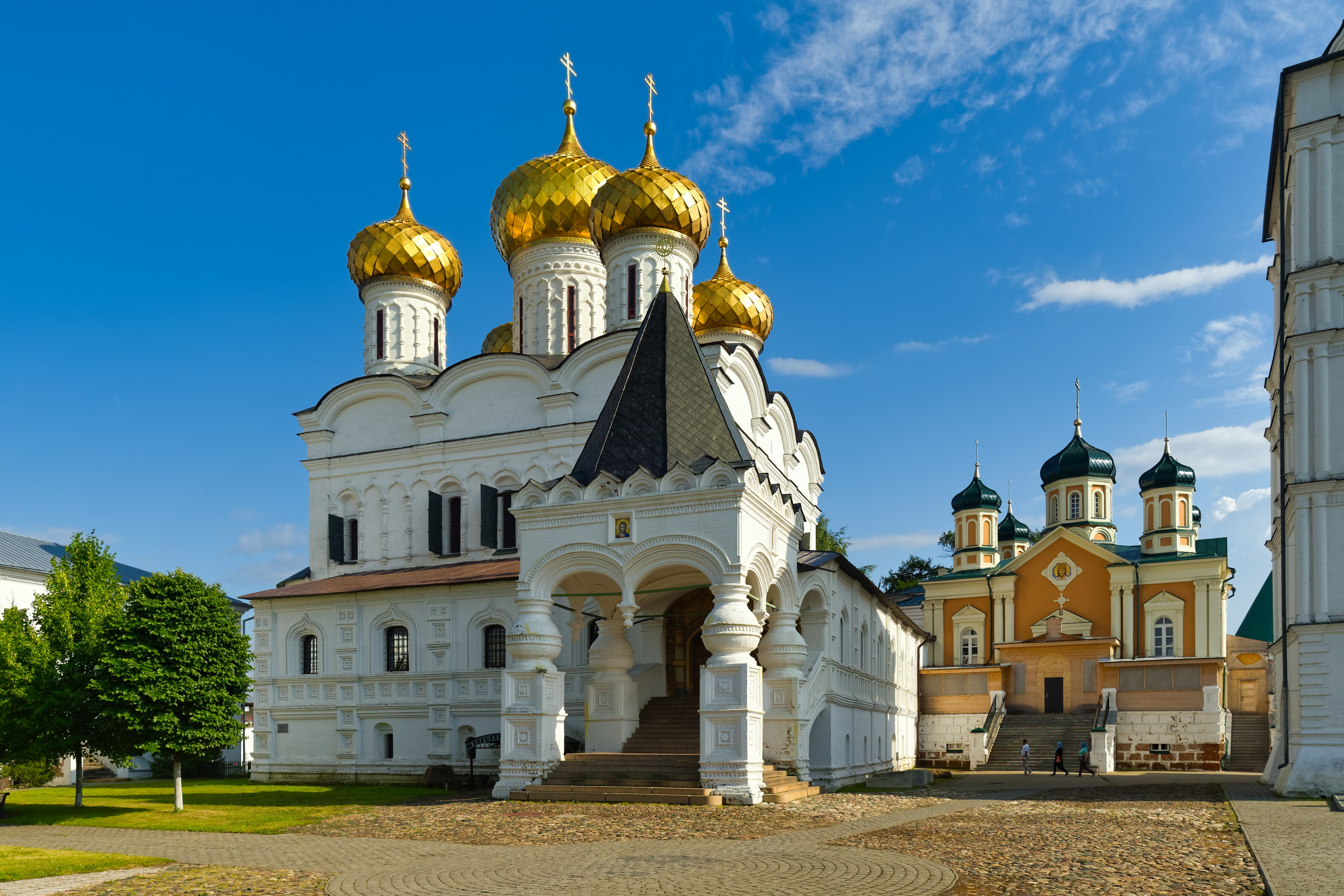
Trinity Cathedral

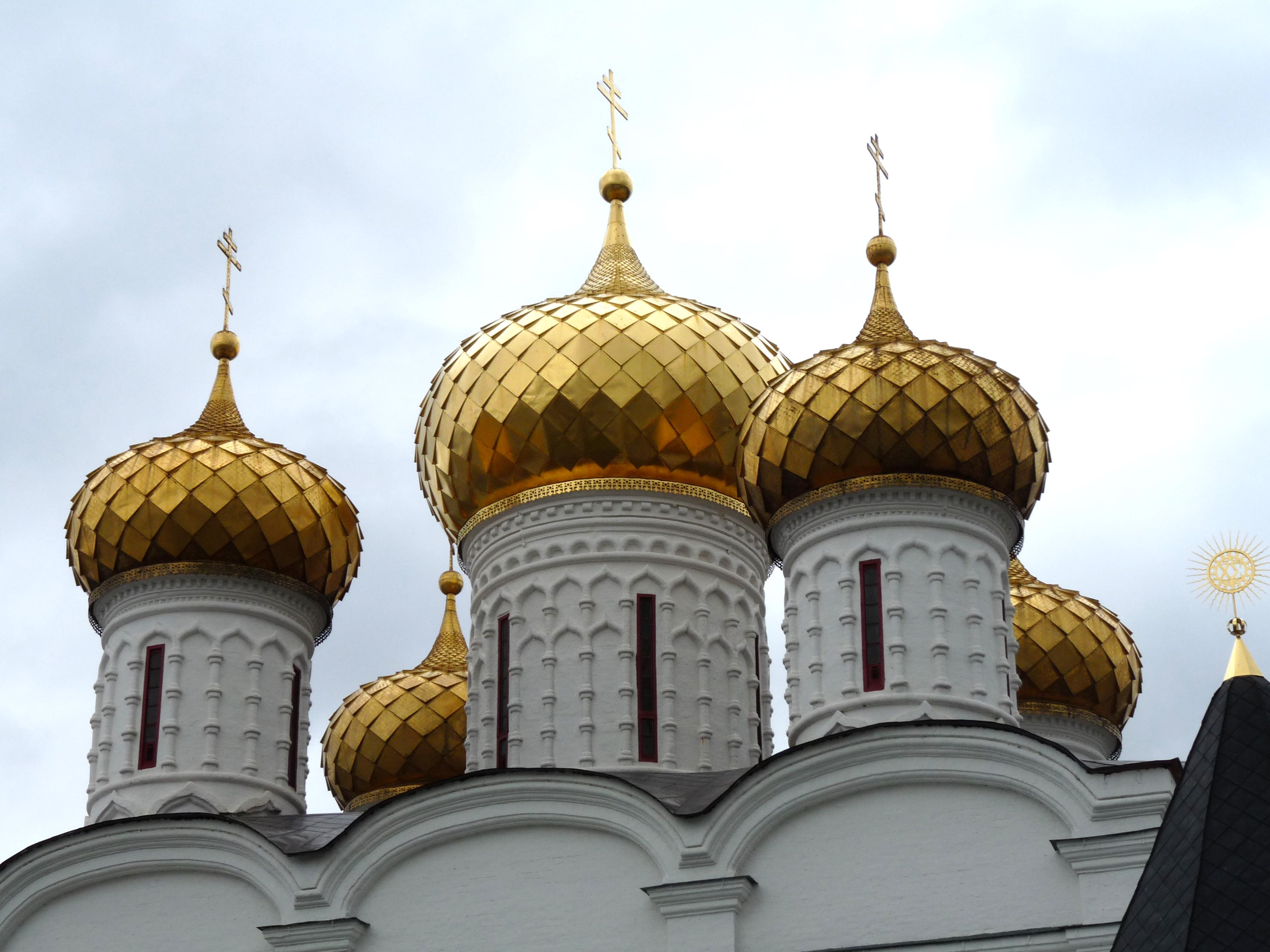
Domes of the Ipatievsky Monastery

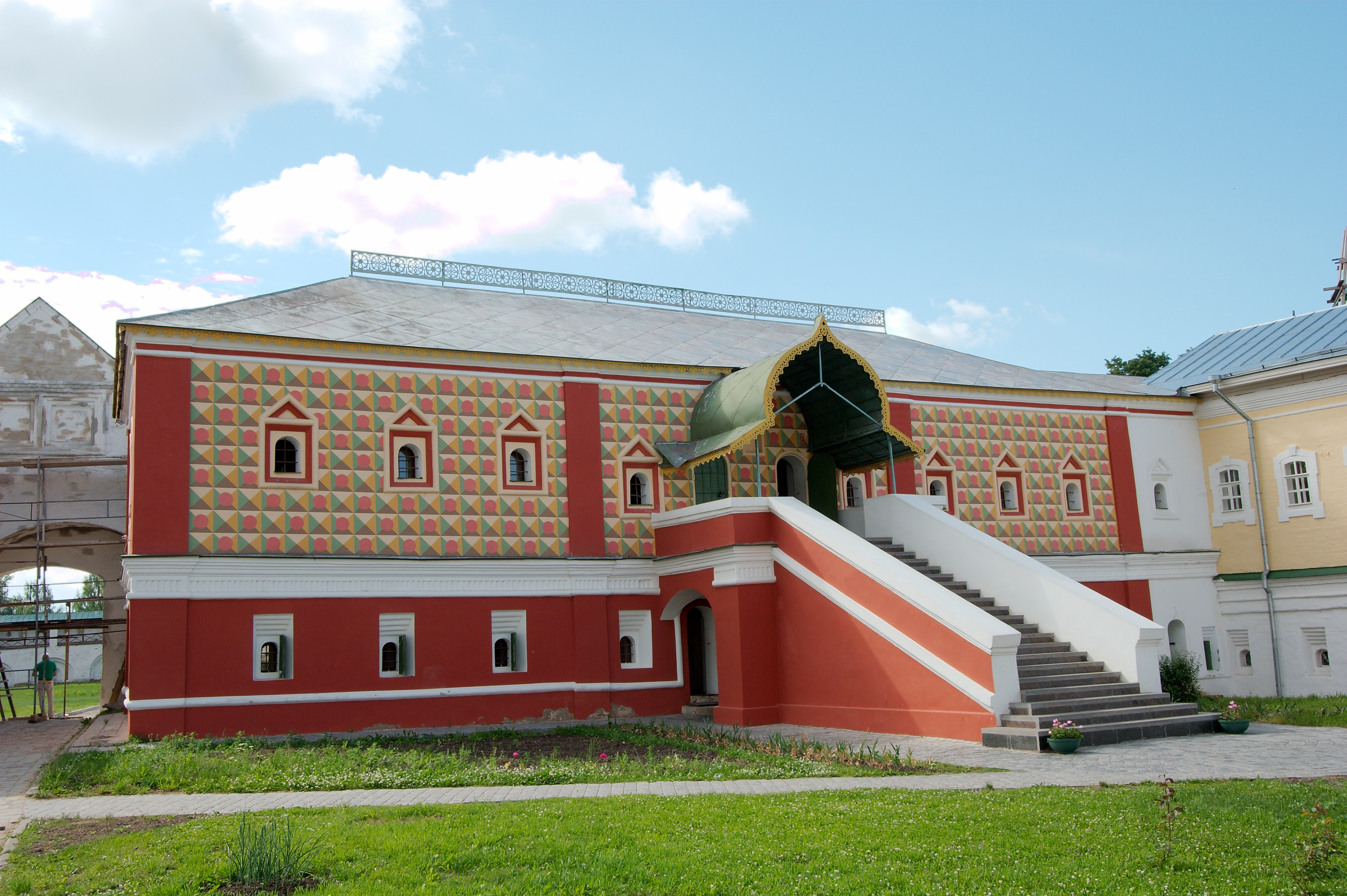
The restored Romanov boyar palace

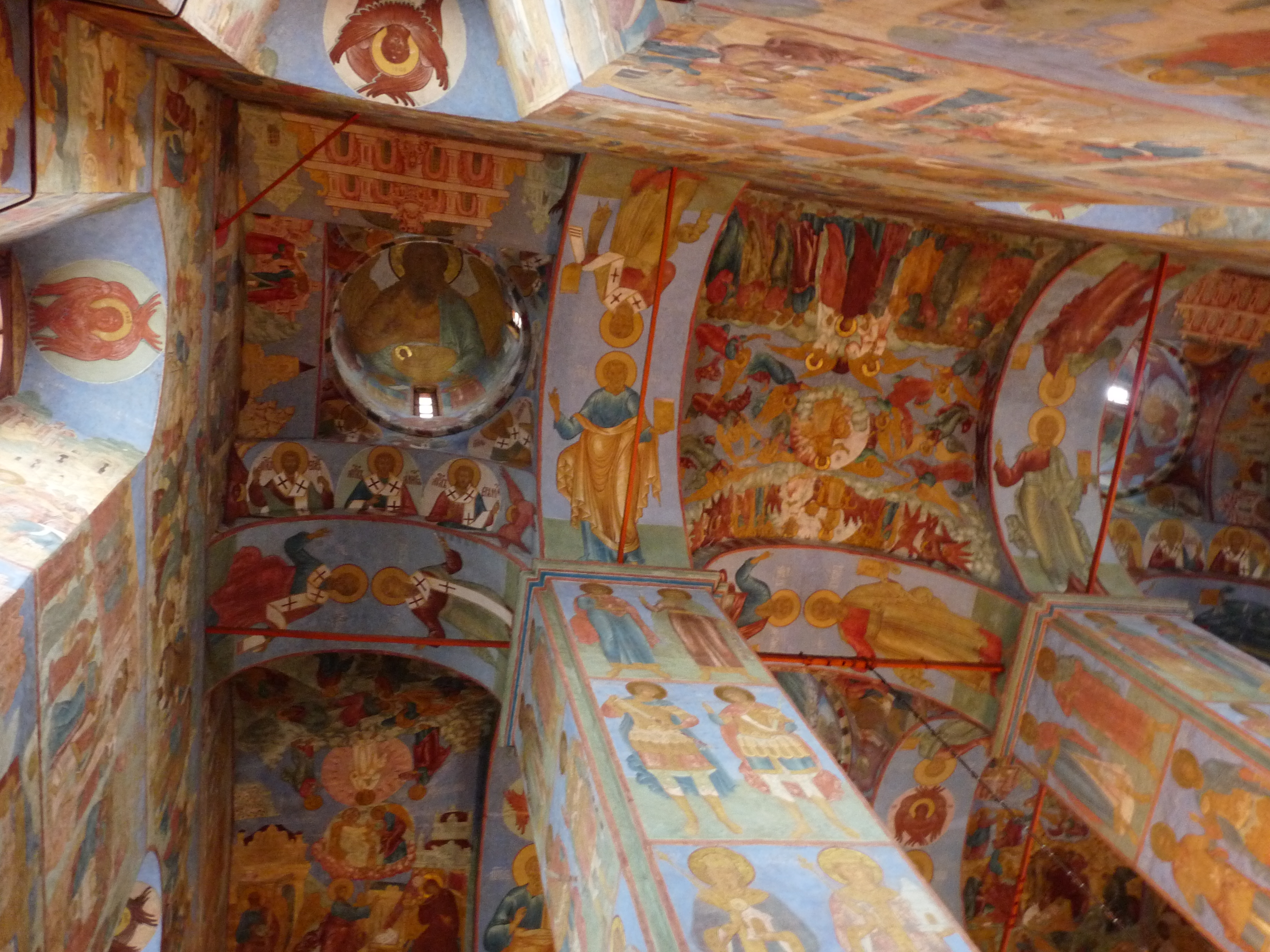
Ceiling of the Ipatievsky Monastery

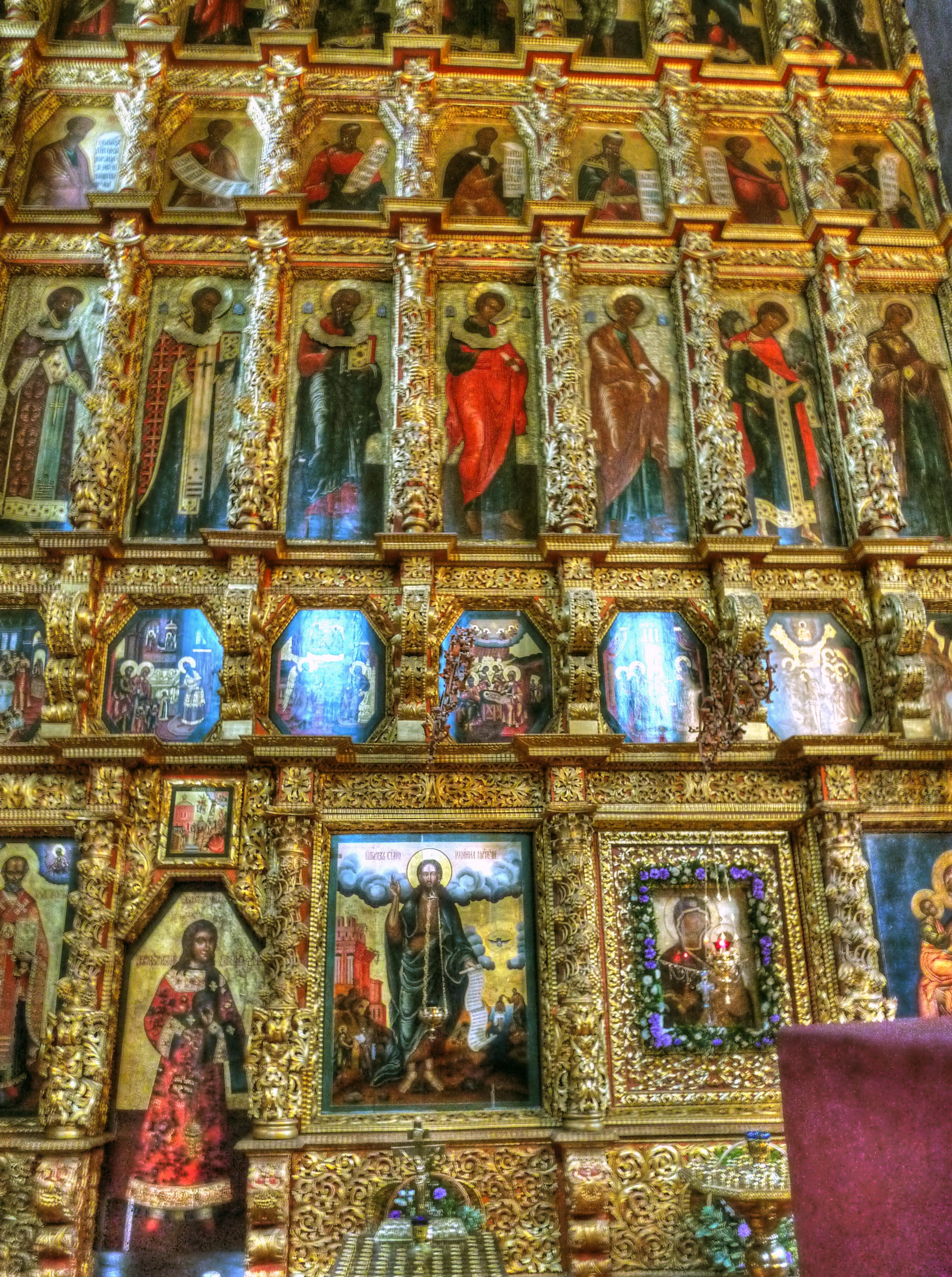
Icons of the Ipatievsky Monastery

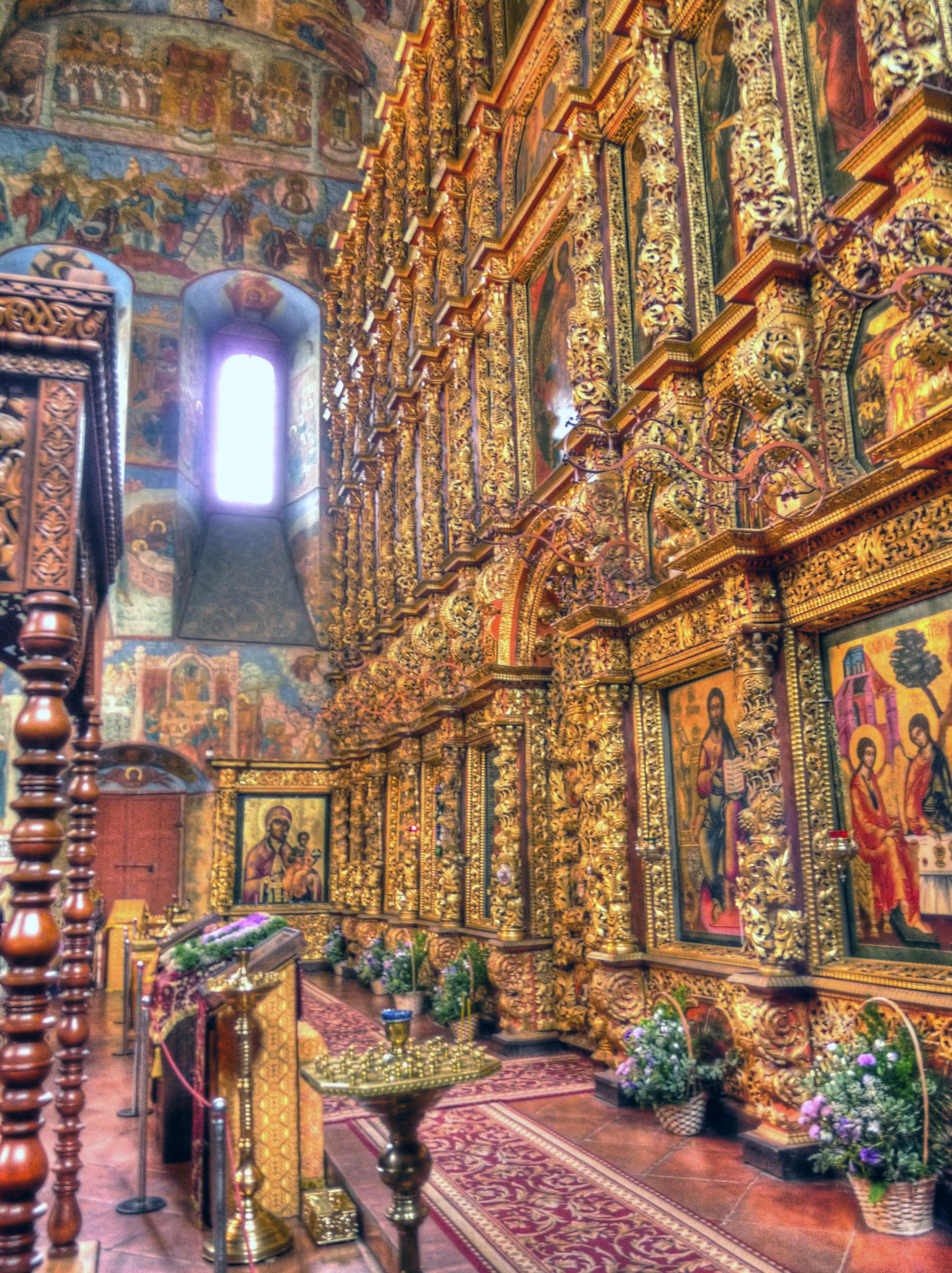
Icons of the Ipatievsky Monastery
