= Nurlan Saburov =

Kazakh stand-up comedian

- Нұрлан Сабыров
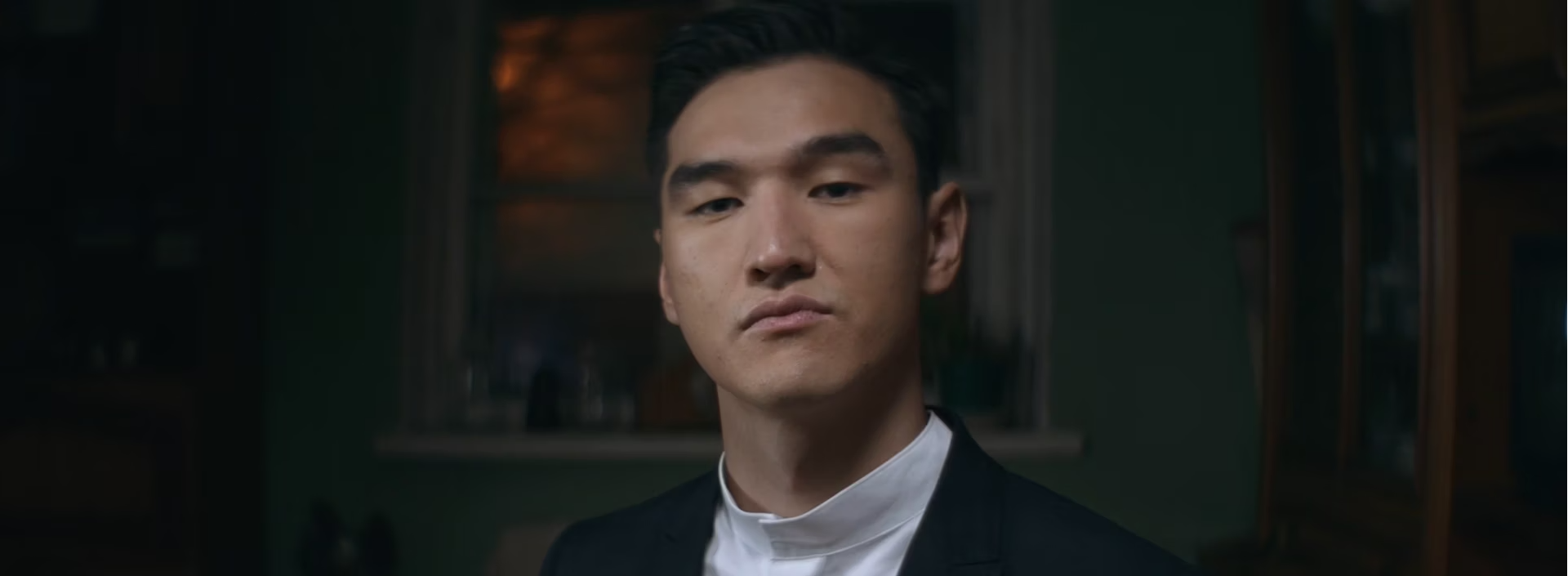
- Nurlan in 2018
- Born: Nurlan Alibekovich Saburov; December 22, 1991 (age 34); Stepnogorsk, Akmola Region, Kazakhstan
- Citizenship: Kazakhstan
- Education: Ural Federal University
- Occupations: Comedian; humorist; presenter
- Website: nurlansaburov.com

Nurlan Alibekovich Saburov (Note: Russian: Нурлан Алибекович Сабуров, Kazakh: Нұрлан Әлібекұлы Сабыров, Kazakh: Nūrlan Älıbekūly Sabyrov) (born 22 December 1991) is a Kazakh stand-up comedian.

In 2013, Saburov appeared in the "Open Mic" segment of the show "Stand Up" on the TNT TV channel. He has been hosting the show "What happened next?" on the YouTube channel "LABELCOM" since April 2019.

== Biography ==
Nurlan Saburov was born on 22 December 1991 in the town of Stepnogorsk, Kazakhstan. As a child he was fond of boxing. After leaving school he moved to Yekaterinburg to pursue higher education at the Ural Federal University, Faculty of Physical Education. Together with his friends, he organised comedic performances in bars and concert venues.

In late April 2019, the YouTube channel LABELCOM released the first episode of the comedy show "What was next?" hosted by Saburov, which currently has 7.52 million subscribers.

In May 2020, Forbes listed Saburov in its "30 under 30" New Media category. They list Saburov's performance fee at $10,000.

== Social position ==
In April 2022, while touring the United States, Saburov was accompanied by protests, shouts from the audience and speeches from the local Ukrainian diaspora demanding that the stand-up comedian speak out about the Russian invasion of Ukraine.

On April 15, 2022, a show which was to take place in the Chicago suburbs was postponed indefinitely.

In 2026, Russia barred Saburov from entering the country for 50 years, with authorities citing “the interest of national security” and the “protection of traditional values.”

== Personal life ==
Nurlan is married to Diana Saburova, whom he met as a student in Yekaterinburg. The couple have two children.

== Filmography ==
- 2017 – "Brother or Marriage"
- 2022 – "Stas"
