= Early Christianity =

Historical era of the Christian religion

Early Christianity, otherwise called the Early Church, describes the historical era of the Christian religion up to the First Council of Nicaea in 325 AD. Christianity spread from the Levant, across the Roman Empire, and beyond. Originally, this progression was closely connected to already established Jewish centers in the Holy Land and the Jewish diaspora throughout the Eastern Mediterranean. The first followers of Christianity were Jews who had converted to the faith, i.e. Jewish Christians, as well as Phoenicians. Early Christianity contains the Apostolic Age and is followed by, and substantially overlaps with, the Patristic era.

The Apostolic sees claim to have been founded by one or more of the apostles of Jesus, who are said to have dispersed from Jerusalem sometime after the crucifixion of Jesus, c. 33 AD, perhaps following the Great Commission. Early Christians gathered in small private houses, known as house churches, but a city's whole Christian community would also be called a "church"—the Greek noun ἐκκλησία (ekklesia) literally means "assembly", "gathering", or "congregation" but is translated as "church" in most English translations of the New Testament.

Many early Christians were merchants who had practical reasons for traveling to Asia Minor, Arabia, the Balkans, the Middle East, North Africa, and other regions. Over 40 such communities were established by the year 100, many in Anatolia, also known as Asia Minor, such as the Seven churches of Asia. By the end of the first century, Christianity had already spread to Rome, Ethiopia, Alexandria, Armenia, Greece, and Syria, serving as foundations for the expansive spread of Christianity, eventually throughout the world.

== History ==
=== Origins ===
==== Second Temple Judaism ====
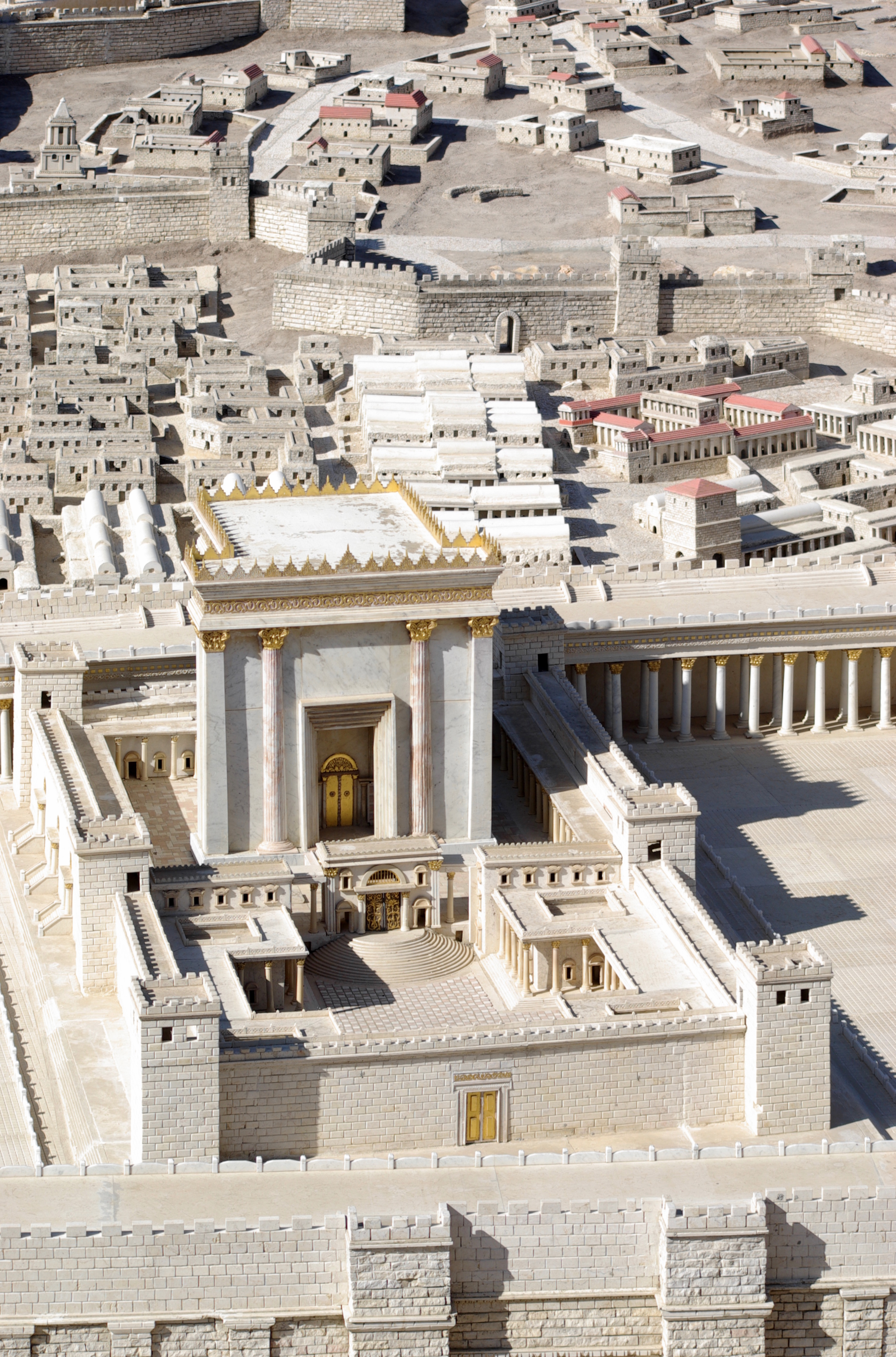
Model of the Second Temple in the Israel Museum

Christianity originated as a minor sect within Second Temple Judaism, the form of Judaism existing from the end of the Babylonian captivity (c. 598 – c. 537 BC) to the destruction of Jerusalem in 70 AD. The central tenets of Second Temple Judaism revolved around monotheism and the belief that Jews were a chosen people. The ancient Judeans believed that as part of their covenant with God, Jews were religiously obligated to obey the Torah. In return, they would be given the land of Israel and the city of Jerusalem, with their God dwelling in the Temple.

The Persian Empire ended the Babylonian captivity, permitting exiled Jews to return to their homeland and rebuild the Temple c. 516 BC. Nevertheless, the native Jewish monarchy was not restored. Instead, political power devolved to the high priest, who served as an intermediary between the Jewish people and the empire. This arrangement continued after the region was conquered by Alexander the Great (356–323 BC).

Alexander's conquests initiated the Hellenistic period when the Ancient Near East underwent Hellenization (the spread of Greek culture). Judaism was thereafter both culturally and politically part of the Hellenistic world; however, Hellenistic Judaism was stronger among diaspora Jews than among those living in the land of Israel. Diaspora Jews spoke Koine Greek, and the Jews of Alexandria produced a Greek translation of the Hebrew Bible called the Septuagint. The Septuagint was the translation of the Old Testament used by early Christians. Diaspora Jews continued to make pilgrimage to the Temple, but they started forming local religious institutions called synagogues as early as the 3rd century BC.

After Alexander's death, the region was ruled by Ptolemaic Egypt (c. 301 – c. 200 BC) and then the Seleucid Empire (c. 200 – c. 142 BC). The anti-Jewish policies of Antiochus IV Epiphanes (r. 175 – 164 BC) sparked the Maccabean Revolt in 167 BC, which culminated in the establishment of an independent Judea under the Hasmoneans, who ruled as kings and high priests. This independence would last until 63 BC when Judea became a client state of the Roman Empire.

Apocalyptic literature and thought had a major influence on Second Temple Judaism and early Christianity. Apocalypticism grew out of resistance to Hellenistic and later Roman rule. Apocalyptic writers considered themselves to be living in the end times and expected God to intervene in history, end the present sufferings, and restore his kingdom. Frequently, this was accomplished by a savior figure (such as a messiah or "Son of Man") who wins the final battle against the forces of evil and is appointed by God to rule. Messiah (Hebrew: meshiach) means "anointed" and is used in the Old Testament to designate Jewish kings and in some cases priests and prophets whose status was symbolized by being anointed with holy anointing oil. The term is most associated with King David, to whom God promised an eternal kingdom (2 Samuel 7:11–17). After the destruction of David's kingdom and lineage, this promise was reaffirmed by the prophets Isaiah, Jeremiah, and Ezekiel, who foresaw a future king from the House of David who would establish and reign over an idealized kingdom.

==== Jesus ====
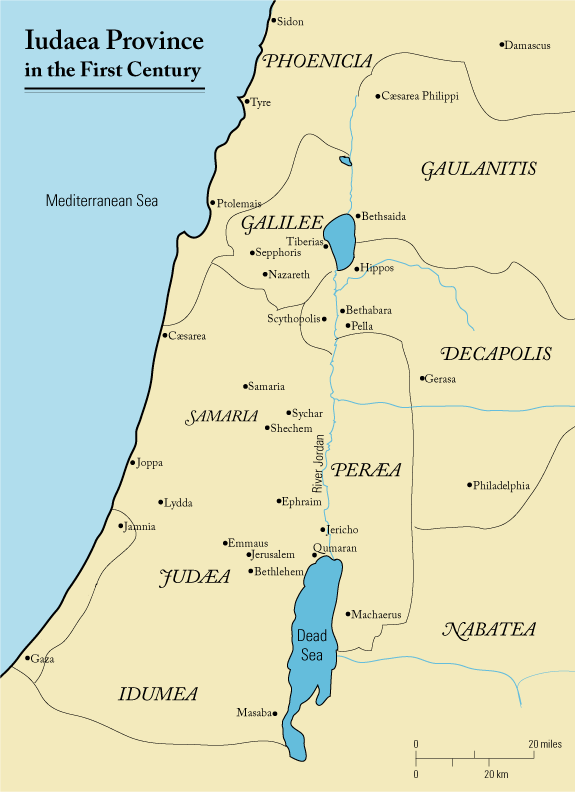
The Holy Land in the 1st century

Christianity centers on the life and ministry of Jesus of Nazareth, who lived c. 4 BC – c. AD 33. Jesus left no writings of his own, and most information about him comes from early Christian writings that now form part of the New Testament. The earliest of these are the Pauline epistles, letters written to various Christian congregations by Paul the Apostle in the 50s AD. The four canonical gospels of Matthew (c. AD 80 – c. AD 90), Mark (c. AD 70), Luke (c. AD 80 – c. AD 90), and John (written at the end of the 1st century) are ancient biographies of Jesus' life.

Jesus grew up in Nazareth, a village in Galilee. He started his public ministry when he was around 30 years old. Traveling through the Galilee, the Decapolis, and to Jerusalem, Jesus preached a message centered on the arrival of the Kingdom of God, mainly to the region's rural Jewish population, though he was likely not hostile to gentiles. He urged followers to repent in preparation for its coming and taught them how to live while waiting. This ethical teaching is summarized in the Lord's Prayer and the Great Commandment to love God and to "love your neighbor as yourself" (Matthew 22:37–39). Jesus chose twelve disciples, representing the twelve tribes of Israel, from among his followers. They symbolized the full restoration of Israel, including the Ten Lost Tribes, that would be accomplished through him.

The gospel accounts provide insight into what early Christians believed about Jesus. As the Christ or "Anointed One" (Greek: Christos), Jesus is identified as the fulfillment of messianic prophecies in the Hebrew scriptures. Through the accounts of his miraculous birth, the gospels present Jesus as the Son of God. The gospels describe the miracles of Jesus which served to authenticate his message and reveal a foretaste of the coming kingdom.

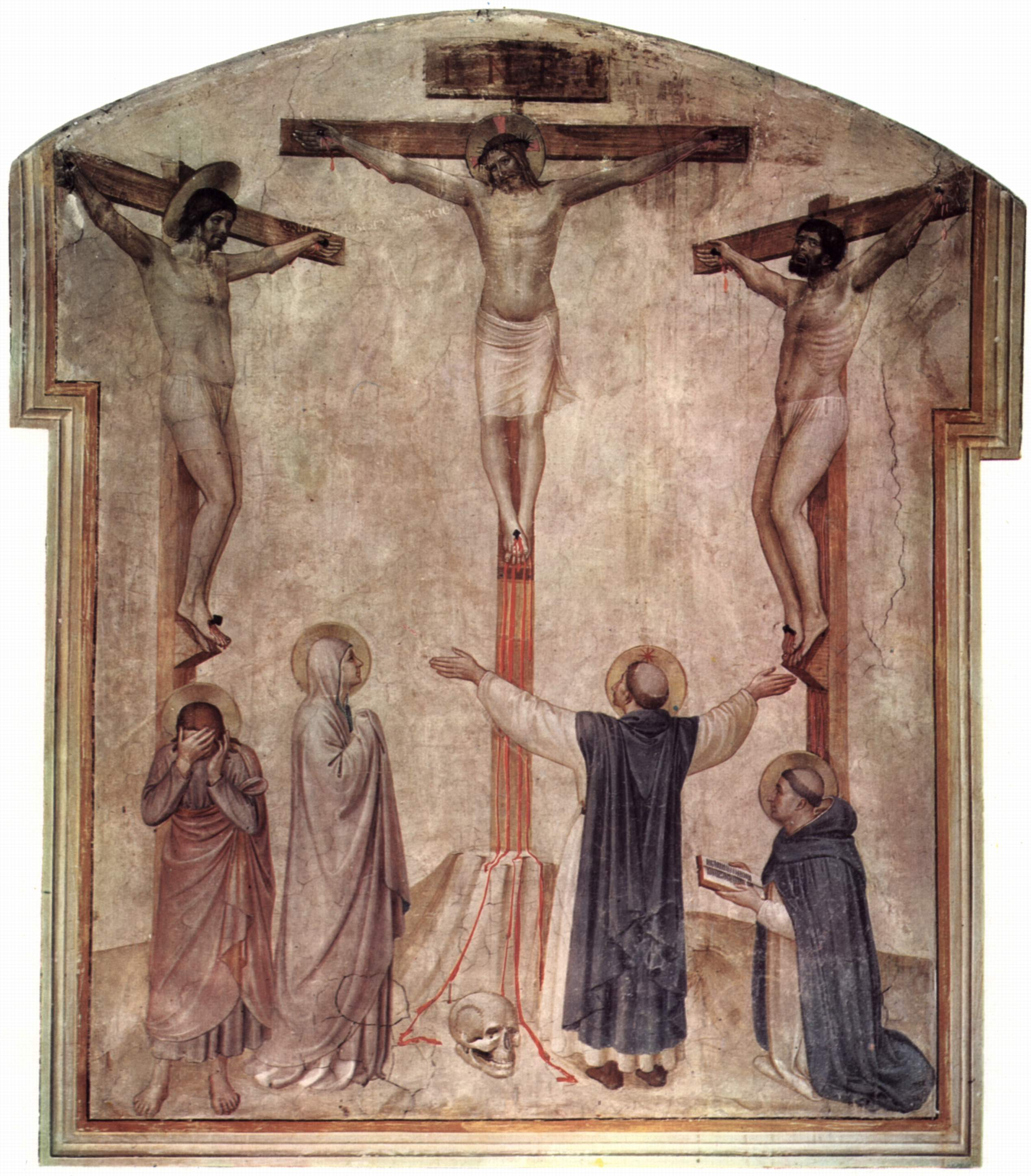
Christ with the Two Thieves by Fra Angelico c. 1437 – c. 1446

After three years of ministry, Jesus was crucified as a messianic pretender and insurgent. Paul, writing around 20 years after Jesus' death, provides the earliest account of the resurrection of Jesus in 1 Corinthians 15:3–8. The gospel accounts provide narratives of the resurrection, ultimately leading to the ascension of Jesus into Heaven. Jesus' victory over death became the central belief of Christianity. For his followers, Jesus inaugurated a New Covenant between God and his people. The Pauline epistles teach that Jesus makes salvation possible. Through faith, believers experience union with Jesus and both share in his suffering and the hope of his resurrection.

While they do not provide new information, non-Christian sources do confirm certain information found in the gospels. The Jewish historian Josephus referenced Jesus in his Antiquities of the Jews written c. AD 95. The paragraph, known as the Testimonium Flavianum, provides a brief summary of Jesus' life, but the original text has been altered by Christian interpolation. The first Roman author to reference Jesus is Tacitus (c. AD 56 – c. AD 120), who wrote that Christians "took their name from Christus who was executed in the reign of Tiberius by the procurator Pontius Pilate".

=== 1st century ===
The decades after the crucifixion of Jesus are known as the Apostolic Age because the Disciples (also known as Apostles) were still alive. Important Christian sources for this period are the Pauline epistles and the Acts of the Apostles, as well as the Didache and the Church Fathers' writings.

==== Initial spread ====
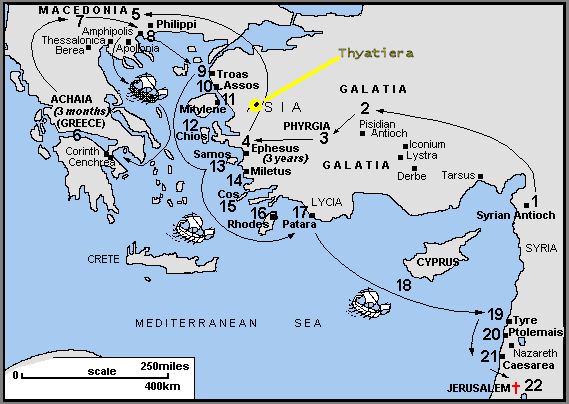
Map of Paul's 3rd missionary journey

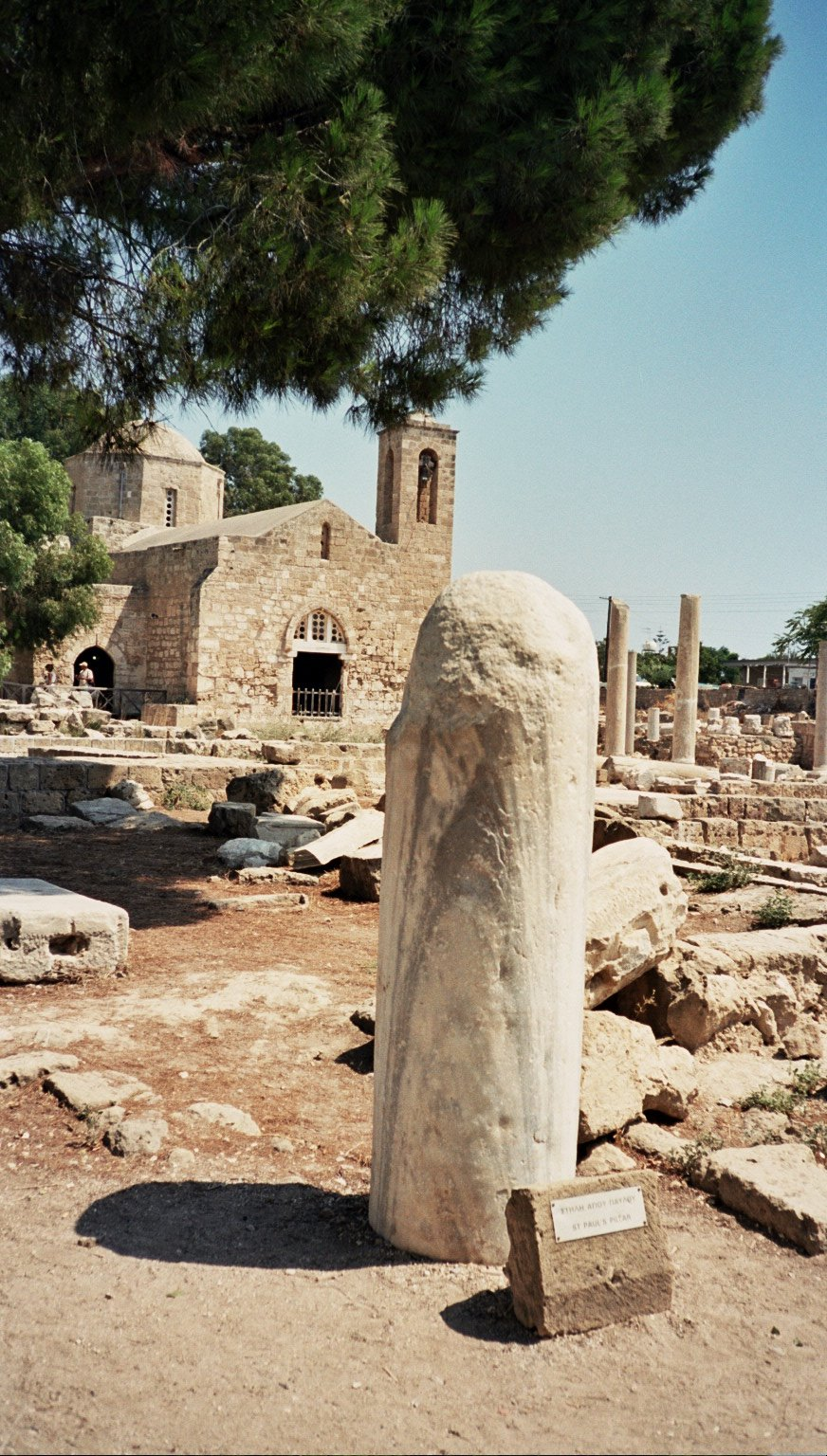
St Paul's Pillar in Paphos

After the death of Jesus, his followers established Christian groups in cities, such as Jerusalem. The movement quickly spread to Damascus and Antioch, capital of Roman Syria and one of the most important cities in the empire. Early Christians referred to themselves as brethren, disciples or saints, but it was in Antioch, according to Acts 11:26, that they were first called Christians (Greek: Christianoi).

According to the New Testament, Paul the apostle established Christian communities throughout the Mediterranean world. He is known to have also spent some time in Arabia (Galatians 1:17). After preaching in Syria, he turned his attention to the cities of Asia Minor. By the early 50s, he had moved on to Europe where he stopped in Philippi and then traveled to Thessalonica in Roman Macedonia. He then moved into mainland Greece, spending time in Athens and Corinth. While in Corinth, Paul wrote his Epistle to the Romans, indicating that there were already Christian groups in Rome. Some of these groups had been started by Paul's missionary associates Priscilla and Aquila and Epainetus.

Social and professional networks played an important part in spreading the religion as members invited interested outsiders to secret Christian assemblies (Greek: ekklēsia) that met in private homes (see house church). Commerce and trade also played a role in Christianity's spread as Christian merchants traveled for business. Christianity appealed to marginalized groups (women, slaves) with its message that "in Christ there is neither Jew nor Greek, neither male nor female, neither slave nor free" (Galatians 3:28). Christians also provided social services to the poor, sick, and widows. Women actively contributed to the Christian faith as disciples, missionaries, and more due to the large acceptance early Christianity offered.

Historian Keith Hopkins estimated that by AD 100 there were around 7,000 Christians (about 0.01 percent of the Roman Empire's population of 60 million). Separate Christian groups maintained contact with each other through letters, visits from itinerant preachers, and the sharing of common texts, some of which were later collected in the New Testament.

==== Jerusalem church ====
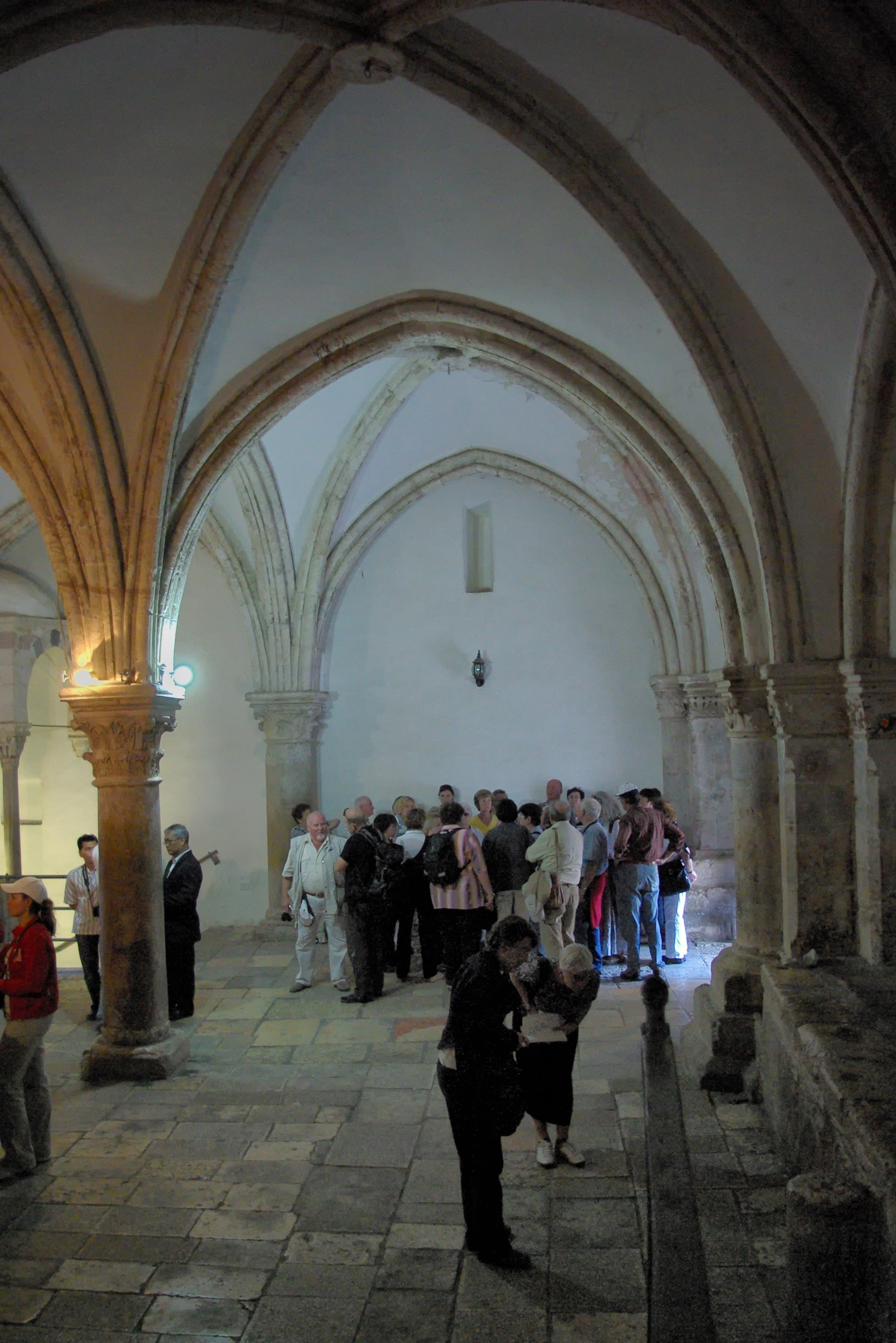
The Cenacle on Mount Zion, claimed to be the location of the Last Supper and Pentecost. Bargil Pixner claims the original Church of the Apostles is located under the current structure.

Jerusalem was the first center of the Christian Church according to the Book of Acts. The apostles lived and taught there for some time after Pentecost. According to Acts, the early church was led by the Apostles, foremost among them Peter and John. When Peter left Jerusalem after Herod Agrippa I tried to kill him, James, brother of Jesus appears as the leader of the Jerusalem church. Clement of Alexandria (c. 150–215 AD) called him Bishop of Jerusalem. Peter, John and James were collectively recognized as the three pillars of the church (Galatians 2:9).

At this early date, Christianity was still a Jewish sect. Christians in Jerusalem kept the Jewish Sabbath and continued to worship at the Temple. In commemoration of Jesus' resurrection, they gathered on Sunday for a communion meal. Initially, Christians kept the Jewish custom of fasting on Mondays and Thursdays. Later, the Christian fast days shifted to Wednesdays and Fridays (see Friday fast) in remembrance of Judas' betrayal and the crucifixion.

James was killed on the order of the high priest in AD 62. He was succeeded as leader of the Jerusalem church by Simeon, another relative of Jesus. During the First Jewish-Roman War (AD 66–73), Jerusalem and the Temple were destroyed after a brutal siege in AD 70. Prophecies of the Second Temple's destruction are found in the synoptic gospels, specifically in the Olivet Discourse.

According to a tradition preserved by Eusebius and Epiphanius of Salamis, the Jerusalem church fled to Pella at the outbreak of the First Jewish Revolt, reportedly in response to divine instruction. This account has been questioned by modern scholars, particularly in light of evidence that Pella was sacked by Jewish rebels during the early stages of the revolt. The fate of the community is uncertain: it may have been killed, taken captive, or forcibly removed during the destruction of Jerusalem. Another theory holds that its members surrendered to the Romans and were resettled in Pella. By AD 135, however, the church had returned to Jerusalem, though these disruptions appear to have significantly weakened its influence within the broader Christian movement.

James the Just, brother of Jesus, was leader of the early Christian community in Jerusalem, and it is believed that his other kinsmen continued to hold positions of authority in the area following the destruction of the city. This tradition, however, may reflect an effort to construct an unbroken line of succession from earliest Christianity to the time of Eusebius. According to the traditional account, such leadership persisted until the refoundation of Jerusalem as Aelia Capitolina under Hadrian in the 130s AD, after which Jews were barred from the city in the aftermath of the Bar Kokhba Revolt.

==== Gentile Christians ====
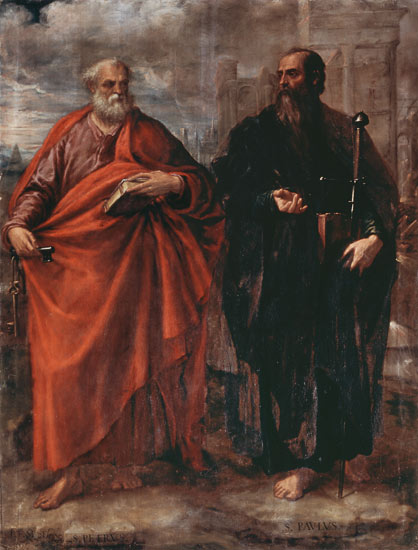
Saint Peter and Saint Paul (1570s) by Juan Fernández Navarrete

The first Gentiles to become Christians were God-fearers, people who believed in the truth of Judaism but had not become proselytes (see Cornelius the Centurion). As Gentiles joined the young Christian movement, the question of whether they should convert to Judaism and observe the Torah (such as food laws, male circumcision, and Sabbath observance) gave rise to various answers. Some Christians demanded full observance of the Torah and required Gentile converts to become Jews. Others, such as Paul, believed that the Torah was no longer binding because of Jesus' death and resurrection. In the middle were Christians who believed Gentiles should follow some of the Torah but not all of it.

In c. 48–50 AD, Barnabas and Paul went to Jerusalem to meet with the three Pillars of the Church: James the Just, Peter, and John. Later called the Council of Jerusalem, according to Pauline Christians, this meeting (among other things) confirmed the legitimacy of the evangelizing mission of Barnabas and Paul to the Gentiles. It also confirmed that Gentile converts were not obligated to follow the Mosaic Law, especially the practice of male circumcision, which was condemned as execrable and repulsive in the Greco-Roman world during the period of Hellenization of the Eastern Mediterranean, and was especially adversed in Classical civilization from ancient Greeks and Romans, who valued the foreskin positively. The resulting Apostolic Decree in Acts 15 is theorized to parallel the seven Noahide laws found in the Old Testament. However, modern scholars dispute the connection between Acts 15 and the seven Noahide laws. In roughly the same time period, rabbinic Jewish legal authorities made their circumcision requirement for Jewish boys even stricter.

The primary issue which was addressed related to the requirement of circumcision, as the author of Acts relates, but other important matters arose as well, as the Apostolic Decree indicates. The dispute was between those, such as the followers of the "Pillars of the Church", led by James, who believed, following his interpretation of the Great Commission, that the church must observe the Torah, i.e. the rules of traditional Judaism, and Paul the Apostle, who called himself "Apostle to the Gentiles", who believed there was no such necessity. The main concern for the Apostle Paul, which he subsequently expressed in greater detail with his letters directed to the early Christian communities in Asia Minor, was the inclusion of Gentiles into God's New Covenant, sending the message that faith in Christ is sufficient for salvation. (See also: Supersessionism, New Covenant, Antinomianism, Hellenistic Judaism, and Paul the Apostle and Judaism).

The Council of Jerusalem did not end the dispute, however. There are indications that James still believed the Torah was binding on Jewish Christians. Galatians 2:11–14 describes "people from James" causing Peter and other Jewish Christians in Antioch to break table fellowship with Gentiles. (See also: Incident at Antioch). Joel Marcus, professor of Christian origins, suggests that Peter's position may have lain somewhere between James and Paul, but that he probably leaned more toward James. This is the start of a split between Jewish Christianity and Gentile (or Pauline) Christianity. While Jewish Christianity would remain important through the next few centuries, it would ultimately be pushed to the margins as Gentile Christianity became dominant. Jewish Christianity was also opposed by early Rabbinic Judaism, the successor to the Pharisees. When Peter left Jerusalem after Herod Agrippa I tried to kill him, James appears as the principal authority of the early Christian church. Clement of Alexandria (c. 150–215 AD) called him Bishop of Jerusalem. A 2nd-century church historian, Hegesippus, wrote that the Sanhedrin martyred him in AD 62.

In 66 AD, the Jews revolted against Rome. After a brutal siege, Jerusalem fell in AD 70. The city, including the Jewish Temple, was destroyed and the population was mostly killed or removed. According to a tradition recorded by Eusebius and Epiphanius of Salamis, the Jerusalem church fled to Pella at the outbreak of the First Jewish Revolt. According to Epiphanius of Salamis, the Cenacle survived at least to Hadrian's visit in AD 130. A scattered population survived. The Sanhedrin relocated to Jamnia. Prophecies of the Second Temple's destruction are found in the Synoptic Gospels, specifically in Jesus's Olivet Discourse.

==== 1st century persecution ====
Romans had a negative perception of early Christians. The Roman historian Tacitus wrote that Christians were despised for their "abominations" and "hatred of humankind". The belief that Christians hated humankind could refer to their refusal to participate in social activities connected to pagan worship—these included most social activities such as the theater, the army, sports, and classical literature. They also refused to worship the Roman emperor, like Jews. Nonetheless, Romans were more lenient to Jews compared to Gentile Christians. Some anti-Christian Romans further distinguished between Jews and Christians by claiming that Christianity was "apostasy" from Judaism. Celsus, for example, considered Jewish Christians to be hypocrites for claiming that they embraced their Jewish heritage.

Emperor Nero persecuted Christians in Rome, whom he blamed for starting the Great Fire of AD 64. It is possible that Peter and Paul were in Rome and were martyred at this time. Nero was deposed in AD 68, and the persecution of Christians ceased. Under the emperors Vespasian (r. 69–79) and Titus (r. 79–81), Christians were largely ignored by the Roman government. The Emperor Domitian (r. 81–96) authorized a new persecution against the Christians. It was at this time that the Book of Revelation was written by John of Patmos.

== Early centers ==
=== Eastern Roman Empire ===
==== Jerusalem ====
A diagram of the Church of the Holy Sepulchre based on a German documentary. The church is claimed to be at the site of Calvary and the Tomb of Jesus.

In the 2nd century, Roman Emperor Hadrian rebuilt Jerusalem as a Pagan city and renamed it Aelia Capitolina, erecting statues of Jupiter and himself on the site of the former Jewish Temple, the Temple Mount. In the years AD 132–136, Bar Kokhba led an unsuccessful revolt as a Jewish Messiah claimant, but Christians refused to acknowledge him as such. When Bar Kokhba was defeated, Hadrian barred Jews from the city, except for the day of Tisha B'Av, thus the subsequent Jerusalem bishops were Gentiles ("uncircumcised") for the first time.

The general significance of Jerusalem to Christians entered a period of decline during the persecution of Christians in the Roman Empire. According to Eusebius, Jerusalem Christians escaped to Pella, in the Decapolis (Transjordan), at the beginning of the First Jewish–Roman War in AD 66. Jerusalem's bishops became suffragans (subordinates) of the Metropolitan bishop in nearby Caesarea. Interest in Jerusalem resumed with the pilgrimage of the Roman Empress Helena to the Holy Land (c. 326–328 AD). According to the church historian Socrates of Constantinople, Helena (with the assistance of Bishop Macarius of Jerusalem) claimed to have found the cross of Christ, after removing a Temple to Venus (attributed to Hadrian) that had been built over the site. Jerusalem had received special recognition in Canon VII of the First Council of Nicaea in AD 325. The traditional founding date for the Brotherhood of the Holy Sepulchre (which guards the Christian Holy places in the Holy Land) is 313, which corresponds with the date of the Edict of Milan promulgated by the Roman Emperor Constantine the Great, which legalized Christianity in the Roman Empire. Jerusalem was later named as one of the Pentarchy, but this was never accepted by the Church of Rome. (See also: East–West Schism#Prospects for reconciliation).

==== Antioch ====
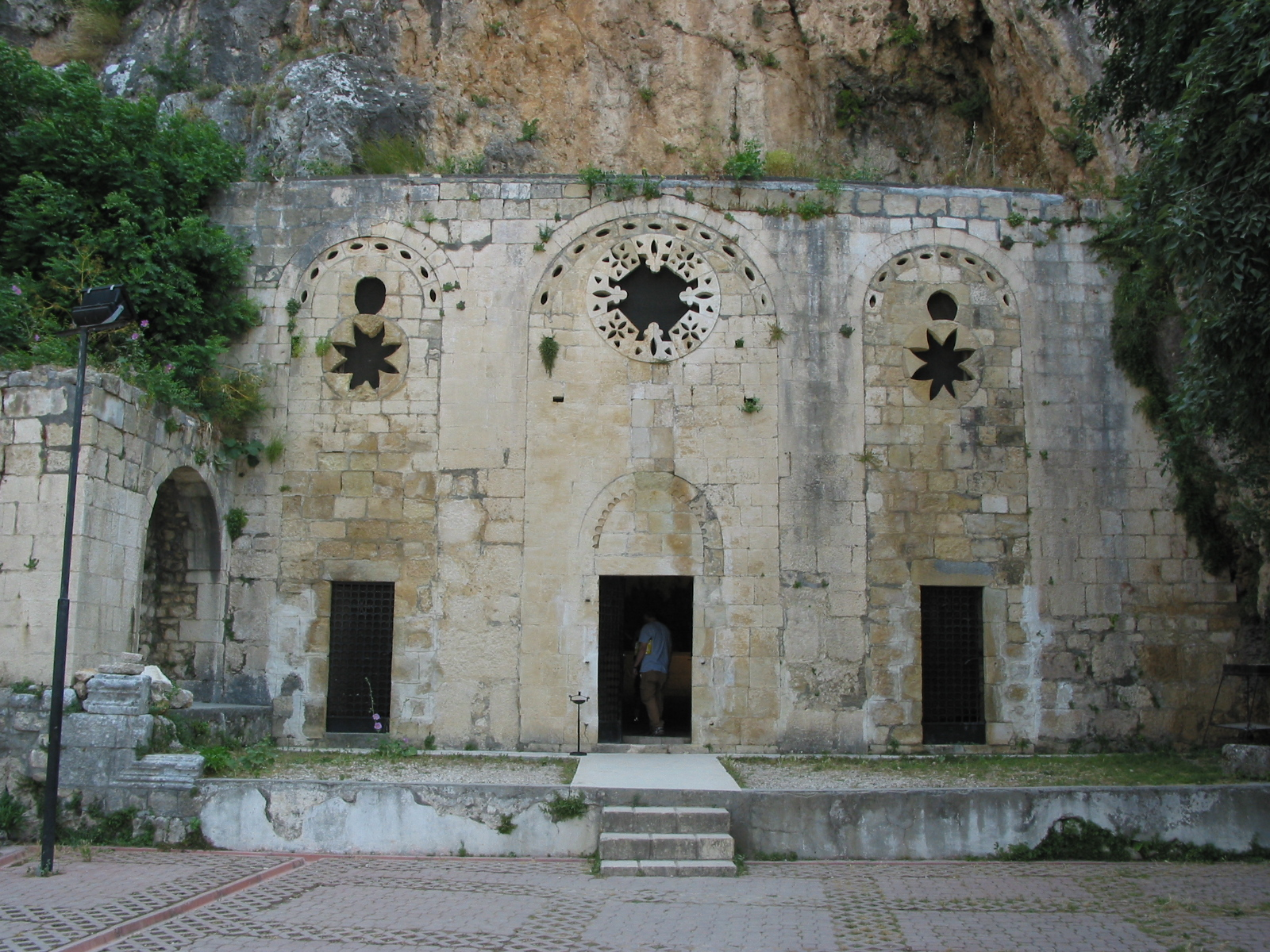
The Church of St Peter near Antioch, Anatolia, said to be the spot where Saint Peter first preached the Gospel in Roman Antioch

Antioch (modern Antakya, Turkey) was the capital of the Roman province of Syria and a center of Greek culture in the Eastern Mediterranean, as well as a key locus of trade that made it the third-most important city of the Roman Empire. In the Book of Acts, it is said that it was at Antioch where followers of Jesus were first called Christians; it was also the location of the Incident at Antioch, described in the Epistle to the Galatians. It was the site of an early church traditionally said to be founded by Peter; later traditions also attributed the role of Bishop of Antioch as first being held by Peter. The Gospel of Matthew and the Apostolic Constitutions may have been written there. The church father Ignatius of Antioch was its third bishop. The School of Antioch, founded in 270, was one of two major centers of early church learning. The Curetonian Gospels and the Syriac Sinaiticus are two early (pre-Peshitta) New Testament text types associated with Syriac Christianity. It was one of the three whose bishops were recognized at the First Council of Nicaea (325) as exercising jurisdiction over the adjoining territories.

==== Alexandria ====
The city of Alexandria in the Nile delta was established by Alexander the Great in 331 BC. Its famous libraries made it a center of Hellenistic learning. The Septuagint translation of the Old Testament began there, and the Alexandrian text-type is recognized by scholars as one of the earliest New Testament types. It had a significant Jewish population, of which Philo of Alexandria is probably the most known author. It produced superior scripture and notable church fathers, such as Clement, Origen, and Athanasius; Edward Gibbon wrote that Alexandria made major contributions to Christian theology. Also noteworthy were the Desert Fathers of Egypt.

By the end of the early-Christian era, Alexandria, Rome, and Antioch were accorded authority over nearby metropolitans. The Council of Nicaea in canon VI affirmed Alexandria's traditional authority over Egypt, Libya, and Pentapolis (North Africa) (the Diocese of Egypt) and probably granted Alexandria the right to declare a universal date for the observance of Easter (see also Easter controversy). Some postulate that Alexandria was not only a center of Christianity, but was also, as a cradle of Gnosticism, a center for Christian-based Gnostic sects.

==== Asia Minor ====
Map of Western Anatolia showing the "Seven Churches of Asia" and the Greek island of Patmos

The tradition of John the Apostle was strong in Anatolia (the near-east, part of modern Turkey, the western part was called the Roman province of Asia). Most critical commentaries agree the gospel of John was likely composed in Ephesus. The authorship of the Johannine works traditionally and plausibly occurred in Ephesus, c. 90–110, although some scholars argue for an origin in Syria. This includes the Book of Revelation, although modern Bible scholars believe that it to be authored by a different John, John of Patmos (a Greek island about 30 miles off the Anatolian coast), that mentions Seven churches of Asia. According to the New Testament, the Apostle Paul was from Tarsus (in south-central Anatolia) and his missionary journeys were primarily in Anatolia. The First Epistle of Peter (1:1–2) is addressed to Anatolian regions. On the southeast shore of the Black Sea, Pontus was a Greek colony mentioned three times in the New Testament. Inhabitants of Pontus were some of the first converts to Christianity. Pliny, governor in 110, in his letters, addressed Christians in Pontus. Of the extant letters of Ignatius of Antioch considered authentic, five of seven are to Anatolian cities, the sixth is to Polycarp. Smyrna was home to Polycarp, the bishop who reportedly knew the Apostle John personally, and probably also to his student Irenaeus. Papias of Hierapolis is also believed to have been a student of John the Apostle. In the 2nd century, Anatolia was home to Quartodecimanism, Montanism, Marcion of Sinope, and Melito of Sardis who recorded an early Christian Biblical canon. After the Crisis of the Third Century, Nicomedia became the capital of the Eastern Roman Empire in 286. The Synod of Ancyra was held in 314. In 325 the emperor Constantine convoked the first Christian ecumenical council in Nicaea and in 330 moved the capital of the reunified empire to Byzantium (also an early Christian center and just across the Bosphorus from Anatolia, later called Constantinople), referred to as the Byzantine Empire, which lasted till 1453. The First seven Ecumenical Councils were held either in Western Anatolia or across the Bosphorus in Constantinople.

==== Caesarea ====
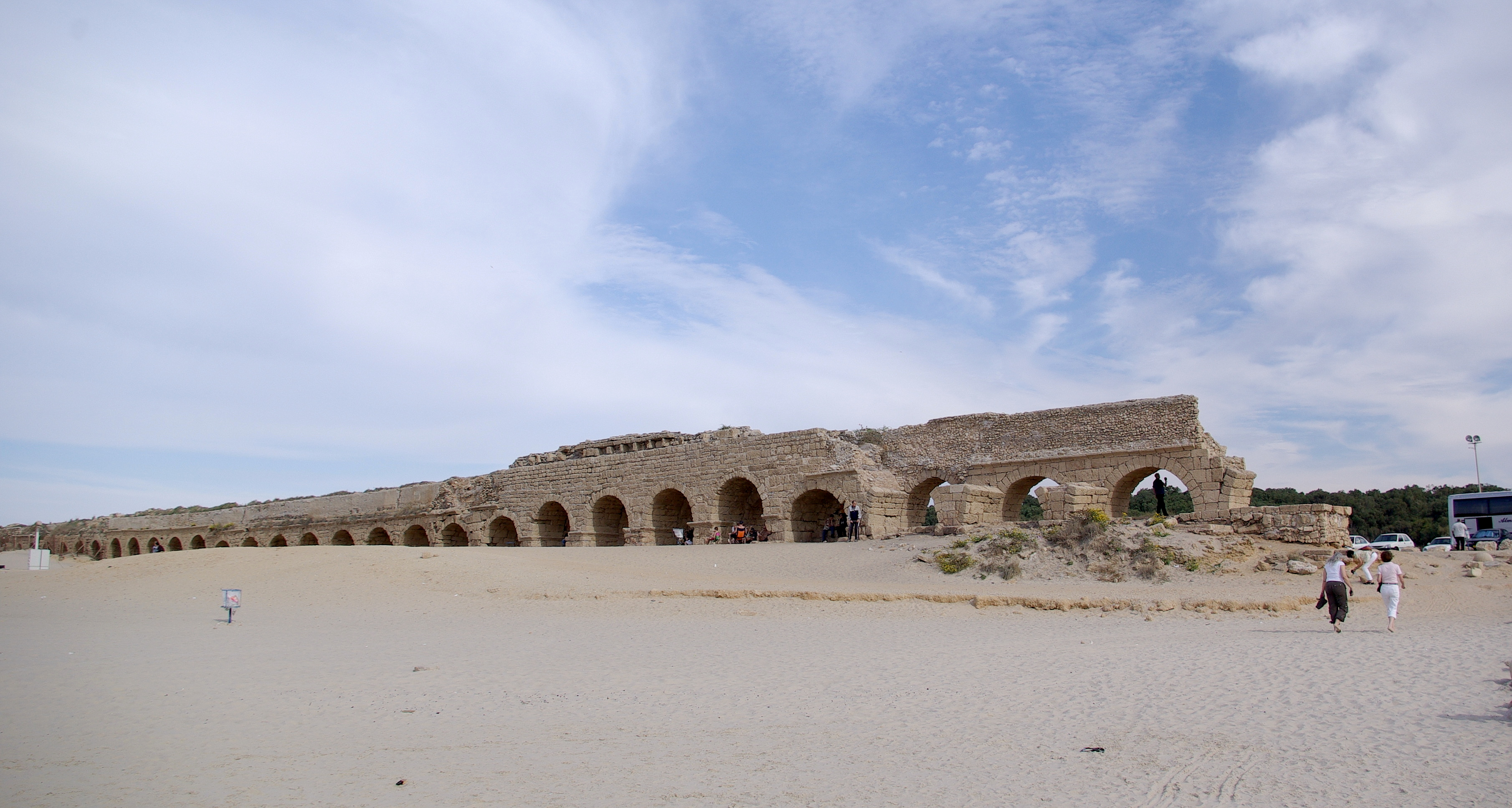
Remains of the ancient Roman aqueduct in Caesarea Maritima

Caesarea, on the seacoast just northwest of Jerusalem, at first Caesarea Maritima, then after 133 Caesarea Palaestina, was built by Herod the Great, c. 25–13 BC, and was the capital of Iudaea Province (6–132) and later Palaestina Prima. It was there that Peter baptized the centurion Cornelius, considered the first gentile convert. Paul sought refuge there, once staying at the house of Philip the Evangelist, and later being imprisoned there for two years (estimated to be 57–59). The Apostolic Constitutions (7.46) state that the first Bishop of Caesarea was Zacchaeus the Publican.

After Hadrian's siege of Jerusalem (c. 133), Caesarea became the metropolitan see with the bishop of Jerusalem as one of its "suffragans" (subordinates). Origen (d. 254) compiled his Hexapla there and it held a famous library and theological school, St. Pamphilus (d. 309) was a noted scholar-priest. St. Gregory the Wonder-Worker (d. 270), St. Basil the Great (d. 379), and St. Jerome (d. 420) visited and studied at the library which was later destroyed, probably by the Persians in 614 or the Saracens around 637. The first major church historian, Eusebius of Caesarea, was a bishop, c. 314–339. F. J. A. Hort and Adolf von Harnack have argued that the Nicene Creed originated in Caesarea. The Caesarean text-type is recognized by many textual scholars as one of the earliest New Testament types.

==== Cyprus ====
Paphos was the capital of the island of Cyprus during the Roman years and seat of a Roman commander. In AD 45, the apostles Paul and Barnabas, who according to Acts 4:36 was "a native of Cyprus", came to Cyprus and reached Paphos preaching the message of Jesus, see also Acts 13:4–13. According to Acts, the apostles were persecuted by the Romans but eventually succeeded in convincing the Roman commander Sergius Paulus to renounce his old religion in favour of Christianity. Barnabas is traditionally identified as the founder of the Cypriot Orthodox Church.

==== Damascus ====
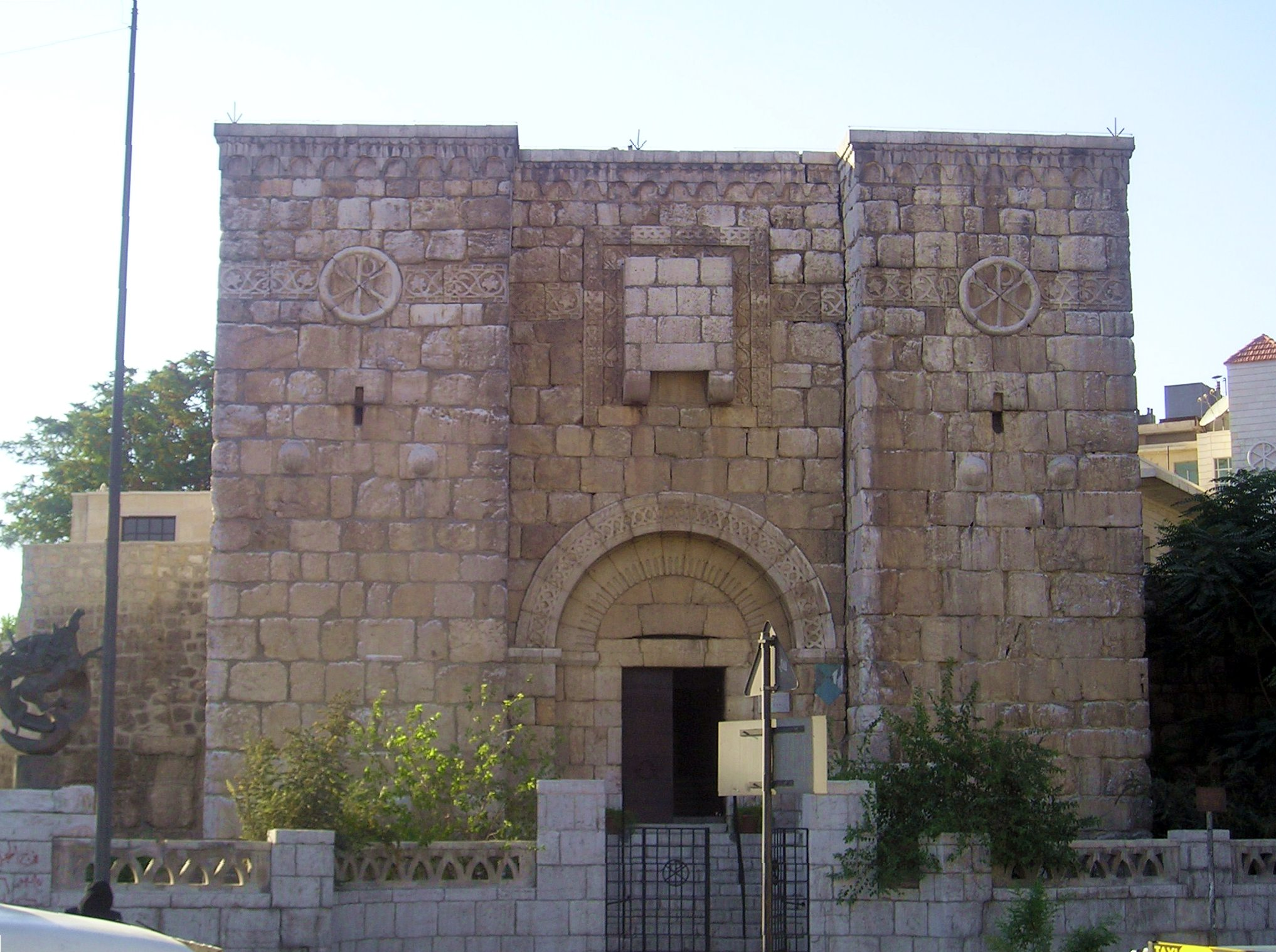
The Chapel of Saint Paul, said to be Bab Kisan where St. Paul escaped from Old Damascus

Damascus is the capital of Syria and claims to be the oldest continuously inhabited city in the world. According to the New Testament, the Apostle Paul was converted on the Road to Damascus. In the three accounts (Acts 9:1–20, 22:1–22, 26:1–24), he is described as being led by those he was traveling with, blinded by the light, to Damascus where his sight was restored by a disciple called Ananias (who is thought to have been the first bishop of Damascus) then he was baptized.

==== Ethiopia ====
The Ethiopian Orthodox Tewahedo Church is one of the largest and oldest Christian churches in Africa; only surpassed in age by the Church of the East, the Armenian Apostolic Church, the Syriac Orthodox Church, the Greek Orthodox Church, and the Coptic Church of Egypt. It has a membership of 32 to 36 million, the majority of whom live in Ethiopia, and is thus the largest of all Oriental Orthodox churches. Next in size are the various Protestant congregations who include 13.7 million Ethiopians. The largest Protestant group is the Ethiopian Evangelical Church Mekane Yesus, with about 5 million members. Catholicism has been present in Ethiopia since the nineteenth century, and numbers over 530,000 believers as of the 2007 census. In total, Christians make up about 63% of the total population of the country.

==== Greece ====
Thessalonica, the major northern Greek city where it is believed Christianity was founded by Paul, thus an Apostolic See, and the surrounding regions of Macedonia, Thrace, and Epirus, which also extend into the neighboring Balkan states of Albania and Bulgaria, were early centers of Christianity. Of note are Paul's Epistles to the Thessalonians and to Philippi, which is often considered the first contact of Christianity with Europe. The Apostolic Father Polycarp wrote a letter to the Philippians, c. 125.

Nicopolis was a city in the Roman province of Epirus Vetus, today a ruin on the northern part of the western Greek coast. In the Epistle to Titus, Paul said he intended to go there. It is possible that there were some Christians in its population. According to Eusebius, Origen (c. 185–254) stayed there for some time

Ancient Corinth, today a ruin near modern Corinth in southern Greece, was an early center of Christianity. According to the Acts of Apostles, Paul stayed eighteen months in Corinth to preach. He initially stayed with Aquila and Priscilla, and was later joined by Silas and Timothy. After he left Corinth, Apollos was sent from Ephesus by Priscilla to replace him. Paul returned to Corinth at least once. He wrote the First Epistle to the Corinthians from Ephesus approximately in 54–55, which focused on sexual immorality, divorces, lawsuits, and resurrections. The Second Epistle to the Corinthians from Macedonia was written around 56 as a fourth letter discussing his proposed plans for the future, instructions, unity, and his defense of apostolic authority. The earliest evidence of the primacy of the Roman Church can be seen in the First Epistle of Clement written to the Corinthian church, dated around 96. Bishops in Corinth include Dionysius and Bacchylus.

Athens, the capital and largest city in Greece, was visited by Paul. He probably traveled by sea, arriving at Piraeus, the harbor of Athens, coming from Berœa of Macedonia around the year 53. According to Acts 17, when he arrived at Athens, he immediately sent for Silas and Timotheos who had stayed behind in Berœa. While waiting for them, Paul explored Athens and visited the synagogue, as there was a local Jewish community. A Christian community was quickly established in Athens, although it may not have been large initially. A common tradition identifies the Areopagite as the first bishop of the Christian community in Athens, while another tradition mentions Hierotheos the Thesmothete. The succeeding bishops were not all of Athenian descent: Narkissos was believed to have come from Palestine, and Publius from Malta. Quadratus is known for an apology addressed to Emperor Hadrian during his visit to Athens, contributing to early Christian literature. Aristeides and Athenagoras also wrote apologies during this time. By the second century, Athens likely had a significant Christian community, as Hygeinos, bishop of Rome, write a letter to the community in Athens in the year 139.

Gortyn on Crete was allied with Rome and was thus made capital of Roman Creta et Cyrenaica. St. Titus is believed to have been the first bishop. The city was sacked by the pirate Abu Hafs in 828.

==== Thrace ====
Paul the Apostle preached in Macedonia, and also in Philippi, located in Thrace on the Thracian Sea coast. According to Hippolytus of Rome, Andrew the Apostle preached in Thrace, on the Black Sea coast and along the lower course of the Danube River. The spread of Christianity among the Thracians and the emergence of centers of Christianity like Serdica (present day Sofia), Philippopolis (present day Plovdiv) and Durostorum (present day Silistra) was likely to have begun with these early Apostolic missions. The first Christian monastery in Europe was founded in Thrace in 344 by Saint Athanasius near modern-day Chirpan, Bulgaria, following the Council of Serdica.

==== Libya ====
Cyrene and the surrounding region of Cyrenaica or the North African "Pentapolis", south of the Mediterranean from Greece, the northeastern part of modern Libya, was a Greek colony in North Africa later converted to a Roman province. In addition to Greeks and Romans, there was also a significant Jewish population, at least up to the Kitos War (115–117). According to Mark 15:21, Simon of Cyrene carried Jesus' cross. Cyrenians are also mentioned in Acts 2:10, 6:9, 11:20, 13:1. According to Byzantine legend, the first bishop was Lucius, mentioned in Acts 13:1.

=== Western Roman Empire ===
==== Rome ====
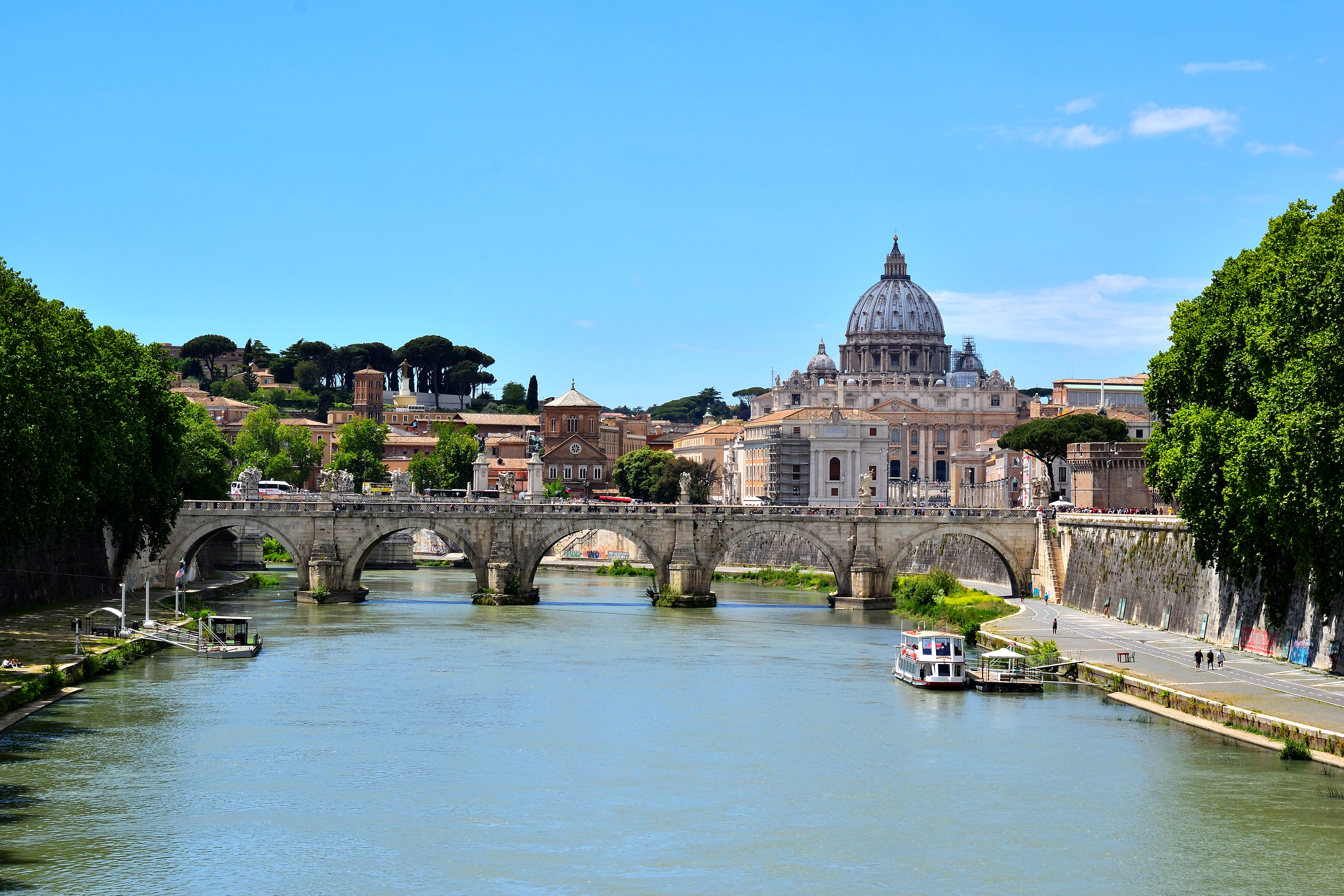
St. Peter's Basilica, believed to be the burial site of St. Peter, seen from the River Tiber

Exactly when Christians first appeared in Rome is difficult to determine. The Acts of the Apostles claims that the Jewish Christian couple Priscilla and Aquila had recently come from Rome to Corinth when, in about the year 50, Paul reached the latter city, indicating that belief in Jesus in Rome had preceded Paul.

Historians consistently consider Peter and Paul to have been martyred in Rome under the reign of Nero in 64, after the Great Fire of Rome which, according to Tacitus, the Emperor blamed on the Christians. In the second century, Irenaeus of Lyons, reflecting the ancient view that the church could not be fully present anywhere without a bishop, recorded that Peter and Paul had been the founders of the Church in Rome and had appointed Linus as bishop.

However, Irenaeus does not say that either Peter or Paul was "bishop" of the Church in Rome and several historians have questioned whether Peter spent much time in Rome before his martyrdom. While the church in Rome was already flourishing when Paul wrote his Epistle to the Romans to them from Corinth (c. 58) he attests to a large Christian community already there and greets some fifty people in Rome by name, but not Peter, whom he knew. There is also no mention of Peter in Rome later during Paul's two-year stay there in Acts 28, about 60–62. Most likely he did not spend any major time at Rome before 58 when Paul wrote to the Romans, and so it may have been only in the 60s and relatively shortly before his martyrdom that Peter came to the capital.

The Lutheran scholar Oscar Cullmann sharply rejected the claim that Peter began the papal succession, and concludes that while Peter was the original head of the apostles, Peter was not the founder of any visible church succession.

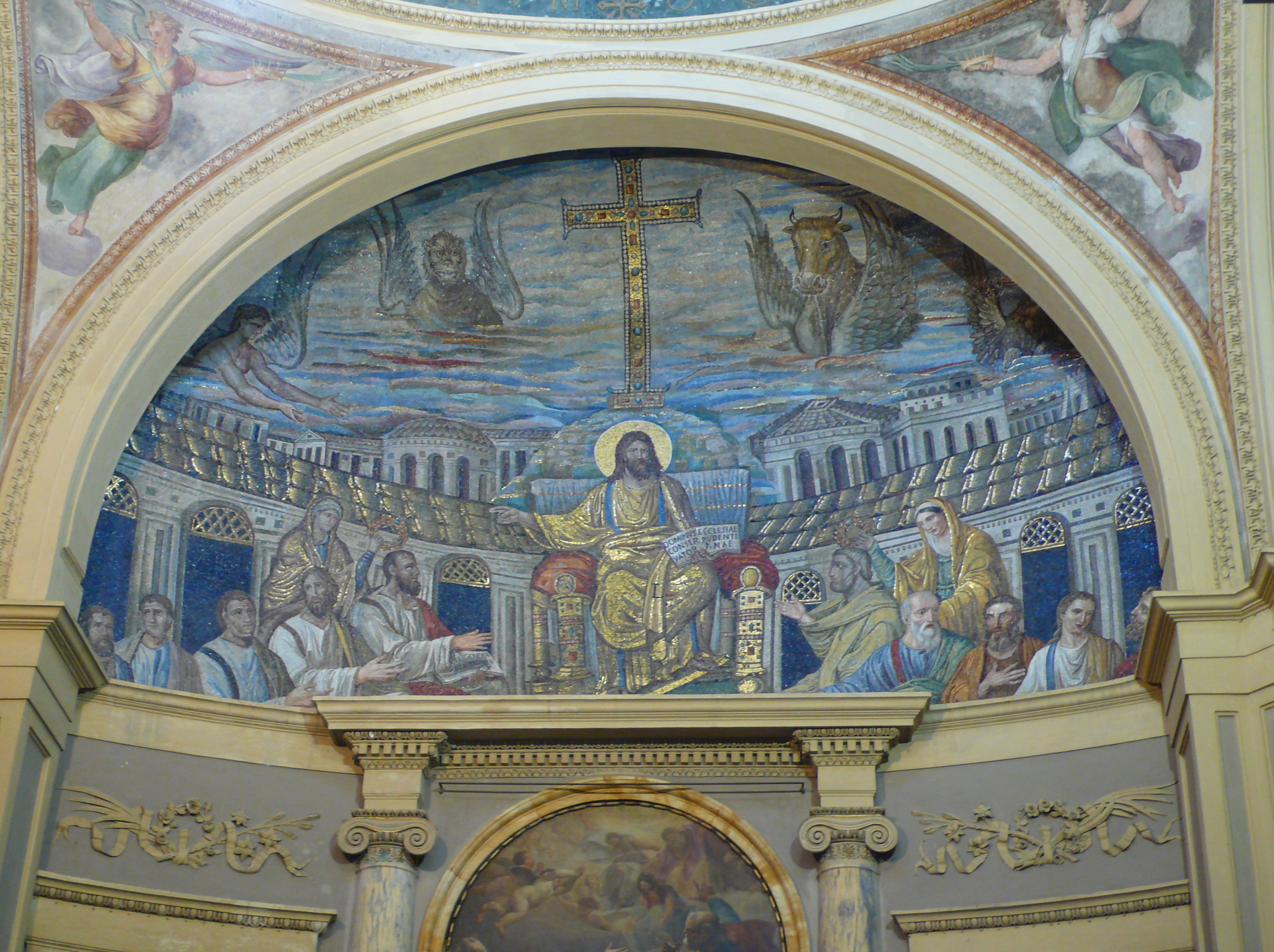
A scene showing Christ Pantocrator from a Roman mosaic in the church of Santa Pudenziana in Rome, c. AD 410

The original seat of Roman imperial power soon became a center of church authority, grew in power decade by decade, and was recognized during the period of the Seven Ecumenical Councils, when the seat of government had been transferred to Constantinople, as the "head" of the church.

Rome and Alexandria, which by tradition held authority over sees outside their own province, were not yet referred to as patriarchates.

The earliest Bishops of Rome were all Greek-speaking, the most notable of them being: Pope Clement I (c. 88–97), author of an Epistle to the Church in Corinth; Pope Telesphorus (c. 126–136), probably the only martyr among them; Pope Pius I (c. 141–154), said by the Muratorian fragment to have been the brother of the author of the Shepherd of Hermas; and Pope Anicetus (c. 155–160), who received Saint Polycarp and discussed with him the dating of Easter.

Pope Victor I (189–198) was the first ecclesiastical writer known to have written in Latin; however, his only extant works are his encyclicals, which would naturally have been issued in Latin and Greek.

Greek New Testament texts were translated into Latin early on, well before Jerome, and are classified as the Vetus Latina and Western text-type.

During the 2nd century, Christians and semi-Christians of diverse views congregated in Rome, notably Marcion and Valentinius, and in the following century there were schisms connected with Hippolytus of Rome and Novatian.

The Roman church survived various persecutions. Among the prominent Christians executed as a result of their refusal to perform acts of worship to the Roman gods as ordered by emperor Valerian in 258 were Cyprian, bishop of Carthage. The last and most severe of the imperial persecutions was that under Diocletian in 303; they ended in Rome, and the West in general, with the accession of Maxentius in 306.

==== Carthage ====
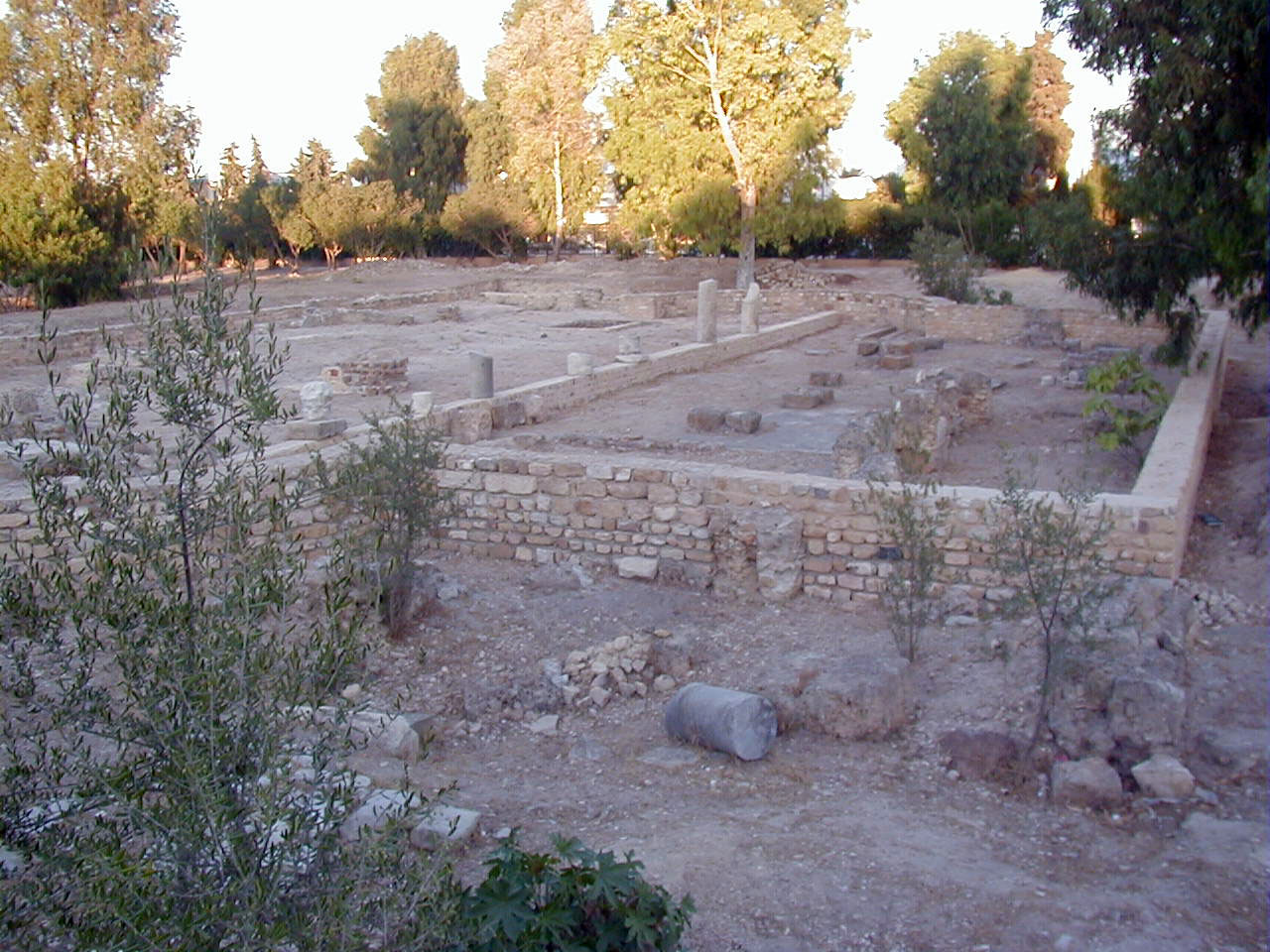
Early Christian quarter in ancient Carthage

Carthage, in the Roman province of Africa, south of the Mediterranean from Rome, gave the early church the Latin fathers Tertullian (c. 120 – c. 220) and Cyprian (d. 258). Carthage fell to Islam in 698 AD.

The Church of Carthage thus was to the Early African church what the Church of Rome was to the Catholic Church in Italy. The archdiocese used the African Rite, a variant of the Western liturgical rites in Latin language, possibly a local use of the primitive Roman Rite. Famous figures include Saint Perpetua, Saint Felicitas, and their Companions (died c. 203), Tertullian (c. 155–240), Cyprian (c. 200–258), Caecilianus (floruit 311), Saint Aurelius (died 429), and Eugenius of Carthage (died 505). Tertullian and Cyprian are considered Latin Church Fathers of the Latin Church. Tertullian, a theologian of part Berber descent, was instrumental in the development of trinitarian theology, and was the first to apply Latin language extensively in his theological writings. As such, Tertullian has been called "the father of Latin Christianity" and "the founder of Western theology". Carthage remained an important center of Christianity until 698, hosting several councils.

==== Southern Gaul ====
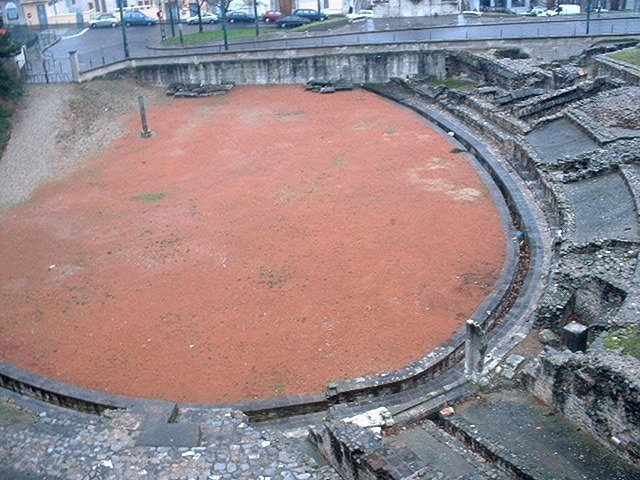
Amphithéâtre des Trois-Gaules in Lyon. The pole in the arena is a memorial to the people killed during the persecution.

The Mediterranean coast of France and the Rhone valley, then part of Roman Gallia Narbonensis, were early centers of Christianity. Major Christian communities were found in Arles, Avignon, Vienne, Lyon, and Marseille (the oldest city in France). The Persecution in Lyon occurred in 177. The Apostolic Father Irenaeus from Smyrna of Anatolia was Bishop of Lyon near the end of the 2nd century and he claimed Saint Pothinus was his predecessor. The Council of Arles in 314 is considered a forerunner of the ecumenical councils. The Ephesine theory attributes the Gallican Rite to Lyon.

==== Aquileia ====
The ancient Roman city of Aquileia at the head of the Adriatic Sea, today one of the main archaeological sites of Northern Italy, was an early center of Christianity said to be founded by Mark before his mission to Alexandria. Hermagoras of Aquileia is believed to be its first bishop. The Aquileian Rite is associated with Aquileia.

==== Milan ====
It is believed that the Church of Milan in northwest Italy was founded by the apostle Barnabas in the 1st century. Gervasius and Protasius and others were martyred there. It has long maintained its own rite known as the Ambrosian Rite attributed to Ambrose (born c. 330) who was bishop in 374–397 and one of the most influential ecclesiastical figures of the 4th century. Duchesne argues that the Gallican Rite originated in Milan.

==== Syracuse and Calabria ====
Syracuse was founded by Greek colonists in 734 or 733 BC, part of Magna Graecia. Syracuse is one of the first Christian communities established by Peter, preceded only by Antioch. Paul also preached in Syracuse. Historical evidence from the middle of the third century, during the time of Cyprian, suggests that Christianity was thriving in Syracuse, and the presence of catacombs provides clear indications of Christian activity in the second century as well. Across the Strait of Messina, Calabria on the mainland was also probably an early center of Christianity.

==== Malta ====
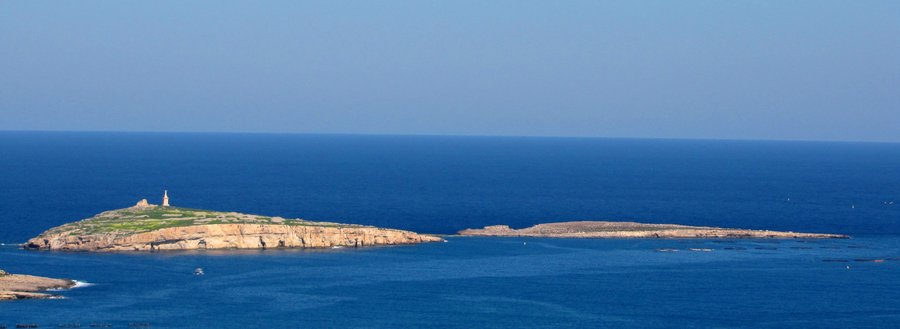
St Paul's Islands near St. Paul's Bay, traditionally identified as the place where St Paul was shipwrecked

According to Acts, Paul was shipwrecked and ministered on an island which some scholars have identified as Malta (an island just south of Sicily) for three months during which time he is said to have been bitten by a poisonous viper and survived (Acts 27:39–42; Acts 28:1–11), an event usually dated c. AD 60. Paul had been allowed passage from Caesarea Maritima to Rome by Porcius Festus, procurator of Iudaea Province, to stand trial before the Emperor. Many traditions are associated with this episode, and catacombs in Rabat testify to an Early Christian community on the islands. According to tradition, Publius, the Roman Governor of Malta at the time of Saint Paul's shipwreck, became the first Bishop of Malta following his conversion to Christianity. After ruling the Maltese Church for thirty-one years, Publius was transferred to the See of Athens in AD 90, where he was martyred in AD 125. There is scant information about the continuity of Christianity in Malta in subsequent years, although tradition has it that there was a continuous line of bishops from the days of St. Paul to the time of Emperor Constantine.

==== Salona ====
Salona, the capital of the Roman province of Dalmatia on the eastern shore of the Adriatic Sea, was an early center of Christianity and today is a ruin in modern Croatia. Titus, a disciple of Paul, preached there. Some Christians suffered martyrdom.

Salona emerged as a center for the spread of Christianity, with Andronicus establishing the See of Syrmium (Mitrovica) in Pannonia, followed by those in Siscia and Mursia. The Diocletianic Persecution left deep marks in Dalmatia and Pannonia. Quirinus, bishop of Siscia, died a martyr in AD 303.

==== Seville ====
Seville was the capital of Hispania Baetica or the Roman province of southern Spain. The origin of the diocese of Seville can be traced back to Apostolic times, or at least to the first century AD. Gerontius, the bishop of Italica, near Hispalis (Seville), likely appointed a pastor for Seville. A bishop of Seville named Sabinus participated in the Council of Illiberis in 287. He was the bishop when Justa and Rufina were martyred in 303 for refusing to worship the idol Salambo. Prior to Sabinus, Marcellus is listed as a bishop of Seville in an ancient catalogue of prelates preserved in the "Codex Emilianensis". After the Edict of Milan in 313, Evodius became the bishop of Seville and undertook the task of rebuilding the churches that had been damaged. It is believed that he may have constructed the church of San Vicente, which could have been the first cathedral of Seville. Early Christianity also spread from the Iberian Peninsula south across the Strait of Gibraltar into Roman Mauretania Tingitana, of note is Marcellus of Tangier who was martyred in 298.

==== Roman Britain ====
Christianity reached Roman Britain by the third century of the Christian era, the first recorded martyrs in Britain being St. Alban of Verulamium and Julius and Aaron of Caerleon, during the reign of Diocletian (284–305). Gildas dated the faith's arrival to the latter part of the reign of Tiberius, although stories connecting it with Joseph of Arimathea, Lucius, or Fagan are now generally considered pious forgeries. Restitutus, Bishop of London, is recorded as attending the 314 Council of Arles, along with the Bishop of Lincoln and Bishop of York.

Christianisation intensified and evolved into Celtic Christianity after the Romans left Britain c. 410.

=== Outside the Roman Empire ===
Christianity also spread beyond the Roman Empire during the early Christian period.

==== Armenia ====
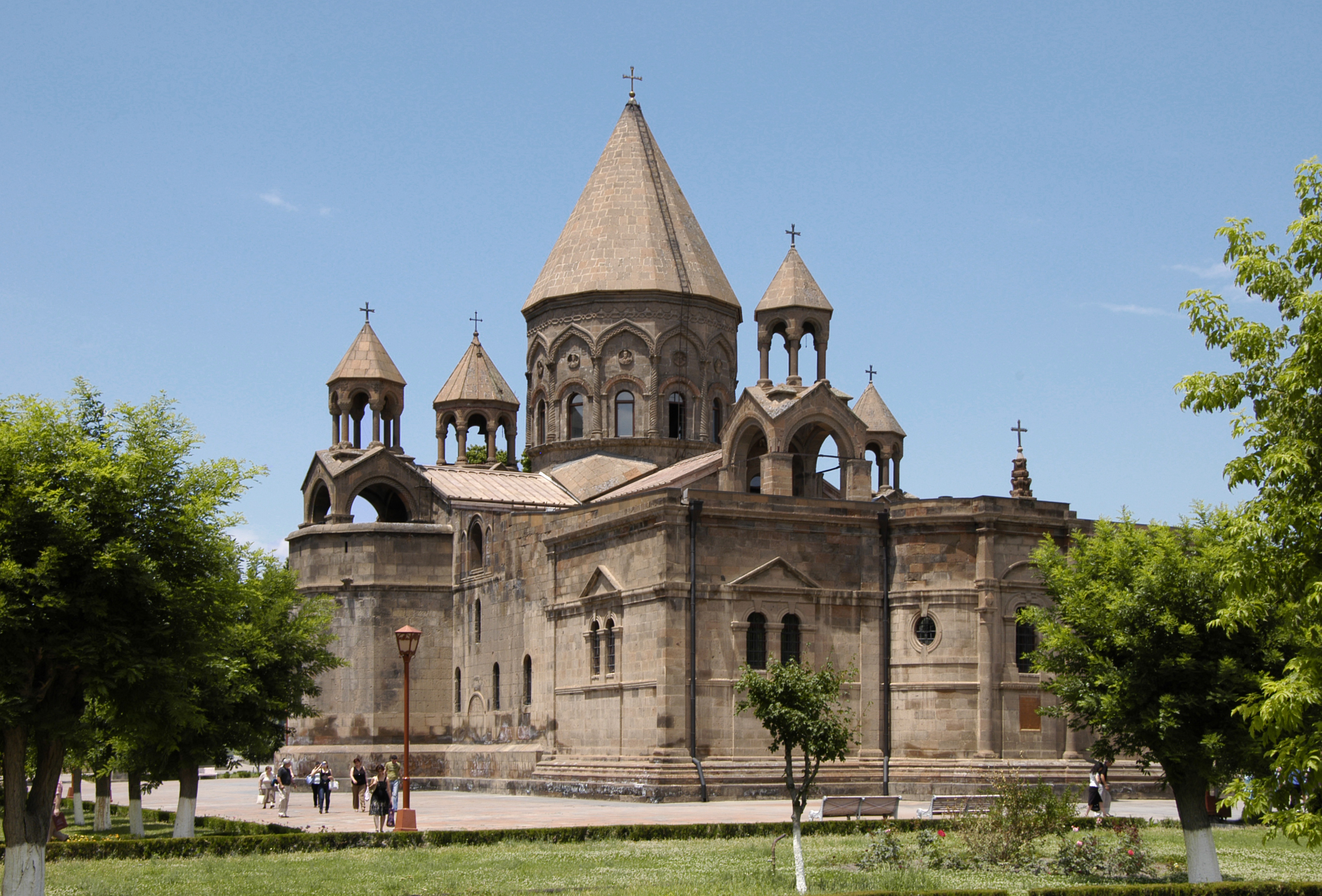
Etchmiadzin Cathedral, regarded the oldest cathedral in the world

It is accepted that the Kingdom of Armenia became the first polity to adopt Christianity as its state religion. Although it has long been claimed that Armenia was the first Christian kingdom, according to some scholars this has relied on a source by Agathangelos titled "The History of the Armenians", which has recently been redated, casting some doubt.

Christianity became the official religion of the Kingdom of Armenia in 301, when it was still illegal in the Roman Empire. According to church tradition, the Armenian Apostolic Church was founded by Gregory the Illuminator of the late third to early fourth centuries after the conversion of Tiridates III. The church traces its origins to the missions of Bartholomew the Apostle and Thaddeus (Jude the Apostle) in the 1st century.

Tiridates III was the first Christian king in Armenia from 298 to 330.

==== Georgia ====
According to Orthodox tradition, Christianity was first preached in Georgia by the Apostles Simon and Andrew in the 1st century. It became the state religion of Kartli (Iberia) in 319. The conversion of Kartli to Christianity is credited to a Greek lady called St. Nino of Cappadocia. The Georgian Orthodox Church, originally part of the Church of Antioch, gained its autocephaly and developed its doctrinal specificity progressively between the 5th and 10th centuries. The Bible was also translated into Georgian in the 5th century, as the Georgian alphabet was developed for that purpose.

==== India ====
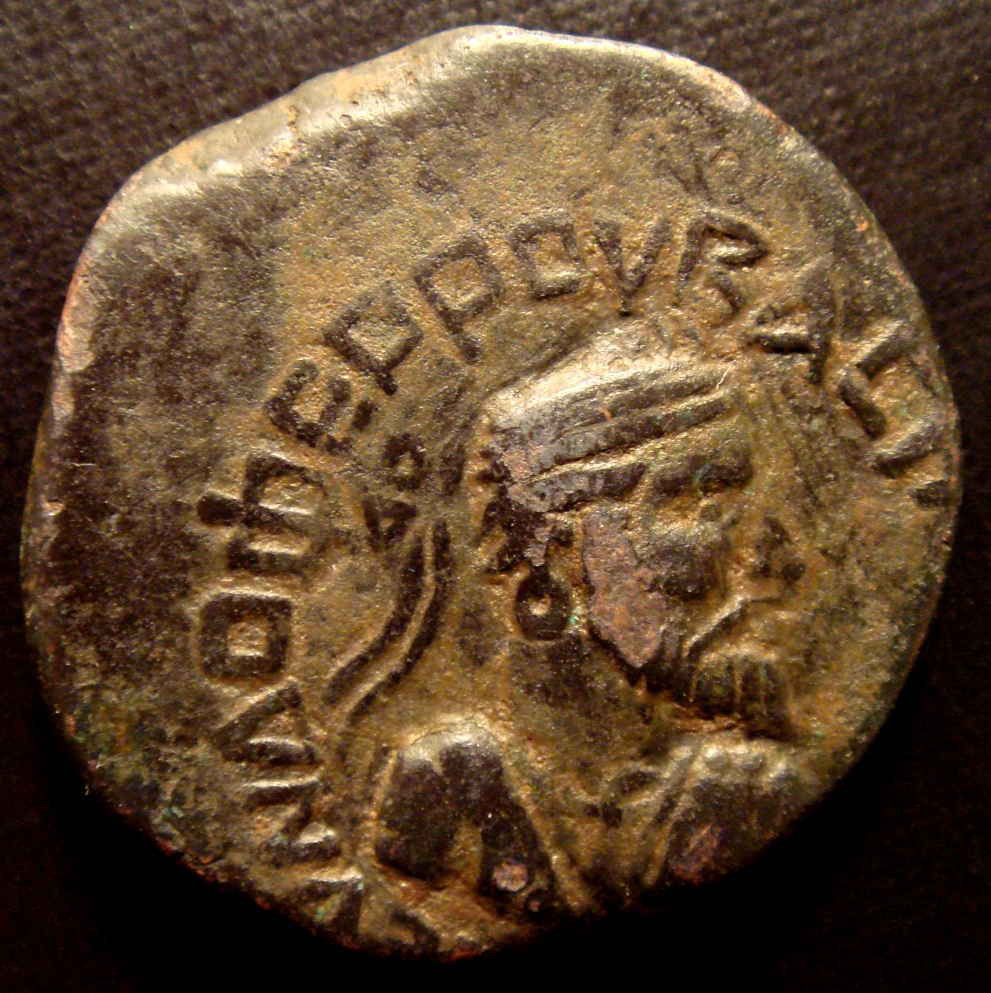
According to tradition, the Indo-Parthian king Gondophares was proselytized by St Thomas, who continued on to southern India, and possibly as far as Malaysia or China.

According to Eusebius' record, the apostles Thomas and Bartholomew were assigned to Parthia (modern Iran) and India. By the time of the establishment of the Second Persian Empire (AD 226), there were bishops of the Church of the East in northwest India, Afghanistan and Baluchistan (including parts of Iran, Afghanistan, and Pakistan), with laymen and clergy alike engaging in missionary activity.

An early third-century Syriac work known as the Acts of Thomas connects the apostle's Indian ministry with two kings, one in the north and the other in the south. According to the Acts, Thomas was at first reluctant to accept this mission, but the Lord appeared to him in a night vision and compelled him to accompany an Indian merchant, Abbanes (or Habban), to his native place in northwest India. There, Thomas found himself in the service of the Indo-Parthian King, Gondophares. The Apostle's ministry resulted in many conversions throughout the kingdom, including the king and his brother.

Thomas thereafter went south to Kerala and baptized the natives, whose descendants form the Saint Thomas Christians or the Syrian Malabar Nasranis.

Piecing together the various traditions, the story suggests that Thomas left northwest India when invasion threatened, and traveled by vessel to the Malabar Coast along the southwestern coast of the Indian continent, possibly visiting southeast Arabia and Socotra en route, and landing at the former flourishing port of Muziris on an island near Cochin in 52. From there he preached the gospel throughout the Malabar Coast. The various churches he founded were located mainly on the Periyar River and its tributaries and along the coast. He preached to all classes of people and had about 170 converts, including members of the four principal castes. Later, stone crosses were erected at the places where churches were founded, and they became pilgrimage centres. In accordance with apostolic custom, Thomas ordained teachers and leaders or elders, who were reported to be the earliest ministry of the Malabar church.

Thomas next proceeded overland to the Coromandel Coast in southeastern India, and ministered in what is now Chennai (earlier Madras), where a local king and many people were converted. One tradition related that he went from there to China via Malacca in Malaysia, and after spending some time there, returned to the Chennai area. Apparently his renewed ministry outraged the Brahmins, who were fearful lest Christianity undermine their social caste system. So according to the Syriac version of the Acts of Thomas, Mazdai, the local king at Mylapore, after questioning the Apostle condemned him to death about the year AD 72. Anxious to avoid popular excitement, the King ordered Thomas conducted to a nearby mountain, where, after being allowed to pray, he was then stoned and stabbed to death with a lance wielded by an angry Brahmin.

==== Mesopotamia and the Parthian Empire ====
Edessa, which was held by Rome from 116 to 118 and 212 to 214, but was mostly a client kingdom associated either with Rome or Persia, was an important Christian city. Shortly after 201 or even earlier, its royal house became Christian.

Edessa (now Şanlıurfa) in northwestern Mesopotamia was from apostolic times the principal center of Syriac-speaking Christianity. it was the capital of an independent kingdom from 132 BC to AD 216, when it became tributary to Rome. Celebrated as an important centre of Greco-Syrian culture, Edessa was also noted for its Jewish community, with proselytes in the royal family. Strategically located on the main trade routes of the Fertile Crescent, it was easily accessible from Antioch, where the mission to the Gentiles was inaugurated. When early Christians were scattered abroad because of persecution, some found refuge at Edessa. Thus the Edessan church traced its origin to the Apostolic Age (which may account for its rapid growth), and Christianity even became the state religion for a time.

The Church of the East had its inception at a very early date in the buffer zone between the Parthian and Roman Empires in Upper Mesopotamia, known as the Assyrian Church of the East. The vicissitudes of its later growth were rooted in its minority status in a situation of international tension. The rulers of the Parthian Empire (250 BC – AD 226) were on the whole tolerant in spirit, and with the older faiths of Babylonia and Assyria in a state of decay, the time was ripe for a new and vital faith. The rulers of the Sasanian Empire (224–651) also followed a policy of religious toleration to begin with, though later they gave Christians the same status as a subject race. However, these rulers also encouraged the revival of the ancient Persian dualistic faith of Zoroastrianism and established it as the state religion, with the result that the Christians were increasingly subjected to repressive measures. Nevertheless, it was not until Christianity became the state religion in the West (380) that enmity toward Rome was focused on the Eastern Christians. After the Muslim conquest in the 7th century, the caliphate tolerated other faiths but forbade proselytism and subjected Christians to heavy taxation.

The missionary Addai evangelized Mesopotamia (modern Iraq) about the middle of the 2nd century. An ancient legend recorded by Eusebius (260–340) and also found in the Doctrine of Addai (c. 400) (from information in the royal archives of Edessa) describes how King Abgar V of Edessa communicated to Jesus, requesting he come and heal him, to which appeal he received a reply. It is said that after the resurrection, Thomas sent Addai (or Thaddaeus), to the king, with the result that the city was won to the Christian faith. In this mission he was accompanied by a disciple, Mari, and the two are regarded as co-founders of the church, according to the Liturgy of Addai and Mari (c. 200), which is still the normal liturgy of the Assyrian church. The Doctrine of Addai further states that Thomas was regarded as an apostle of the church in Edessa.

Addai, who became the first bishop of Edessa, was succeeded by Aggai, then by Palut, who was ordained about 200 by Serapion of Antioch. Thence came to us in the 2nd century the famous Peshitta, or Syriac translation of the Old Testament; also Tatian's Diatessaron, which was compiled about 172 and in common use until St. Rabbula, Bishop of Edessa (412–435), forbade its use. This arrangement of the four canonical gospels as a continuous narrative, whose original language may have been Syriac, Greek, or even Latin, circulated widely in Syriac-speaking Churches.

A Christian council was held at Edessa as early as 197. In 201 the city was devastated by a great flood, and the Christian church was destroyed. In 232, the Syriac Acts were written supposedly on the event of the relics of the Apostle Thomas being handed to the church in Edessa. Under Roman domination many martyrs suffered at Edessa: Sts. Scharbîl and Barsamya, under Decius; Sts. Gûrja, Schâmôna, Habib, and others under Diocletian. In the meanwhile Christian priests from Edessa had evangelized Eastern Mesopotamia and Persia, and established the first churches in the kingdom of the Sasanians. Atillâtiâ, Bishop of Edessa, assisted at the First Council of Nicaea (325).

==== Persia and Central Asia ====
By the latter half of the 2nd century, Christianity had spread east throughout Media, Persia, Parthia, and Bactria. The twenty bishops and many presbyters were more of the order of itinerant missionaries, passing from place to place as Paul did and supplying their needs with such occupations as merchant or craftsman. By 280 the metropolis of Seleucia assumed the title of "Catholicos" and in AD 424 a council of the church at Seleucia elected the first patriarch to have jurisdiction over the whole church of the East. The seat of the Patriarchate was fixed at Seleucia-Ctesiphon, since this was an important point on the east–west trade routes which extended to India and China, Java and Japan. Thus the shift of ecclesiastical authority was away from Edessa, which in AD 216 had become tributary to Rome. the establishment of an independent patriarchate with nine subordinate metropoli contributed to a more favourable attitude by the Persian government, which no longer had to fear an ecclesiastical alliance with the common enemy, Rome.

By the time that Edessa was incorporated into the Persian Empire in 258, the city of Arbela, situated on the Tigris in what is now Iraq, had taken on more and more the role that Edessa had played in the early years, as a centre from which Christianity spread to the rest of the Persian Empire.

Bardaisan, writing about 196, speaks of Christians throughout Media, Parthia and Bactria (modern-day Afghanistan) and, according to Tertullian (c. 160–230), there were already a number of bishoprics within the Persian Empire by 220. By 315, the bishop of Seleucia–Ctesiphon had assumed the title "Catholicos". By this time, neither Edessa nor Arbela was the centre of the Church of the East anymore; ecclesiastical authority had moved east to the heart of the Persian Empire. The twin cities of Seleucia-Ctesiphon, well-situated on the main trade routes between East and West, became, in the words of John Stewart, "a magnificent centre for the missionary church that was entering on its great task of carrying the gospel to the far east".

Shahanshah Shapur II of the Sasanian Empire was not initially hostile to his Christian subjects, who were led by Shemon Bar Sabbae, the Patriarch of the Church of the East; however, the conversion of Constantine the Great to Christianity caused Shapur to start distrusting his Christian subjects. He started seeing them as agents of a foreign enemy. The wars between the Sasanian and Roman empires turned Shapur's mistrust into hostility. After the death of Constantine, Shapur II, who had been preparing for a war against the Romans for several years, imposed a double tax on his Christian subjects to finance the conflict. Shemon, however, refused to pay the double tax. Shapur started pressuring Shemon and his clergy to convert to Zoroastrianism, which they refused to do. It was during this period the "cycle of the martyrs" began during which "many thousands of Christians" were put to death. During the following years, Shemon's successors, Shahdost and Barba'shmin, were also martyred.

A near-contemporary 5th-century Christian work, the Ecclesiastical History of Sozomen, contains considerable detail on the Persian Christians martyred under Shapur II. Sozomen estimates the total number of Christians killed as follows:

The number of men and women whose names have been ascertained, and who were martyred at this period, has been computed to be upwards of sixteen thousand, while the multitude of martyrs whose names are unknown was so great that the Persians, the Syrians, and the inhabitants of Edessa, have failed in all their efforts to compute the number.

— Sozomen, in his Ecclesiastical History, Book II, Chapter XIV

==== Arabian Peninsula ====
To understand the penetration of the Arabian Peninsula by the Christian gospel, it is helpful to distinguish between the Bedouin nomads of the interior, who were chiefly herdsmen and unreceptive to foreign control, and the inhabitants of the settled communities of the coastal areas and oases, who were either middlemen traders or farmers and were receptive to influences from abroad. Christianity apparently gained its strongest foothold in the ancient center of Semitic civilization in South-west Arabia or Yemen (sometimes known as Seba or Sheba, whose queen visited Solomon). Because of geographic proximity, acculturation with Ethiopia was always strong, and the royal family traces its ancestry to this queen.

The presence of Arabians at Pentecost and Paul's three-year sojourn in Arabia suggest a very early gospel witness. A 4th-century church history, states that the apostle Bartholomew preached in Arabia and that Himyarites were among his converts. The Al-Jubail Church in what is now Saudi Arabia was built in the 4th century. Arabia's close relations with Ethiopia give significance to the conversion of the treasurer to the queen of Ethiopia, not to mention the tradition that the Apostle Matthew was assigned to this land. Eusebius says that "one Pantaneous (c. 190) was sent from Alexandria as a missionary to the nations of the East", including southwest Arabia, on his way to India.

==== Nubia ====
Christianity arrived early in Nubia. In the New Testament of the Christian Bible, a treasury official of "Candace, queen of the Ethiopians" returning from a trip to Jerusalem was baptised by Philip the Evangelist:

Then the Angel of the Lord said to Philip, Start out and go south to the road that leads down from Jerusalem to Gaza, which is desert. And he arose and went: And behold, a man of Ethiopia, an Eunuch of great authority under Candace, Queen of E-thi-o'pi-ans, who had the charge of all her treasure, and had come to Jerusalem to worship.

Ethiopia at that time meant any upper Nile region. Candace was the title and perhaps, name for the Meroë or Kushite queens.

In the fourth century, bishop Athanasius of Alexandria consecrated Marcus as bishop of Philae before his death in 373, showing that Christianity had permanently penetrated the region. John of Ephesus records that a Monophysite priest named Julian converted the king and his nobles of Nobatia around 545 and another kingdom of Alodia converted around 569. By the 7th century Makuria had expanded to become the dominant power in the region, strong enough to halt the southern expansion of Islam after the Arabs had taken Egypt. After several failed invasions the new rulers agreed to a treaty with Dongola allowing for peaceful coexistence and trade. This treaty held for six hundred years allowing Arab traders introducing Islam to Nubia and it gradually supplanted Christianity. The last recorded bishop was Timothy at Qasr Ibrim in 1372.

== See also ==
- Baptism in early Christianity
- Christianity in the ante-Nicene period
- Christianity in the 4th century
- Diversity in early Christian theology
- Early Christian art and architecture
- History of Christianity
- Proto-orthodox Christianity
- Split of Christianity and Judaism
- Historiography of early Christianity

== Bibliography ==
- Bond, Helen K. (2012). The Historical Jesus: A Guide for the Perplexed. Bloomsbury Academic. ISBN 978-0-567-12510-1.
- Chadwick, Henry (1993). The Early Church. The Penguin History of the Church. Vol. 1 (revised ed.). Penguin Books. ISBN 978-0-14-023199-1.
- Dunn, James D.G. Jews and Christians: The Parting of the Ways, AD 70 to 135. pp 33–34. Wm. B. Eerdmans Publishing (1999). ISBN 978-0-8028-4498-9.
- Fredriksen, Paula (1999). Jesus of Nazareth, King of the Jews: A Jewish Life and the Emergence of Christianity. Vintage Books. ISBN 978-0-679-76746-6.
- Freeman, Charles (2011). A New History of Early Christianity. Yale University Press. ISBN 978-0-300-17083-2.
- González, Justo L. (1987). A History of Christian Thought. Vol. 1: From the Beginnings to the Council of Chalcedon (revised ed.). Abingdon Press. ISBN 978-0-687-17182-8.
- González, Justo L. (2010). The Story of Christianity. Vol. 1 The Early Church to the Dawn of the Reformation (revised and updated ed.). HarperCollins. ISBN 978-0-06-185588-7.
- Hopkins, Keith (1998). "Christian Number and Its Implications". Journal of Early Christian Studies. 6 (2). Johns Hopkins University Press: 185–226. doi:10.1353/earl.1998.0035. ISSN 1086-3184. S2CID 170769034. Project MUSE 9960.
- Klutz, Todd (2000). "Paul and the Development of Gentile Christianity". In Esler, Philip F. (ed.). The Early Christian World. Routledge Worlds. Routledge. pp. 178–190. ISBN 978-1-032-19934-4.
- Bruce W. Longenecker; David E. Wilhite, eds. (2024). The Cambridge History of Ancient Christianity. Cambridge University Press. doi:10.1017/9781108620420. ISBN 978-1-108-42739-5.
- MacCulloch, Diarmaid (2010). Christianity: The First Three Thousand Years. Penguin Books. ISBN 978-1-101-18999-3.
- Marcus, Joel (2006). "Jewish Christianity". In Mitchell, Margaret M.; Young, Frances M. (eds.). The Cambridge History of Christianity. Vol. 1: Origins to Constantine. Cambridge University Press. pp. 87–102. doi:10.1017/CHOL9780521812399. ISBN 978-1-139-05483-6.
- McGrath, Alister (2013). Christian History: An Introduction. Wiley-Blackwell. ISBN 978-1-118-33780-6.
- Mitchell, Margaret M. (2006). "Gentile Christianity". In Mitchell, Margaret M.; Young, Frances M. (eds.). The Cambridge History of Christianity. Vol. 1: Origins to Constantine. Cambridge University Press. pp. 103–124. doi:10.1017/CHOL9780521812399. ISBN 978-1-139-05483-6.
- Schnelle, Udo (2020). The First One Hundred Years of Christianity: An Introduction to Its History, Literature, and Development. Translated by Thompson, James W. Grand Rapids, Michigan: Baker Academic. ISBN 978-1-4934-2242-5.
- Seifrid, Mark A. (1992). Justification by Faith: The Origin and Development of a Central Pauline Theme. Novum Testamentum, Supplements. Leiden: Brill Publishers. ISBN 978-90-04-09521-2. ISSN 0167-9732.
- Vidmar, John (2005). The Catholic Church Through the Ages: A History (Illustrated, annotated ed.). Paulist Press. ISBN 978-0-8091-4234-7.
- Wilken, Robert Louis (2012). The First Thousand Years: A Global History of Christianity. Yale University Press. ISBN 978-0-300-11884-1.
