= Acts of Pusai =

The Acts of Pusai or Martyrdom of Pusai is a Syriac narrative about the martyrdom of a Persian Christian saint named Pusai. It is one of the Persian martyr acts.

English-speaking literature refers to this work by a variety of names, including the Martyrdom of Pusai-Qarugbed, on account of Pusai's title Qarugbed, "Head of the Craftsmen", and as the "Martyrdom of Pusay (or Phusik, Pusayk, Pusices, Pusik", Posi). Other variants include Acts of Mar Pusai and the Passions of Pusay.

== Narrative overview ==
The Sassanian Persian kings Shapur I (ruled 239-270 CE) and Shapur II (ruled 309-379) both struggled against the Roman Empire and deported prisoners of war to other areas within their own empire. The Acts of Pusai seems to have mixed these two rulers into a single "Shapur" in producing the narrative about Pusai, who is said to have descended from Roman captives of Shapur.

According to the Acts, Pusai married a Persian woman, converted her to Christianity, and baptised their children. Pusai and his family were relocated by Shapur to the new settlement of Karka d'Ledan, near Susa. The intention of Shapur was to bring deportees from a variety of regions to the new city so that they would intermarry and therefore lose interest in returning to their homelands. The narrator records that while Shapur did this for self-interested reasons, God used this intermingling to spread Christianity. There Pusai worked as a skilled craftsman in the making of fine cloth. The king took notice of his skills, and promoted him and regularly gave him gifts.

Pusai was martyred in the year 341. Shapur began persecuting Christians, and when Pusai witnessed the martyrdom of one Christian, Pusai encouraged the man, soon to be killed, to close his eyes and think of Christ. Pusai was immediately reported to Shapur, who had him arrested. He was interrogated by Shapur, and argued against Shapur's Zurvanite religious ideas. Instead of renouncing his faith, Pusai announced that he was willing to die for it, and was killed by having his tongue torn from his mouth. His daughter Martha, who had taken a lifetime religious vow of celibacy, was taken into custody and put to death a little later.
