= Martyrdom of Simeon =

Christian martyr under the Sasanian Empire

The Martyrdom of Simeon is an account of Syriac literature concerning the martyrdom (religious killing) of Shemon (or Simeon) Bar Sabbae, a leader in the Church of the East in the Sasanian Empire. Shemon was killed by the Zoroastrian Sasanian authorities for refusing to collect taxes from Christians in the empire to be used in fighting against the Roman Empire. For Shemon, the poverty of the Christian Sasanian community made it impossible for him to act on these changes, which would have doubled their level of taxation.

The Martyrdom is one of the Persian martyr acts, and in particular, belongs to a group of four martyrdom acts called the The Martyrdom of Mar Simeon, the Archbishop of the Church of the East. It is not to be confused with the History of Simeon, another narrative about the same individual. There are conflicting chronological notes in the relevant ancient sources, but the death of Simeon must be placed in the neighborhood of 344 CE. (Note: Another date sometimes encountered is 340 CE.)

An account of the martyrdom of Simeon was later included in Foxe's influential Book of Martyrs.
