= Pusai =

Christian priest and martyr (d. 344)

Pusai (?-Good Friday, 344) was a Christian priest and companion in martyrdom with Simeon Barsabae and others. They are collectively commemorated in feasts on April 17 in the Greek Orthodox Church, April 21 in the Roman Catholic Church, April 30 in the Melkite Catholic Church, and the Friday after Easter in the Syriac Orthodox Church and the Assyrian Church of the East.

The martyrdom of Pusai is recorded in a work called the Acts of Pusai, one of many works of Persian martyr acts.
