= Barba'shmin =

Barbaʿshmin, also called Barbasceminus, was a fourth-century bishop of Seleucia-Ctesiphon, primate of the Church of the East, and martyr. He succeeded Shahdost as bishop of Seleucia-Ctesiphon in 343, during the great persecution of Shapur II, and was martyred three years later, in 346. Like several other early bishops of Seleucia-Ctesiphon, he is included in the traditional list of patriarchs of the Church of the East, which also considers him a saint. His feast day is January 14.

== Sources ==
Brief accounts of Barbaʿshmin's episcopate are given in the Ecclesiastical Chronicle of the Jacobite writer Bar Hebraeus (floruit 1280) and in the ecclesiastical histories of the Nestorian writers Mari (twelfth-century), ʿAmr (fourteenth-century) and Sliba (fourteenth-century). His life is also covered in the Chronicle of Seert. In all these accounts he is anachronistically called 'catholicus', a term that was only applied to the primates of the Church of the East in the fifth century.

== Barbaʿshmin's episcopate ==
The following account of Barbaʿshmin's episcopate and martyrdom is given by Mari:

The patriarch Barbaʿshmin, whose name means 'the man with four names', was the sister's son of Shemʿon Bar Sabbaʿe and a native of Beth Garmai. He was a man of outstanding piety and honesty. He was consecrated in secret in the house of a believer, on account of Shapur’s persecution of the Christians, and he secretly consecrated bishops over the various districts. Shapur concentrated his attacks on the priests, thinking that if he wiped them out, the other Christians would then convert to the teachings of the magi. In those days calamities multiplied, and the Christians lay in hiding for a long time; and when they finally emerged, calling on the name of Christ, he first killed 100,000 of them, and then a further 30,000. Mar Miles died a martyr, and with him many other bishops. Shapur then arrested the patriarch Barbaʿshmin along with many of his priests and deacons, and told him that he had no right to govern without his permission. Then he clapped him in irons and threw him into prison along with thirty of his priests, and tortured them with cruel torments, and deprived them of food and water for eleven months, until they all turned black from their prolonged sufferings. Then he summoned him, and offered him a governorship and riches if he became a magus. But that holy man laughed at him, and said, 'The more Christians you kill, the more their numbers will increase.' For that remark he was killed on the same spot where Shemʿon Bar Sabbaʿe had been killed, and thirty-three other men suffered with him. Then the magi began to say, 'Killing these people indeed only increases their number!' The bishop of al-Ahwaz [Hormizd Ardashir] buried Barbaʿshmin and his companions near Jundishapur.

A slightly different account, with further details, is given by Bar Hebraeus:

After Shahdost, Barbaʿshmin. This is a Chaldean name and signifies 'the man with four names'. He was from Beth Garmai, and was also the sister's son of Shemʿon Bar Sabbaʿe. He was elected secretly at Seleucia and consecrated in the house of a believer. He urged the clerics, religious and bishops to change their clothes and to wear secular garments, in order to evade the persecution of the impious Shapur. Much later, after the persecution came to an end and Nestorianism spread in the East, those who changed their clothes also changed their faith. They declined to resume that holy dress of yore, principally because they were cut off from the other Christian peoples, where monks demonstrated their humility by wearing the Antonian garb. After Barbaʿshmin had secretly fulfilled his office for seven years, Shapur got wind of him and arrested him along with sixteen men, priests and believers. They were all thrown into prison, and for eleven months he tried to win them over to the faith of the magi, offering them many inducements. But when they refused to deny their faith, he killed them in Karka d’Ledan in Beth Huzaye, on the ninth day of November. The bishops did not attempt to choose another leader, because all of their predecessors had been killed.

The Church of the East remained without a leader for several years after Barbaʿshmin's death.

== See also ==
- List of patriarchs of the Church of the East
- Martyrs of Persia under Shapur II

== Notes ==
Church of the East titles
Preceded by Shahdost (341–343)	Catholicos-Patriarch of the Church of the East; Bishop of Seleucia-Ctesiphon (343–346)	Succeeded by Vacant (c.346–363); Tomarsa (363–371)
