= Acts of Adur-Hormizd, Pethion and Anahid =

Syriac martyrology

The Acts of Ādur-Hormizd, Pethiōn and Anāhīd is a work of Christian Syriac literature in the genre of martyrology concerning the hermit Pethiōn and two aristocratic converts from Zoroastrianism, named Ādur-Hormizd and his daughter Anāhīd. The events of the narrative are set in 446, during the reign of the Sasanian king Yazdegerd II, and the texts appear to have been written not long afterward.

The cycle belongs to the literature of Persian martyr acts. Unlike many Syriac martyr acts, which are mainly concerned with attacking the Persian veneration or worship of the celestial bodies and elements, such as the sun, fire, and water, the Acts of Adur-Hormizd also preserve a considerable amount of informration about Zoroastrian and Zurvanite terminology and beliefs, albeit in some cases polemical and corrupted.

The Acts was translated into English in 1997. In Syriac historiography, it is also called AMS 2.559–631, referring to its location in the publication, the Analecta Bollandiana.

== Narrative ==
The story begins with a Magian named Mihryar who lived in Balashfarr (Balashfar), a province of the Sasanian Empire. His son Yazdin is educated by a Christian tutor named Jacob. Due to his relationship with Jacob, he ends up converting to Christianity, and goes on to also convert his brother Dadgushnasp to the religion (who is then christened Dadišoʿ). Yazdin takes on Pethion, a child of his brother, as his pupil, and together they live an ascetic lifestyle for fourteen years. In this time, they gain a reputation for miraculous healing.

The mobad (Zoroastrian priest) Adur-Hormizd seeks out the help of Pethion when he learns that his daughter, Anahid, is afflicted by an evil spirit. Pethion's prayers lead to her healing, which leads to her converting to Christianity. Despite being angered at first by her conversion, he too ends up converting after receiving a vision and after Pethion's prayers also lead to him being healed. Adur-Hormizd is eventually martyred for his Christian faith; after recounting this story, the Acts returns to the story of Anahid.

Anahid, after her father's death, lives near the shrine of Adur-Hormizd and the monastic cell of Pethion. Local Zoroastrian Persian authorities seek her out because of her aristocratic background, her wealth, and her conversion to Christianity. They arrest and interrogate her, urging her to de-convert, and return to her familial religion of Zoroastrianism. She not only refuses, but argues back against Zoroastrian doctrines, ultimately leading to her demise: the authorities torture and then execute her. According to the Acts, her martyrdom took place on 18 June, in the ninth year of Yazdegerd II.

== Anti-Zoroastrian polemic ==
A prominent polemical theme in the Acts is the criticism of Zoroastrian close-kin marriage, or xwēdōdah. As Anahid is interorgated, the Syriac author has her attack Zoroastrian cosmogony by asking whether Ohrmazd, the high god of Zoroastrianism, produced his offspring by himself, "like his father Zurwān", or through relations with his mother, daughter, and sister. The passage belongs to a wider body of Christian, Armenian, and Syriac polemic from the Sasanian period in which close-kin marriage was associated with Zoroastrian mythology and ritual practice. Comparable traditions appear in Eznik of Kolb's Armenian treatise On God and in the Syriac legal and polemical writings attributed to Mar Aba I, while native Zoroastrian sources such as the Pahlavi Rivayat and the Denkard also connect xwēdōdah with creation, cosmic order, and light. For this reason, scholars have treated the Acts as hostile and stylized Christian evidence, but also as evidence that Syriac authors were engaging recognizable Zoroastrian traditions rather than inventing the theme outright.

== Religious and historical significance ==
The Acts reflect a later stage in Sasanian Christian martyrdom literature. Brock and Harvey contrast the mid-fourth-century persecutions under Shapur II with the mid-fifth-century setting of this cycle, when Christianity had become a recognized minority religion in the Sasanian Empire. In this later phase, the greatest danger was faced especially by converts from high-status Zoroastrian or Magian families, rather than by Christians as a whole.

The texts are also important for the study of Zoroastrianism and Zurvanism. The Acts of Ādur-Hormizd mention terms connected with the Avesta, the opposition between the material world and paradise, Ahriman, ritual propitiation, kin-marriage (xwedodah), and Zurwān as a fourfold deity. The Acts contain a polemical passage in which Ohrmazd, the highest god in Zoroastrianism, is described as androgynous "like his father Zurwan".

== Textual tradition ==
A critical edition of the Syriac text was published by Paul Bedjan in Acta martyrum et sanctorum, volume 2, relying on two nineteenth-century East Syriac manuscripts, although only one of the two survives today. Translations based on the edition of Bedjan have been produced by Sebastian Brock and Susan Harvey. Another manuscript (British Library Add. 12174, dated 1197) preserves a West Syriac Life of Pethiōn, but it does not contain the Anahid section.

Fragments of a Sogdian translation of the Pethion cycle, including Anahid, are also known. These fragments show that the story circulated beyond Syriac-speaking Christian communities into the wider Iranian and Central Asian Christian world.
