= Monastery of Saint Athanasius =

Orthodox Christian monastery in Bulgaria

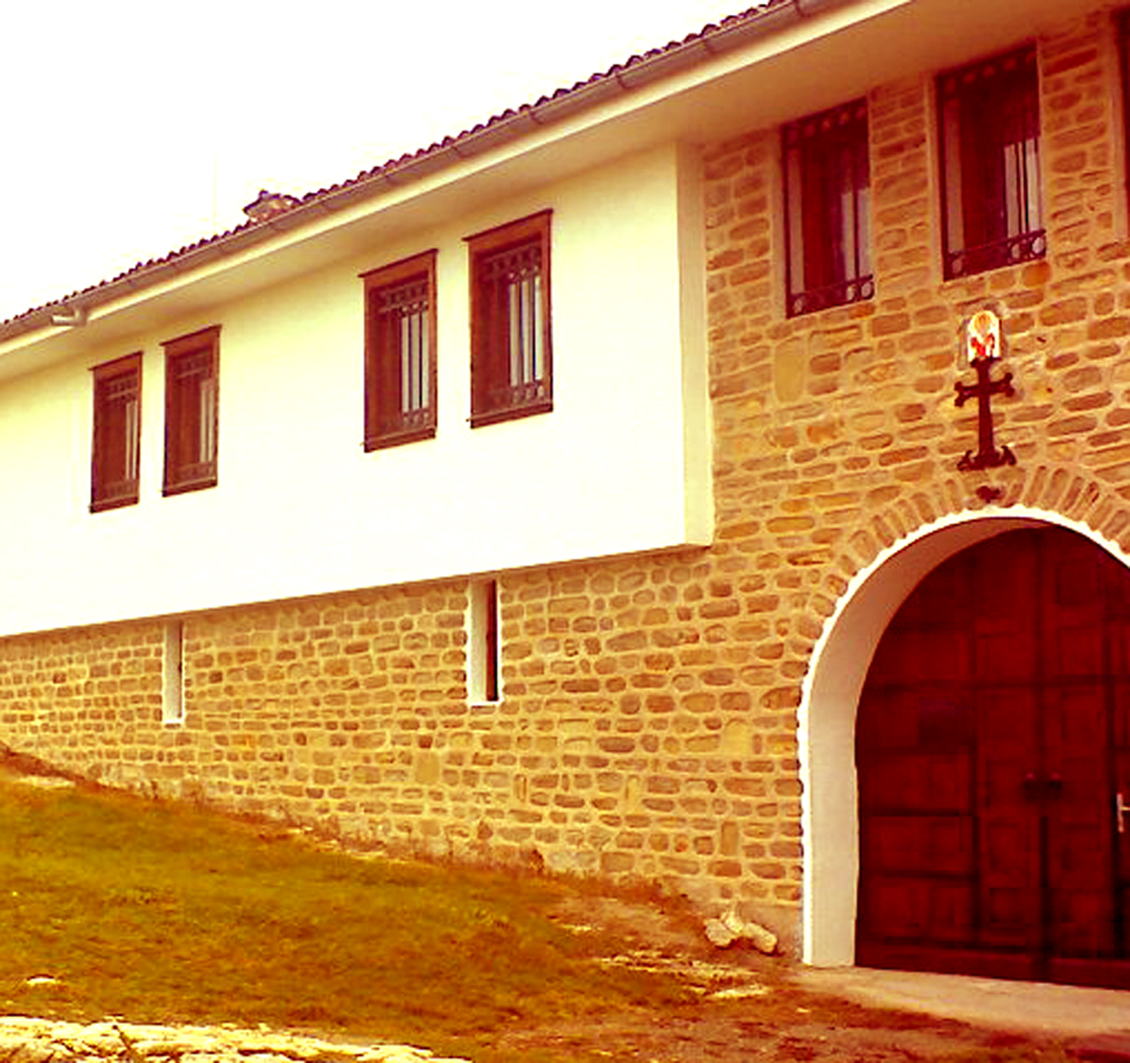
The Monastery of Saint Athanasius

The Monastery of Saint Athanasius (Bulgarian: манастир „Свети Атанасий“) is a Bulgarian Orthodox monastery located close to the village of Zlatna Livada in Chirpan municipality, Stara Zagora Province. The patron saint's day of the church is 2 May, when several thousand people gather.

According to Bulgarian archaeological and historical research from 2004, it is the oldest active monastery in Europe. An expedition led by doctor and academician Rosen Milev was carried out on 18 January 2004, affirming that the monastery was founded by Athanasius of Alexandria in 344 while returning from the Council of Serdica in present-day Sofia. On the way back he stopped and slept in a Roman fortress, the remains of which are located close to today's monastery, deciding to found a monastery due to the strong influence of the Arians (see Ulfilas), whom he considered heretical, on the Goths living in the region of Beroe (modern Stara Zagora). After his death in 373, the monastery was named after him. This is regarded to be proven by the passional of Saint Athanasius and the annals of the Patriarchate of Alexandria, as well as further research in the Vatican Secret Archives.

“According to the saint’s passional while he was traveling to a church council in Serdica in 344, he stopped over at a Roman fortress near the town of Beroe (what is today Stara Zagora). At the time the Arian heresy was spreading quickly in these parts. Being an ardent proponent of Orthodoxy, St. Athanasius decided it was a good place to put up a monastery. He remained here to fast and pray. To this day the hermitage where he lived and prayed is there to be seen. Written evidence of the monastery’s existence has come down to us from the 12th century in the annals by Byzantine princess Anna Comnena. She writes that in a place between Stara Zagora and Plovdiv a monastery was founded, St. Athanasius.” says Nancy Marinova, curator of the Museum of History in Chirpan

The existence of the monastery during the Middle Ages is evidenced by archaeological material. It was also visited by Bulgarian revolutionary Vasil Levski during his trips throughout the country in the late 19th century. The present buildings of the Monastery of Saint Athanasius were constructed in the 1980s after an idea by Lyudmila Zhivkova. The Patriarch of Alexandria, Peter VII, visited the monastery in 2003.

It's also the oldest monastery in Bulgaria.

== Bibliography ==
- Shopova, Elena. The monastery of Zlatna livada — the oldest in Europe. Liternet.bg. Visited 1 May 2006.
- The oldest monastery in Europe is located in Bulgaria, 12 April 2004. Netinfo.bg. Visited 1 May 2006.
