= Shahdost =

Persian bishop

Saint Shahdost
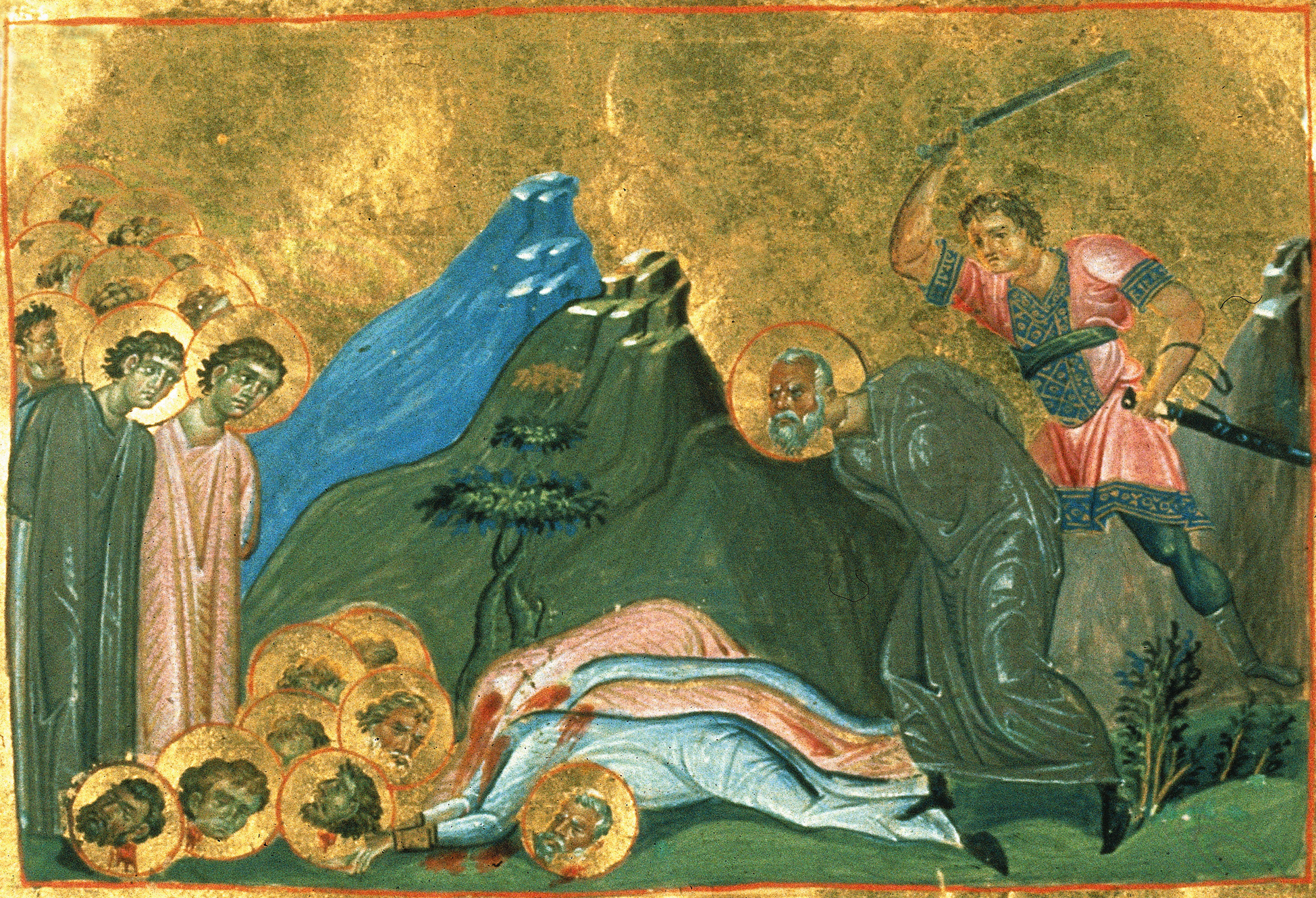
- Shahdost depicted in the Menologion of Basil II
- Born: Beth Garmai, or possibly Susa
- Died: c. 343; Ctesiphon
- Venerated in: Catholic Church; Eastern Orthodox Church; Oriental Orthodox Church; Assyrian Church of the East
- Attributes: Bishop

Shahdost, also Sadoc, Sadoth (Greek: Σαδωθ) (Classical Syriac: ܫܗܕܘܣܬ) was Bishop of Seleucia-Ctesiphon and primate of the Church of the East from 341 to 343 who resided in the Sasanian Empire. He was martyred during the great persecution of Shapur II. Like several other early bishops of Seleucia-Ctesiphon, he is included in the traditional list of patriarchs of the Church of the East. He is considered a saint in several Eastern Christian denominations.

== Sources ==
Brief accounts of Shadost's episcopate and martyrdom are given in the Ecclesiastical Chronicle of the Jacobite writer Bar Hebraeus (floruit 1280) and in the ecclesiastical histories of the Nestorian writers Mari (twelfth-century), ʿAmr (fourteenth-century) and Sliba (fourteenth-century). A more substantial account of his patriarchate is also given in the Chronicle of Seert. In all these accounts he is anachronistically called 'catholicus' or 'patriarch', a term that was only applied to the primates of the Church of the East in the fifth century.

== Shahdost's episcopate and martyrdom ==
The earliest, and most substantial account of Shadost's episcopate and martyrdom is given in the ninth-century Chronicle of Seert:

The name Shahdost is Persian and it means a lover and devotee of the king (< shāh 'king' and dūst 'friend'). The Shahdust of Ctesiphon was from Beth Garmai, though some people say he was from Susa. He was the archdeacon of Shemʿon Bar Sabbaʿe. Since, after the death of Shemʿon, the church was without a leader, he gave himself to our Lord Jesus Christ and was named patriarch secretly. He was a good and pious man. It is said that the fathers and the faithful, meeting in secret, prayed to God, then wrote down several names and drew them by lot. The name of Shahdost was drawn. He accepted the charge that had been entrusted to him without being discouraged by the fear of death, and received the investiture of the patriarchate in the house of a Christian. He chose some men and ordained them to replace the fathers who had been martyred with the holy Mar Shemʿon. Among them was Barbaʿshmin, the nephew of Shemʿon bar Sabbaʿe. They pledged themselves to die on behalf of their flocks. They began to visit the Christians night and day to encourage them against the persecution of Shapur. Finally, Shahdost's rank was discovered, and he was arrested by the magi. Three nights earlier, he had seen in a dream a ladder, with its foot on the earth and its head in heaven. Shemʿon was standing on the ladder, and said, 'Shahdost, climb up to me on this ladder, as I climbed it yesterday.' He knew what this signified. He spoke of it to the faithful, who were alarmed on his account. Then, three days later, he was arrested in Seleucia-Ctesiphon with 128 bishops, priests, deacons and Christian men and women. They remained in prison for five months, suffering all kinds of tortures. They were urged to embrace the religion of the magi, but they remained firm in their faith. The satrap of Seleucia-Ctesiphon then ordered 120 of them to be killed, but he sent Shahdost with the Christian women to Shapur. When the patriarch came before him, the king said to him, 'I have killed Shemʿon, the head of the Christians, and a large number of abbots and bishops. Why have you become the head of the people that I detest?' Shahdost replied, 'The head of the Christians is the Most High God. It is he who gives them the head of his choice. The sea will never be drained dry, and Christianity will never be destroyed. The more Christians you kill, the more they will multiply.' The accursed man grew angry with him, then he treated him gently, hoping to persuade him to worship the sun, and talked to him in a friendly manner in the hope of converting him to the religion of the magi. But far from converting him, he got nothing back from him but energetic and harsh words and the most lively resistance. He then ordered his death, and this order was carried out in the same spot where Shemʿon had been put to death. His companions were also killed. This happened in the month of March, after five months' incarceration. Among them were Miles al-Razi, his disciple Aborsam and several others, including Shemʿon's two sisters. The faithful collected their bodies and buried them in the church. According to this account, Shahdost was patriarch for two years and five months.

A shorter version, mostly dependent on the account in the Chronicle of Seert but with some interesting divergences, was given by the twelfth-century historian Mari:

Shahdost had a Persian name which means 'friend of the king'. He was a native of Beth Garmai (or, according to some, of Susa) and the archdeacon of the patriarch Shemʿon Bar Sabbaʿe. After his death, when the church was deprived of its leader, he devoted his life to Christ, and was consecrated patriarch in secret. He was an honest man. They say that when his name emerged when the fathers drew lots, he did not attempt to refuse the office because he feared death, and was consecrated in the house of one of the believers. He appointed many metropolitans and bishops, who went out and encouraged the faithful to stand firm and resist the perfidy of Shapur. Two years later an edict was issued by Shapur, and Shahdost was arrested. He saw in a dream Shemʿon Bar Sabbaʿe standing at the top of a ladder, who said to him, 'Shahdost, come up to me, just as I went up.' When he told the dream to the believers, they grieved for him. Three days after his dream he was arrested, along with 128 priests, deacons, monks and nuns. They were thrown into prison for five months, and subjected to tortures to make them embrace Magianism, but they stood firm. The marzban killed 120 of them, all men, but sent Shahdost and the nuns to Shapur in al-Madaʿin, who invited him to become a magus, and said that he would not allow the Christians to live unless he gave in. Shahdost replied, 'So long as there is water in the sea, there will be Christians.' The king became angry, and executed Shahdost and his companions in the month of April, after keeping them in prison for five months. Shahdost governed the church for two years and five months.

A third version, written up with a number of stylistic embellishments from the account in the Chronicle of Seert, was given by the thirteenth-century Jacobite historian Bar Hebraeus:

After Shemʿon Bar Sabbaʿe, Shahdost. This is a Persian name, signifying 'the king's friend', which the Greeks render as Sadok. This Shahdost was the archdeacon of Shemʿon Bar Sabbaʿe and his nephew by his sister, and hailed from Beth Garmai. Three months after his master's death he was secretly elected and consecrated at Seleucia. Two years later he saw in a dream fire continually ascending from the earth to heaven, and Shemʿon Bar Sabbaʿe calling him and saying, 'My brother Shahdost, enter into the joy of your Lord.' The rumour of that vision reached the impious Shapur, and the catholicus was arrested along with 118 priests, believers and monks, and two brothers of Shahdost, and they were all killed for professing the Christian faith. Shahdost is said to have been first brought into Shapur's presence, who said to him, 'I killed Shemʿon, the head of the Christians, and with him a number of bishops, and have you therefore been made the head of the people that I detest?' And that holy man replied, 'God is the head of the Christians, and he places over them whomsoever he wishes. Just as the sea never runs short of water, Christianity will never perish from the earth.' Shapur, angered by his words, ordered him to be killed along with his companions.

== See also ==
- List of patriarchs of the Church of the East

== Notes ==
Church of the East titles
Preceded by Shemon Bar Sabbae (329–341)	Catholicos-Patriarch of the Church of the East; Bishop of Seleucia-Ctesiphon (341–343)	Succeeded by Barba'shmin (343–346)
