= Persian martyr acts =

Syriac Christian martyrological texts from the Sasanian Empire

The Persian martyr acts are a collection of Syriac literature that is concerned with martyrdom narratives of Christians under the Sasanian Empire, which officially practiced the religion of Zoroastrianism. These writings were composed from late antiquity into the Islamic period, and describe Christians executed, tortured, exiled, or otherwise persecuted by Sasanian officials and religious leaders. The works range from brief notices and lists of martyrs to elaborate hagiographical narratives with speeches, biblical typology, miracle stories, relic traditions, and accounts of shrines.

The texts are among the most important narrative sources for the self-understanding of Christians in Sasanian Iran and Mesopotamia. They are a diverse group of texts; some have a plausible historical core whereas other are largely legendary or were written long after the events that they are about. They therefore can be used both as sources for the history of Sasanian Christianity, and as works of literature that shaped communical identity and memory in Christian circles.

The single largest group of acts are set during the reign of Shapur II (r. 309-379); the martyrs of Persia under Shapur II are thought to have been the greatest in number, in a period of particularly intense persecution, compared to any other Persian emperor. Persian martyr acts were also set during the reigns of other emperors such as Yazdegerd I, Bahram V, Yazdegerd II, Kavad I, Khosrow I, Hormizd IV, and Khosrow II. Later works continued to use Sasanian settings and martyrdom motifs after the end of Sasanian rule, including texts composed or reshaped in the early Islamic and medieval periods.

== Definition and scope ==
The designation "Persian Martyr Acts" refers to Syriac martyrological texts about Christians in, or imaginatively connected with, the Sasanian Persian world. People from a great variety of backgrounds could figure at the center of these texts, including: bishops, monks, ascetics, nobles, women, children, royal officials, military men, and converts from Zoroastrianism to Christianity. A common theme in these texts is the tension between the confession of the Christian faith and the religious-political order of the empire, which were often at odds. Confessors were tried by judges, accused of being disloyal to the empire, and attempts were made into interrogating and compelling them into Zoroastrianism.

Different "acts" could appear as standalone texts, or in larger hagiographical collections, or they might have circulated in translated and adapted forms. Translations were made into Greek, Arabic, Armenian, Georgian, Sogdian, and more.

== Historical background ==
Christianity was introduced into the Sasanian Empire in late antiquity, especially in Mesopotamia and western Iran. After the conversion of the Roman Empire to Christianity over the fourth century, Sasanian Christianity came to be increasingly associated with the rivalries between Rome and Persia; Sasanian Christianity became politicized and periods of intense rivalry between the empires resulted in intensified persecution of local Christians in the Sasanian realm, most notably under Shapur II in the mid-fourth century.

Recent scholarship has emphasized that the picture of Sasanian persecution in the acts cannot simply be read as a continuous state policy against all Christians. The surviving narratives are products of Christian literary memory, and the persecutions they describe appear to have been episodic, localized, and often directed at particular groups, such as ecclesiastical leaders, ascetics, or converts from Zoroastrian and elite Persian backgrounds. At the same time, the acts reflect real pressures faced by Christians whose religious affiliation could become politically charged, especially when Christian identity was met with questions of loyalty to the empire, the ongoing Roman–Persian wars, and conversion away from Zoroastrianism.

== Development of the genre ==
=== Shapur II and the fourth-century cycles ===
The largest cluster of Persian martyr narratives are set under Shapur II. Works assigned to this time period concern Shemon bar Sabbae, Shahdost, Tarbo, the Forty Martyrs, Miles, Pinhas, Ma'in, the martyrs of Beth Garmai and Beth Slokh, and many others.

The Martyrdom and History of Shemon bar Sabbae became central works in the Shapur II cycle. Simeon, the bishop of Seleucia-Ctesiphon, is portrayed as a leader of the Persian Church who suffers during Shapur's persecution. Other Shapur-era works, such as the Acts of Miles, the Martyrdom of Zebina and his Companions, and the Forty Martyrs of Beth Kashkraye, present different literary forms and different degrees of historical anchoring. The manuscripts for these works suggest that the narratives in their extant form were probably composed in the fifth century, even though they are set in the fourth.

=== Fifth-century persecutions ===
A second group of texts is associated with two fifth-century Sasanian rulers, Yazdegerd I and Bahram V. This period is notable, because the early period of Yazdegerd I's reign was a time of formal recognition and increasing ecclesiastical organization for the Persian Church. Late during his reign, however, an episode of anti-Christian persecution took place. The martyrs in these accounts are associated with regions including Beth Raziqaye, Adiabene, Beth Garmai, and Khuzestan, and some headings present them as martyred in the imperial capital of Seleucia-Ctesiphon.

Sebastian Brock's guide of martyrdoms in the reigns of Yazdegerd II and later fifth-century rulers include Adur-Hormizd and Anahid, the martyrs of Karka d-Beth Slokh, Pethion, Yazdin, Tahmazgard, Saba, and related figures under Yazdegerd II. Several of these and related later texts present the conflict not only as a struggle between Christians and the state but as a struggle over kinship, elite status, and inherited Zoroastrian identity, since protagonists such as Adur-Hormizd, Anahid, Pethion, Grigor, and Yazd-panah are depicted as Persian or Zoroastrian converts.

=== Sixth-century aristocratic converts ===
In the sixth century, Persian martyr narratives increasingly feature elite converts from Zoroastrianism. The Martyrdom of Mar Grigor Piran-Gušnasp and the Martyrdom of Mar Yazd-panah are about two Persian aristocrats killed under Khosrow I. Grigor is presented as a high military official and Yazd-panah as a dignitary and judge. Both converted from Zoroastrianism to Christianity. While Christians in sixth-century Persia generally had freedom in many settings, converts from Zoroastrian Persian families could still face pressure, harassment, or execution.

The sixth-century acts often feature extended theological and religious debates. Through the inclusion of these accounts, the Persian acts became not only narratives for the memory of Christian martyrs but vehicles for Christian doctrine and perspective tailored to the situation of Christians living alongside Zoroastrians, Jews, Manichaeans, and other religious communities.

=== Post-Sasanian and medieval works ===
Some works in the wider Persian martyr tradition were composed or substantially reshaped after the end of Sasanian rule. The Martyrs of Mount Berain was written after the Arab conquest while looking back to a Shapur II setting. The History of the Slave of Christ is a post-Sasanian work, probably composed between about 650 and 850, that circulated in Syriac, Arabic, Armenian, and Georgian forms and became popular across several Christian cultures. The History of Mar Behnam and Sarah, though set in a legendary Sasanian past, was probably composed in the middle of the twelfth century and is closely connected with the cult, shrine, and monastic identity of Mar Behnam near Mosul.

These later works show that the Persian martyr tradition remained useful long after the Sasanian Empire had disappeared. Sasanian settings could provide a symbolic world in which later Syriac Christian communities explored conversion, sanctity, family conflict, aristocratic identity, monastic memory, and local pilgrimage.

== Major works ==
| Work or cluster | Usual setting | Description |
|---|---|---|
| Martyrdom and History of Shemon bar Sabbae | Reign of Shapur II | Narratives concerning the bishop of Seleucia-Ctesiphon and one of the central figures of the Shapur II persecution cycle. |
| Acts of Miles | Reign of Shapur II | A narrative about the bishop Miles that combines martyrdom, episcopal conflict, and traditions also known to Greek ecclesiastical historians. |
| Martyrdom of Zebina and his Companions | Reign of Shapur II | One of the Shapur II acts translated with the Acts of Miles and the Forty Martyrs of Beth Kashkraye; its extant form is probably fifth-century. |
| Forty Martyrs of Beth Kashkraye | Reign of Shapur II | A group-martyrdom narrative associated with Beth Kashkraye and the Shapur II cycle. |
| History of the Holy Mar Ma'in | Reign of Shapur II | A Syriac work in which the memory of a Persian martyr is embedded in a larger hagiographical tradition; Brock's edition also includes a guide to the broader corpus. |
| Story of Mar Pinhas | Late fourth- or early fifth-century setting | A short Syriac narrative about the life, martyrdom, and relics of Mar Pinhas, linked in the tradition to the circle of Mar Awgen. |
| Yazdegerd I martyr texts | Reign of Yazdegerd I | A group of five short Syriac martyr narratives associated with a brief persecution near the end of Yazdegerd's reign. |
| Acts of Adhurhormizd, Pethion and Anahid and related fifth-century works | Reign of Yazdegerd II | Brock's guide lists these and related Yazdegerd II works among acts concerning Persian martyrs; several involve converts from Zoroastrian or Persian elite settings. |
| Martyrdom of Mar Grigor Piran-Gušnasp | Reign of Khosrow I | A sixth-century narrative about a Persian aristocrat and military figure who converts from Zoroastrianism and is executed. |
| Martyrdom of Mar Yazd-panah | Reign of Khosrow I | A companion narrative concerning a Persian judge and dignitary who becomes Christian and is executed. |
| Martyrs of Mount Berain | Set under Shapur II; composed after the Arab conquest | A legendary narrative of Adarparwa, Mihrnarse, and Mahdukht, composed by Gabriel of Shahrzor and connected with continuing devotion to Mahdukht. |
| History of the Slave of Christ | Post-Sasanian, with a Persian martyr setting | A Syriac narrative that circulated in several languages and recensions; its composition is usually placed between about 650 and 850. |
| History of Mar Behnam and Sarah | Legendary Sasanian setting; medieval composition | A twelfth-century Syriac martyr narrative about royal children whose story became tied to the monastery and shrine of Mar Behnam. |

== Literary features ==
The Persian martyr acts belong to the wider late antique Christian tradition of martyrology and hagiography. They frequently use biblical models, especially the Maccabean martyrs, Danielic resistance to imperial cult, the passion of Christ, and stories of apostolic endurance. Martyrs are often portrayed as athletes, soldiers, judges of their judges, or imitators of Christ. Their trials become public dramas in which the saint's speech displays doctrinal knowledge and spiritual authority. Their opponents, from imperial servants to the Zoroastrian priestly class, unwittingly reveal the injustice or weakness of their position through dialogue and their polemics.

The texts also contain recurring Sasanian and Iranian motifs. Zoroastrian priests may appear as magi, judges, or advisers to the king. Martyrs are urged to honor fire, the sun, or royal commands; converts are accused of abandoning their ancestral religion; and noble converts are presented as renouncing family status and wealth for their faith. These scenes are highly stylized, but they preserve Christian perceptions of the wider Zoroastrian and Sasanian world.

Another recurrent theme in this literature is family conflict. Christian conversion often resulted in division in households, often producing tensions parents and their children. The History of Mar Behnam and Sarah turns the martyrdom of royal children into a story about conversion, healing, pilgrimage, and the foundation of a local cult. The Martyrs of Mount Berain similarly gives prominence to Mahdukht, whose later cult continued to be remembered in connection with Mount Berain.

Relics and sacred places are central to many narratives. A common relic was the body of the martyr or the location of the martyrdom. The location could become a place of local pilgrimage or the origins of a monastery.

== Historicity and interpretation ==
While indispensable, Persian martyr acts are not unbiased sources for the history of Christianity in the Sasanian Empire. Thus, the study of these texts in scholarship has been extended from a sole focus on the evidence they play for the history of persecution, to also considering their literary, theoloigcal, and social roles in Christian communities. Some accounts are broadly historical, whereas others are simply legendary. Furthermore, these works should not be treated as suggesting that anti-Christian persecution was uniform or unending. While more widespread persecutions could take place, persecution was also frequently periodic and regional, or arose under certain social conditions.

Source criticism is especially necessary because the date of a narrative is not always the same as the date of the events it describes. Some texts set under Shapur II appear to have been composed in the fifth century. The Martyrs of Mount Berain was written around the early Islamic period despite its fourth-century setting. The History of Mar Behnam and Sarah is set in a legendary Sasanian past but probably belongs to the twelfth century. These chronological gaps are not only important for assessing the historicity of the story, but for understanding how the martyrdom of Persian Christians became a durable vehicle for the expression of Syriac Christian identity over the ages.

The Persian martyr acts also reveal extensive Christian engagement with Iranian culture. They engage with traditions of Persian royal authority, Persian status, court service, Zoroastrianism, and so on. Therefore, the corpus of writings is not merely a record of Christian-Zoroastrian conflict but also reveals the nuance of how Sasanian Christians received and engaged with their world across political, social, and cultural dimensions.

== Manuscripts and editions ==
The acts survive in a wide and uneven manuscript tradition. An extensive survey and catalogue of the manuscript tradition and critical Syriac editions produced of these texts has been written by Sebastian Brock. The main scholar responsible for curating critical editions of these works was Paul Bedjan, in his Acta Martyrum et Sanctorum, though he often relied on late manuscripts. Over time, many more critical editions of these works have been produced alongside more detailed studies of their content.

The modern Persian Martyr Acts in Syriac series has published editions and English translations of many works, including the History of the Holy Mar Ma'in, the Story of Mar Pinhas, the Martyrdom and History of Shemon bar Sabbae, the Martyrs of Mount Berain, the Yazdegerd I martyr texts, the History of the Slave of Christ, the History of Mar Behnam and Sarah, the Martyrdom of Grigor Piran-Gušnasp, the Martyrdom of Yazd-panah, and several Shapur II martyr texts.

== Translations ==
Syriac accounts of Persian martyrs were often circulated into other languages; Greek historians such as Sozomen preserve notices related to Persian martyrs, and many complete Greek translations of these works were written. The History of the Slave of Christ is attested in Syriac, Arabic, Armenian, and Georgian forms, showing the appeal of Persian martyr themes across Christian literary cultures. Sogdian versions of Persian martyr acts found in the Turfan oasis show that some stories travelled into Christian communities of Central Asia, where Syriac Christian literature was translated and adapted in Sogdian, Old Turkic, Middle Persian, and related manuscript cultures.

== Reception and significance ==
The Persian martyr acts helped define Syriac Christian memory of life under the Sasanian Empire. They gave local communities saints, feast days, relic histories, and stories of endurance that could be reused in liturgy, preaching, monastic commemoration, and pilgrimage. In some cases, the texts also explained the prestige of particular shrines. The History of Mar Behnam and Sarah is closely tied to the monastery of Mar Behnam and its inscriptions, artistic production, and cultic landscape. The Martyrs of Mount Berain likewise shows the persistence of devotion to Mahdukht in a local sacred geography.

The corpus has broader importance for the study of late antique and medieval Christianity. It preserves Syriac Christian perspectives on the Sasanian state, Zoroastrian religious authority, conversion, aristocratic identity, martyr cult, and the movement of stories across languages and regions. At the same time, its legendary and rhetorical features require careful use. The Persian martyr acts are best read not as neutral transcripts of persecution but as literary works through which Christians interpreted suffering, imagined imperial power, and located their communities within the religious world of Iran and Mesopotamia.

== See also ==
- Acts of Adur-Hormizd, Pethion and Anahid
- Church of the East
- Christianity in Iran
- Christianity in the Sasanian Empire
- Mar Behnam
- Shapur II
- Shemon bar Sabbae
- Syriac Christianity
- Syriac literature
