= Karka d-Ledan =

Heritage-listed archaeological site in Khuzestan, Iran

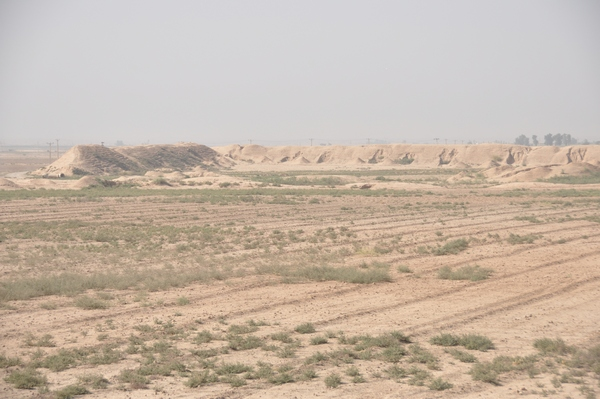
- The site of Ivan-e Kerkha, identified with the city of Karka d-Ledan

- Location of the site in Iran
- 32°19′52″N 48°07′21″E
- Type: Archaeological site
- Location: Khuzestan, Khuzestan province, Iran

History
- (Re)founded: 338 CE
- Founder: Shapur II

Iran National Heritage List
- Official name: Iwan-e Karkheh
- Type: Ruins
- Designated: 1931
- Reference no.: 47
- Conservation organization: Cultural Heritage, Handicrafts and Tourism Organization of Iran

Karka d-Ledan, also known as Eranshahr-Shapur, and Eran asan kar(t) Kavad, is an archaeological site that was one of the four Sasanian major cities in the former settlement of Khuzestan, in the modern-day province of Khuzestan, Iran.

It was (re)founded by King of Kings (shahanshah) Shapur II (r. 309–379) in 338 CE, who had a winter palace established there. Karka d-Ledan is identified with the modern site of Ivan-e Kerkha.
