= Shemon bar Sabbae =

Patriarch of the Church of the East

Saint Simeon bar Sabbae
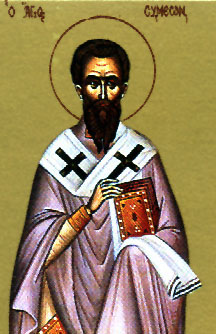
- Born: 3rd century
- Died: Good Friday, 345; Sassanid Empire
- Venerated in: Assyrian Church of the East; Ancient Church of the East; Catholic Church; Oriental Orthodox churches Eastern Orthodox Church
- Feast: 14 April (Syriac Christianity); 17 April (Greek Orthodox Churches and Greek Catholic Churches); Sixth Friday of Qaitha (Summer) (Syro-Malabar Catholic Church); 17 April and 21 April (Latin Church) variable date in August (Assyrian Church of the East)

Mar Shimun Bar Sabbae (Classical Syriac: ܡܪܝ ܫܡܥܘܢ ܒܪܨܒܥܐ, romanized: Shemʿon bar Ṣabbaʿe; died Good Friday, 345) was the Bishop of Seleucia-Ctesiphon from Persia, the de facto head of the Church of the East, maintaining this position until his death. He was bishop in the Sasanian Empire during the persecutions of Shapur II against Christians and he was executed along with many of his followers, after refusing to renounce Christianity and convert to Zoroastrianism.

an event that came to be recorded in the Persian martyr acts. He is revered as a saint in various Christian communions.

== Biography ==
Shimun Bar Sabbae was born the son of a fuller. He had two sisters, one of which was named Tarbula.

There is some scholarly debate on what "bar Sabbae" means. In Syriac, his native tongue, bar translates to “son of”. Ṣabbā’ē means dyers, so altogether his name means “son of the dyers.” Butler stated that Simeon was surnamed Barsaboe and that it signified that he was the son of a fuller according to the naming customs of the area.

In 316, he had been named the coadjutor bishop following his predecessor, Papa bar Gaggai, in Seleucia-Ctesiphon (now al-Mada'in). He was later accused of being a friend of the Roman emperor and of maintaining secret correspondences with him. On that basis, Shapur II ordered the execution of all Christian priests. It is also thought that a reason for this order was that Shemon had supposedly converted the king's mother Ifra Hormizid to Christianity.

Since Shemon would not convert to Zoroastrianism, he was beheaded along with several thousand Christians, including bishops, priests, and the faithful. These included the priests Abdella (or Abdhaihla), Ananias (Hannanja), Chusdazat (Guhashtazad, Usthazan, or Gothazat), and Pusai (Fusik), Askitrea, the daughter of Pusai, the eunuch Azad (Asatus) and several other companions, numbered at either 1150 or 100. Sozomen, a historian of the 5th century maintained that the numbers of the dead martyrs was registered at 16,000. Another historian, Al-Masoudy from the 10th century, claimed that there were around 200,000 Christians killed. They are commemorated on:

- 17 April (2004 Roman Martyrology) and 21 April (1956 Roman Martyrolgy) in the Roman Rite of Catholic Church
- the Friday after Easter in the Syriac Orthodox Church
- 17 April in the Eastern Orthodox Churches and Greek Catholic Churches
- The 6th Friday of Summer in the Assyrian Church of the East

Church of the East titles
Preceded by Papa (c. 280–317); Vacant (317–329)	Catholicos-Patriarch of the Church of the East; Bishop of Seleucia-Ctesiphon (329–341)	Succeeded by Shahdost (341–343)
