= List of early Christian saints =

This is a list of 1,089 early Christian saints before 450 AD in alphabetical order by Christian name.

== Alphabetical list ==
Christian saints before 450 AD
| Saint | Date of death |
|---|---|
| Aaron the Illustrious | 4th century |
| Abadios | 4th century |
| Abai (martyr) | 4th century |
| Abāmūn of Tarnūt | 4th century |
| Abanoub | 4th century |
| Abassad | 4th century |
| Abban the Hermit | 5th century |
| Abda and Abdjesus | 4th century |
| Abda of Kaskhar | 4th or 5th century |
| Abdecalas | 345 |
| Abdias of Babylon | 1st century |
| Abdisho | 4th century |
| Abdon | 3rd century |
| Abercius and Helena | 1st century |
| Abercius of Hieropolis | 2nd century |
| Abgar V of Edessa | 1st century |
| Abiatha, Hathes and Mamlacha | 4th century |
| Abiathar and Sidonia | 4th century |
| Abibion | 5th century |
| Abibus of Edessa | 4th century |
| Abibus of Samosata | 3rd century |
| Abra of Poitiers | 4th century |
| Abraham and his wife | 4th century |
| Abraham of Arbela | 4th century |
| Abraham of Armenia | 5th century |
| Abraham of Clermont | 5th century |
| Abraham of Cyrrhus | 422 |
| Abraham of the High Mountain | 5th century |
| Abraham the Great of Kidunja | 4th century |
| Abraham the Poor | 4th century |
| Absadah | 4th century |
| Abselema of Edessa | 2nd century |
| Abudimus | 4th century |
| Abundius | 5th century |
| Abundius and Abundantius | 4th century |
| Abundius and Irenaeus | 3rd century |
| Abundius of Umbria | 4th century |
| Acacius of Amida | 5th century |
| Acacius of Caesarea | 4th century |
| Acacius of Sebaste | 4th century |
| Acathius of Melitene | 3rd century |
| Acepsimas of Hnaita | 4th century |
| Achillas of Alexandria | 4th century |
| Achilleus | 1st century |
| Achillius of Larissa | 4th century |
| Acius | 4th century |
| Addai | 2nd century |
| Adheritus | 2nd century |
| Adrian of Nicomedia | c. 306 |
| Aelia Flaccilla | 4th century |
| Aemilianus | 5th century |
| Afra | 304 |
| Agape (Charity or Love) | 2nd century ? |
| Agape, Chionia, and Irene | 3rd century |
| Agapitus of Palestrina | 3rd century |
| Agapius | 4th century |
| Agapius of Spain | 3rd century |
| Agatha of Sicily | 251 |
| Agathangelus of Rome | 4th century |
| Agathius | 303 |
| Agathoclia | 3rd century |
| Agathonicus and Companions | 3rd century |
| Agnes | 304 |
| Agnes of Rome | 4th century |
| Agricius of Trier | 4th century |
| Agrippina of Mineo | 3rd century |
| Agrippinus of Carthage | 3rd century |
| Agrippinus of Naples | 3rd century |
| Aignan | 5th century |
| Ajabel | 4th century |
| Alban | 305 |
| Alban of Mainz | 406 |
| Alberta of Agen | 296 |
| Alexander (martyr) | 2nd century |
| Alexander I | c. 116 |
| Alexander of Alexandria | 4th century |
| Alexander of Bergamo | 4th century |
| Alexander of Comana | 3rd century |
| Alexander of Constantinople | 4th century |
| Alexander of Jerusalem | 3rd century |
| Alexius | 5th century |
| Alexius of Rome | 4th century |
| Almachius | 4th century |
| Alphius (martyr) | 3rd century |
| Alypius of Thagaste | 5th century |
| Amabilis of Riom | 5th century |
| Amantius of Como | 5th century |
| Amator | 5th century |
| Ambrose | 397 |
| Ambrose of Alexandria | 3rd century |
| Ampelus | 4th century |
| Amphibalus | 4th century |
| Amphilochius of Iconium | 4th century |
| Ampliatus | 1st century |
| Amun | 4th century |
| Anacletus | c. 88 |
| Ananias of Damascus | 1st century |
| Anastasia of Sirmium | 4th century |
| Anastasius I | 401 |
| Anastasius the Fuller | 4th century |
| Andeolus | 3rd century |
| Andrew | 1st century |
| Saint Andrew of Sardis | 2nd century |
| Andronicus of Pannonia | 1st century |
| Andronicus, Probus, and Tarachus | 4th century |
| Anianus of Alexandria | 1st century |
| Anicetus | c. 167 |
| Anne | 1st century |
| Ansanus | 4th century |
| Anterus | 3rd century |
| Antheros | 236 |
| Anthimus of Nicomedia | 4th century |
| Anthimus of Rome | 4th century |
| Anthony the Great | 356 |
| Antiochus of Sulcis | 2nd century |
| Antipas of Pergamum | 1st century |
| Antonia and Alexander | 4th century |
| Anysia of Salonika | 304 |
| Apelles of Heraklion | 1st century |
| Aphian | 4th century |
| Aphrahat | 4th century |
| Aphrodisius | 1st century |
| Apollinaris of Ravenna | 1st century |
| Apollinaris Claudius | 2nd century |
| Apollonia | 3rd century |
| Apollonius the Apologist | 2nd century |
| Apollos | 1st century |
| Aquilina | 3rd century |
| Arcadius of Mauretania | 4th century |
| Archippus | 1st century |
| Ariadne of Phrygia | 2nd century |
| Arilda | 5th century |
| Aristarchus of Thessalonica | 1st century |
| Aristides the Athenian | 2nd century |
| Aristobulus of Britannia | 1st century |
| Arsatius | 5th century |
| Arsenius the Great | 5th century |
| Artemius | 4th century |
| Aspren | 1st century |
| Assicus | 5th century |
| Asterius of Amasia | 4th century |
| Astius | 2nd century |
| Asyncritus of Hyrcania | 1st century |
| Athanasius II of Alexandria | 5th century |
| Athanasius of Alexandria | 373 |
| Atticus of Constantinople | 5th century |
| Attilio | 3rd century |
| Audomar | 670 |
| Audoin (bishop) | 684 |
| Augustine of Hippo | 430 |
| Aurelius | 5th century |
| Auspicius of Toul | 5th century |
| Auspicius of Trier | 2nd century |
| Austromoine | 3rd century |
| Autonomus | 4th century |
| Auxentius of Bithynia | 5th century |
| Auxentius of Mopsuestia | 4th century |
| Auxilius of Ireland | 5th century |
| Avilius of Alexandria | 1st century |
| Awtel | 327 |
| Babylas of Antioch | 3rd century |
| Bademus | 4th century |
| Balbina | 2nd century |
| Barbara | 3rd century |
| Barba'shmin | 4th century |
| Barhadbesciabas | 4th century |
| Barlaam and Josaphat | 4th century |
| Barnabas | 61 |
| Bartholomew | 1st century |
| Basil of Amasea | 4th century |
| Basil of Ancyra | 4th century |
| Basil the Elder | 4th century |
| Basil the Great | 379 |
| Basilides and Potamiana | 3rd century |
| Basilides, Cyrinus, Nabor and Nazarius | 4th century |
| Basilissa and Anastasia | 1st century |
| Bassian | 5th century |
| Baudilus | 3rd century |
| Beatrix | 302 or 303 |
| Beatus of Lungern | 2nd century |
| Benignus of Armagh | 5th century |
| Benignus of Dijon | 3rd century |
| Saint Benjamin the Deacon and Martyr | 5th century |
| Bessus | 3rd century |
| Bibiana | 4th century |
| Bienheuré | 3rd century |
| Birillus | 1st century |
| Blaise | c. 316 |
| Blandina | 2nd century |
| Boniface I | 422 |
| Boniface of Tarsus | 3rd century |
| Breage | 5th century |
| Bretannio | 4th century |
| Brice | 5th century |
| Brychan | 5th century |
| Caesar of Dyrrhachium | 1st century |
| Caesarius of Africa | 2nd or 3rd century |
| Caesarius of Nazianzus | 4th century |
| Caius | 296 |
| Calepodius | 3rd century |
| Calimerius | 3rd century |
| Callixtus I | 222 |
| Calocerus | 2nd century |
| Camilla | 5th century |
| Candida the Elder | 1st century |
| Candidus | 3rd century |
| Cantius, Cantianus, and Cantianilla | 4th century |
| Caprasius of Agen | 4th century |
| Caprasius of Lérins | 5th century |
| Carpophorus, Exanthus, Cassius, Severinus, Secundus, and Licinius | 3rd century |
| Carpus of Berrhoe | 1st century |
| Cassian of Imola | 3rd or 4th century |
| Cassian of Tangier | 3rd century |
| Castor of Apt | 5th century |
| Castritian | 2nd century |
| Castulus | 3rd century |
| Catald | 5th century |
| Catervus | 4th century |
| Catherine of Alexandria | c. 305 |
| Cecilia | c. 176–180 |
| Celadion of Alexandria | 2nd century |
| Celestine I | 432 |
| Cephas of Iconium | 1st century |
| Cessianus | 4th century |
| Charalampus | c. 222 |
| Charbel (martyr) | 2nd century |
| Charitina of Amisus | 4th century |
| Chiaffredo | 3rd century |
| Saint Christina of Bolsena | 3rd century |
| Christina of Persia | 4th century |
| Christopher | c. 251 |
| Chromatius | 5th century |
| Chrysanthus | 283 |
| Chrysogonus | 4th century |
| Chusdazat | 4th century |
| Cianán | 5th century |
| Clateus | 1st century |
| Claudia Procula | 1st century |
| Clement I | c. 98 |
| Clement of Alexandria | 3rd century |
| Clement of Ancyra | 4th century |
| Clement of Sardice | 1st century |
| Cleopatra | 4th century |
| Colluthus | 3rd century |
| Columba of Sens | 3rd century |
| Conal | 5th century |
| Concordius of Spoleto | 2nd century |
| Constance of Rome | 4th century |
| Constantine the Great | 337 |
| Constantius (Theban Legion) | 3rd century |
| Constantius of Perugia | 2nd century |
| Corebus | 2nd century |
| Corentin of Quimper | 5th century |
| Cornelius | 253 |
| Cornelius the Centurion | 1st century |
| Cosmas and Damian | 303 |
| Crescens | 1st century |
| Crescentian | 2nd century |
| Crescentinus | 4th century |
| Crescentius of Rome | 4th century |
| Crispin | 3rd century |
| Crispina | 304 |
| Crispus of Chalcedon | 1st century |
| Cucuphas | 4th century |
| Cyprian | 258 |
| Cyprian of Antioch | 4th century |
| Cyriacus | 3rd or 4th century |
| Cyril of Alexandria | 444 |
| Cyril of Jerusalem | 386 |
| Cyrion and Candidus | 4th century |
| Cyrus and John | 4th century |
| Dabheog | 4th century |
| Dalmatius of Constantinople | 5th century |
| Damasus I | 383 |
| Daniel of Padua | 2nd century |
| Daniel the Stylite | 5th century |
| Darerca of Ireland | 5th century |
| Daria | c. 283 |
| Darius | 4th century |
| Dasya | 3rd century |
| Dausa (bishop) | 4th century |
| Defendens | 3rd century |
| Demetrius of Alexandria | 232 |
| Demetrius of Thessaloniki | 306 |
| Demiana | 3rd or 4th century |
| Denis (Denys, Dionysius) of Paris | 3rd century |
| Denise, Dativa, Leontia, Tertius, Emilianus, Boniface, Majoricus, and Servus | 5th century |
| Desan (bishop) | 4th century |
| Devota | 4th century |
| Diadochos of Photiki | 5th century |
| Dichu | 5th century |
| Didymus the Blind | 4th century |
| Digain | 5th century |
| Digna and Emerita | 3rd century |
| Dingad of Llandingat | 5th century |
| Diomedes | 4th century |
| Dionysius | 268 |
| Dionysius of Alexandria | 3rd century |
| Dionysius the Areopagite | 1st or 2nd century |
| Dionysius, Bishop of Corinth | 2nd century |
| Dioscorus | 4th century |
| Dioscorus I of Alexandria | 5th century |
| Dismas | 1st century |
| Domninus of Fidenza | 4th century |
| Donatus of Arezzo | 4th century |
| Donatus, Romulus, Secundian, and 86 Companions | 4th century |
| Dorothea of Alexandria | 4th century |
| Dorothea of Caesarea | c. 311 |
| Dorotheus of Tyre | 362 |
| Duje | 4th century |
| Dwynwen | 5th century |
| Edistus | 1st century |
| Elen (saint) | 4th century |
| Eleuchadius | 2nd century |
| Eleutherius and Antia | 2nd century |
| Eleutherius | c. 189 |
| Elias and companions | 4th century |
| Elias the Hermit | 4th century |
| Elizabeth | 1st century |
| Elpidius the Cappadocian | 4th century |
| Elpis (Hope) | 2nd century ? |
| Eluned | 5th century |
| Emelia | c. 375 |
| Emerentiana | c. 304 |
| Emeterius and Celedonius | 4th century |
| Emmelia of Caesarea | 4th century |
| Emygdius | 4th century |
| Engratia | 4th century |
| Epaphroditus | 1st century |
| Epenetus of Carthage | 1st century |
| Ephrem the Syrian | 373 |
| Ephysius | 4th century |
| Epicharis (martyr) | 3rd century |
| Epiphanius of Pavia | 5th century |
| Epiphanius of Salamis | 403 |
| Erasmus of Formiae (St. Elmo) | c. 303 |
| Erastus of Paneas | 1st century |
| Erbin of Dumnonia | 5th century |
| Erc | 5th century |
| Eubulus | 4th century |
| Eucherius of Lyon | c. 449 |
| Eudocia (martyr) | 100 |
| Eudokia of Heliopolis | 2nd century |
| Eugenia of Rome | 3rd century |
| Eugenios of Trebizond | 4th century |
| Eulalia of Barcelona | 4th century |
| Eulalia of Mérida | 4th century |
| Euphemia | 307 |
| Euphrasia of Constantinople | 5th century |
| Euphrosyne of Alexandria | 5th century |
| Euplius | 4th century |
| Eusebius | 309 or 310 |
| Eusebius of Rome | 4th century |
| Eusebius of Samosata | 4th century |
| Eusebius of Vercelli | 371 |
| Eusebonas | 5th century |
| Eustace | 2nd century |
| Eustathius of Antioch | 4th century |
| Eustochium | 5th century |
| Eustochius | 5th century |
| Eustorgius I | 4th century |
| Euthalia | 3rd century |
| Euthymius the Great | 5th century |
| Eutropius | 5th century |
| Eutropius of Orange | 5th century |
| Eutychian | 283 |
| Evaristus | c. 105 |
| Evellius | 1st century |
| Evodius | 1st century |
| Expeditus | 303 |
| Exuperantia | 4th century |
| Exuperius (Theban Legion) | 3rd century |
| Exuperius | 5th century |
| Exuperius and Zoe | 2nd century |
| Ezana of Axum | 4th century |
| Fabian | 250 |
| Fabiola | 399 or 400 |
| Faith | 3rd century |
| Fausta | 4th century |
| Faustinus | 302 or 303 |
| Faustinus of Brescia | 4th century |
| Faustus of Riez | 5th century |
| Faustus, Abibus and Dionysius of Alexandria | 3rd century |
| Felician of Foligno | 2nd century |
| Felicitas of Rome | c. 165 |
| Felicula | 1st century |
| Felinus and Gratian | 3rd century |
| Felix and Adauctus | 4th century |
| Felix and Costanza | 1st century |
| Felix and Regula | 3rd century |
| Felix I | 274 |
| Felix III | 5th century |
| Felix of Como | 4th century |
| Felix of Girona | 4th century |
| Felix of Nola | 3rd century |
| Fermin | 4th century |
| Ferreolus and Ferrutio | 3rd century |
| Fidelis of Como | 4th century |
| Firmilian | c. 269 |
| Firmus and Rusticus | 3rd century |
| Flavia Domitilla (also possibly her niece) | 1st century |
| Flavian II of Antioch | 5th century |
| Flavian of Constantinople | 5th century |
| Flavian of Ricina | 3rd century |
| Flavius Clement | 1st century |
| Flavius Latinus of Brescia | 2nd century |
| Florian | 4th century |
| Fortunatus of Casei | 3rd century |
| Fortunatus of Spoleto | 4th or 5th century |
| Fortunatus the Apostle | 1st century |
| Foutin | 2nd century |
| Frumentius | 4th century |
| Fulgentius of Ruspe | 6th century |
| Gabinus | 3rd century |
| Gaius of Ephesus | 1st century |
| Galation | 3rd century |
| Gamaliel | 63 |
| Gatianus of Tours | 3rd century |
| Gaudentius of Brescia | 5th century |
| Gaudentius of Rimini | 4th century |
| Gaudentius of Novara | 5th century |
| Gaudiosus of Naples | 5th century |
| Gelasius I | 5th century |
| Geminianus | 4th century |
| Genesius of Arles | 303 or 308 |
| Genesius of Rome | 286 or c. 303 |
| George | 303 |
| Georgia of Clermont | 5th century |
| Gerasimus of the Jordan | 5th century |
| Gereon | 3rd century |
| Germanicus of Smyrna | 2nd century |
| Germanus of Auxerre | 5th century |
| Gervasius and Protasius | c. 170 |
| Glyceria | 2nd century |
| Glycerius | 5th century |
| Glywys | 5th century |
| Gobnait | 5th century |
| Gordianus and Epimachus | 3rd or 4th century |
| Gorgonia | 375 |
| Gorgonius | 4th century |
| Gregory of Nazianzus | 389 |
| Gregory of Nazianzus the Elder | 4th century |
| Gregory of Nyssa | 4th or 5th century |
| Gregory of Spoleto | 304 |
| Gregory Thaumaturgus | 3rd century |
| Gregory the Illuminator | 330 |
| Gunthiern | 5th century |
| Hegesippus | 180 |
| Helena of Constantinople | c. 330 |
| Heliodorus of Altino | 4th century |
| Heliodorus of Bet Zabdai | 4th century |
| Helladius of Auxerre | 4th century |
| Heraclas of Alexandria | 3rd century |
| Herculanils | 2nd century |
| Hermagoras of Aquileia | 1st century |
| Hermas of Dalmatia | 1st century |
| Hermes | 2nd century |
| Hermes of Philippopolis | 1st century |
| Hermias | 2nd century |
| Hermione of Ephesus | 2nd century |
| Herodion of Antioch | 2nd century |
| Herodion of Patras | 1st century |
| Herta | 303 |
| Hierotheos the Thesmothete | 1st century |
| Hilarion of Cyprus | 371 |
| Hilarius | 5th century |
| Hilary of Arles | 5th century |
| Hilary of Poitiers | 367 |
| Hippolytus | 3rd century |
| Hippolytus of Rome | c. 236 |
| Holy Innocents | 6 BC |
| Honestus | 3rd century |
| Honoratus | 5th century |
| Honorina | 4th century |
| Hor, Besoy, and Daydara | 4th century |
| Hyacinth and Protus | 2nd or 3rd century |
| Hyginus | c. 140 |
| Hypatius of Bithynia | 5th century |
| Hypatius of Gangra | 4th century |
| Ia of Cornwall | 5th century |
| Iakovos o Persis (St. James of Persia) | 5th century |
| Ibar | 5th century |
| Idus of Leinster | 5th century |
| Ignatius of Antioch | c. 98–117 |
| Innocent I | 417 |
| Irenaeus of Lyons | 202 |
| Irenaeus of Sirmium | 3rd century |
| Isaac of Armenia | 5th century |
| Isaac of Dalmatia | 4th century |
| Iserninus | 5th century |
| Isidora | 4th century |
| Isidore of Alexandria | 5th century |
| Isidore of Chios | 3rd century |
| Isidore of Pelusium | 5th century |
| Jacob of Nisibis | 4th century |
| James Intercisus | 5th century |
| James, Azadanus and Abdicius | 4th century |
| James, son of Alphaeus | c. 62 |
| James, son of Zebedee | 44 |
| Januarius | 4th century |
| Jason of Tarsus | 1st century |
| Jerome | 420 |
| Joachim | 1st century |
| Joanna | 1st century |
| John and Paul | 4th century |
| John Cassian | 5th century |
| John Chrysostom | 407 |
| John of Egypt | 4th century |
| John of Senhout | 4th century |
| John the Apostle | 1st century |
| John the Baptist | c. 30 |
| John the Dwarf | 5th century |
| John the Evangelist | c. 1st century |
| Joseph of Arimathea | 1st century |
| Joseph of Nazareth | 1st century |
| Jude the Apostle | 1st century |
| Julia of Corsica | 5th century |
| Julian and Basilissa | 4th century |
| Julian of Alexandria | 2nd century |
| Julian of Antioch | 4th century |
| Julian of Le Mans | 3rd century |
| Julian of Sora | 2nd century |
| Juliana of Nicomedia | c. 304 |
| Julietta | 304 |
| Julius and Aaron | 4th century |
| Julius I | 352 |
| Julius of Novara | 4th century |
| Julius the Veteran | 4th century |
| Junia | 1st century |
| Justa and Rufina | 3rd century |
| Justin Martyr | 165 |
| Justin of Siponto | 4th century |
| Justin the Confessor | 3rd century |
| Justina of Antioch | 4th century |
| Justina of Padua | 4th century |
| Justus and Pastor | 3rd or 4th century |
| Justus of Alexandria | 2nd century |
| Justus of Beauvais | 3rd century |
| Justus of Trieste | 4th century |
| Juvenal of Benevento | 2nd century |
| Juvenal of Narni | 4th century |
| Juventinus | 4th century |
| Juventius of Pavia | 1st century |
| Kalliopi (martyr) | 250 |
| Kedron of Alexandria | 2nd century |
| Keyne | 5th century |
| Kyriaki | 300 |
| Landry of Sées | 5th century |
| Latuinus | 5th century |
| Lawrence of Rome | 258 |
| Lazarus | 99 |
| Lelia | 5th century |
| Leo I | 5th century |
| Leo I the Thracian | 5th century |
| Leocadia | 4th century |
| Leonidas | 3rd century |
| Leonides | 3rd century |
| Leontine martyrs | 5th century |
| Leontius of Autun | 5th century |
| Leontius of Caesarea | 4th century |
| Leontius of Fréjus | 5th century |
| Leontius, Hypatius and Theodulus | 1st century |
| Leucius of Brindisi | 2nd century |
| Letícia | 383? |
| Liberalis of Treviso | 4th century |
| Liborius of Le Mans | 4th century |
| Loman of Trim | 5th century |
| Longinus | 1st century |
| Lubentius | 4th century |
| Lucian of Antioch | 4th century |
| Lucian of Beauvais | 3rd century |
| Lucifer of Cagliari | 370 |
| Lucius I | 254 |
| Lucius of Britain | 2nd century |
| Lucius of Cyrene | 1st century |
| Lucy and Geminian | 3rd century |
| Lucy of Syracuse | 304 |
| Luke the Evangelist | c. 84 |
| Luperculus | 3rd century |
| Lupicinus of Lyon | 5th century |
| Lupus of Troyes | 5th century |
| Lydia of Thyatira | 1st century |
| Macarius of Alexandria | 4th century |
| Macarius of Egypt | 4th century |
| Macarius of Jerusalem | c. 335 |
| Macarius the Great | 391 |
| Macedonius of Syria | 5th century |
| Macrina the Elder | c. 340 |
| Macrina the Younger | 379 |
| Maël (saint) | 5th century |
| Magnus of Cuneo | 3rd century |
| Mambeca | 4th century |
| Mamertinus of Auxerre | 5th century |
| Mamertus | 5th century |
| Mammes of Caesarea | 3rd century |
| Mana of Bet-Parsaje | 4th century |
| Manahen | 1st century |
| Mansuetus | 4th century |
| Mar Awgin | 4th century |
| Marcella | 5th century |
| Marcellina | 398 |
| Marcellinus | 304? |
| Marcellinus and Peter | 4th century |
| Marcellinus of Carthage | 5th century |
| Marcellus I | 309 |
| Marcellus of Capua | 4th century |
| Marcellus of Tangier | 3rd century |
| Marcian | 5th century |
| Marcian of Tortona | 2nd century |
| Marciana of Mauretania | 4th century |
| Margaret of Antioch in Pisidia | 304? |
| Marina of Aguas Santas | 2nd century |
| Marinus | 4th century |
| Maris, Martha, Abachum and Audifax | 3rd century |
| Mark | 336 |
| Mark and Marcellian | 3rd century |
| Mark of Apollonias | 1st century |
| Mark the Evangelist | 68 |
| Markianos of Alexandria | 2nd century |
| Marolus | 5th century |
| Maron | 410 |
| Martha (French) | 5th century |
| Martha | 1st century |
| Martha, mother of Symeon Stylites the Younger | 551 |
| Martial | 3rd century |
| Martin of Tongeren | 4th century |
| Martin of Tours | 397 |
| Martina of Rome | 3rd century |
| Martinian and Processus | 1st century |
| Martyrs of Abitina | 4th century |
| Maruthas | 5th century |
| Mary | 1st century |
| Mary Magdalene | 1st century |
| Mary of Bethany | 1st century |
| Mary of Clopas | 1st century |
| Mary of Egypt | c. 421 |
| Materiana | 5th century |
| Maternus of Cologne | 4th century |
| Maternus of Milan | 4th century |
| Matthew the Evangelist | 1st century |
| Matthias | 80 |
| Matthias of Jerusalem | 2nd century |
| Maturinus | c. 300 |
| Maughold | 5th century |
| Maura and Britta | 4th century |
| Maurice | 287 |
| Maurus of Parentium | 3rd century |
| Maurus, Pantalemon and Sergius | 2nd century |
| Maxima of Rome | 4th century |
| Maximilian of Lorch | 3rd century |
| Maximilian of Tebessa | 3rd century |
| Maximin of Trier | 4th century |
| Maximus of Alexandria | 3rd century |
| Maximus of Aveia | 3rd century |
| Maximus of Évreux | 4th century |
| Maximus of Jerusalem | 4th century |
| Maximus of Rome | 3rd century |
| Maximus of Salzburg | 5th century |
| Maximus of Turin | 5th century |
| Saint Medardus | 5th century |
| Mel | 5th century |
| Melania the Elder | 410 |
| Melania the Younger | 439 |
| Meletius of Antioch | 4th century |
| Melito of Sardis | 2nd century |
| Mellonius | 4th century |
| Menas | 309 |
| Menelphalus of Aix | 430 |
| Menodora, Metrodora, and Nymphodora | 4th century |
| Mercurialis of Forlì | 4th century |
| Mercurius | 3rd century |
| Meriasek | 5th century |
| Mesrob | 5th century |
| Methodius of Olympus | 4th century |
| Metrophanes of Byzantium | 4th century |
| Miltiades | 314 |
| Mirian III of Iberia | 4th century |
| Mitre | 5th century |
| Mocius | 3rd century |
| Modest (Bishop of Trier) | 5th century |
| Monica | 4th century |
| Monica of Hippo | 387 |
| Moses (bishop of the Arabs) | 4th century |
| Moses | Bronze Age |
| Moses the Black | 5th century |
| Moura | 3rd century |
| Munditia | 4th century |
| Myrrhbearers | 1st century |
| Nabor and Felix | 4th century |
| Namatius | 5th century |
| Nana of Iberia | 4th century |
| Narcissus of Athens | 1st century |
| Narcissus of Jerusalem | c. 222 |
| Narcissus, Argeus, and Marcellinus | 4th century |
| Narnus | 4th century |
| Naucratius | 4th century |
| Nectarius of Constantinople | 4th century |
| Nereus | 1st century |
| Nerses I | 4th century |
| Nestor of Magydos | 3rd century |
| Nestor of Thessaloniki | 3rd century |
| Nicarete | 5th century |
| Nicasius of Dijon | 4th century |
| Nicasius of Rheims | 5th century |
| Nicasius, Quirinus, Scubiculus, and Pientia | 3rd century |
| Nicetas of Remesiana | 5th century |
| Nicholas | 4th century |
| Nicholas of Myra | 343 |
| Nicodemus | 1st century |
| Nilus of Sinai | 5th century |
| Nine Saints | 5th century |
| Ninian | 432 |
| Nino Enlightener of Georgia | c. 338 or 340 |
| Nonna of Nazianzus | 374 |
| Novatus | 2nd century |
| Odran | 5th century |
| Olcán | 5th century |
| Oliva of Brescia | 2nd century |
| Onesimus | 1st century |
| Onesiphorus | 1st century |
| Onuphrius | 4th century |
| Optatus | 4th century |
| Orestes of Cappadocia | 4th century |
| Orontius of Lecce | 1st century |
| Otimus | 3rd century |
| Ovidius | 2nd century |
| Pachomius the Great | 348 |
| Pacian | 4th century |
| Palatias and Laurentia | 4th century |
| Palladius of Antioch | 4th century |
| Pambo | 4th century |
| Pammachius | 5th century |
| Pamphilus of Caesarea | 4th century |
| Pancras of Rome | c. 304 |
| Pancras of Taormina | 1st century |
| Pantaenus | 2nd century |
| Pantaleon (Panteleimon) | 303 |
| Paphnutius of Thebes | 4th century |
| Paphnutius the Ascetic | 4th century |
| Papias | 155 |
| Papias of Hierapolis | 2nd century |
| Papulus | 3rd century |
| Paraskevi of Iconium | 3rd century |
| Paraskevi of Rome | 2nd century |
| Paraskevi the Samaritan | c. 54–63 |
| Parrobus of Pottole | 1st century |
| Paternus | 3rd century |
| Paternus of Auch | 2nd century |
| Patiens | 2nd century |
| Patriarch Fravitta of Constantinople | 5th century |
| Patrick | c. 5th century |
| Patroclus of Troyes | 3rd century |
| Paul | 1st century |
| Paul I of Constantinople | 4th century |
| Paul of Narbonne | 3rd century |
| Paul of Tammah | 4th century |
| Paul of Thebes | 345 |
| Paul the Apostle | c. 67 |
| Paul the Simple | 4th century |
| Paula | 404 |
| Paulinus of Nola | 431 |
| Paulinus of Trier | 4th century |
| Pausilypus | 2nd century |
| Pelagia of Tarsus | 4th century |
| Pelagius of Constance | 3rd century |
| Peregrine (martyr) | 2nd century |
| Peregrine of Auxerre | 3rd century |
| Peregrinus, Bishop of Terni | 2nd century |
| Perpetua and her companions | c. 210 |
| Perpetuus | 5th century |
| Peter | c. 64 |
| Peter Chrysologus | 450 |
| Peter II of Alexandria | 4th century |
| Peter of Alexandria | 311 |
| Peter of Rates | 1st century |
| Peter of Sebaste | 391 |
| Peter the Hermit of Galatia | 5th century |
| Peter the Iberian | 5th century |
| Peter, Andrew, Paul, and Denise | 3rd century |
| Petronilla | 1st century |
| Petronius | 5th century |
| Pharmutius | 4th century |
| Philastrius | 4th century |
| Philemon (New Testament person) | 1st century |
| Philemon the actor | 4th century |
| Philetus | 2nd century |
| Philip of Gortyna | 2nd century |
| Philip the Apostle | c. 80 |
| Philip the Evangelist | 1st century |
| Philo and Agathopodes | 2nd century |
| Philologus of Sinope | 1st century |
| Philomena of Rome | c. 4th century |
| Philonella | c. 100 |
| Phlegon of Marathon | 1st century |
| Phocas | 4th century |
| Phocas, Bishop of Sinope | 2nd century |
| Phoebe | 1st or 2nd century |
| Photini of Samaria | 1st century |
| Piatus | 3rd century |
| Pierius | 4th century |
| Pijimi | 4th century |
| Pinytus | 2nd century |
| Pionius | 3rd century |
| Pishoy | 5th century |
| Pistis (Faith) | 2nd century |
| Pius I | 2nd century |
| Placidus (martyr) | 4th century |
| Plautilla | 1st century |
| Poimen | 5th century |
| Pollio | 3rd century |
| Polycarp of Smyrna | c. 155 |
| Polycrates of Ephesus | 2nd century |
| Polyeuctus | 3rd century |
| Polyxena | 1st century ? |
| Pontian | 235 |
| Pontianus (martyr) | 2nd century |
| Pontius Pilate | 1st century |
| Pope Linus | c. 79 |
| Porphyry of Gaza | 420 |
| Possidius | 5th century |
| Pothinus | 2nd century |
| Praxedes | 2nd century |
| Primus and Felician | 3rd century |
| Prisca | 1st century |
| Priscilla and Aquila | 1st century |
| Priscus (saint) | 3rd century |
| Proclus of Constantinople | 5th century |
| Procopius of Scythopolis | 4th century |
| Proculus | 320 |
| Proculus of Bologna | 4th century |
| Proculus of Pozzuoli | 4th century |
| Prosdocimus | 1st century |
| Prosper of Reggio | 5th century |
| Proterius of Alexandria | 5th century |
| Ptolemaeus and Lucius | 2nd century |
| Publius | 2nd century |
| Pudentiana | 2nd century |
| Pulcheria | 5th century |
| Pusai | 4th century |
| Quadratus (martyr) | 4th century |
| Quadratus of Athens | 2nd century |
| Quartus of Berytus | 1st century |
| Quentin | 287 |
| Quintus of Phrygia | 285 |
| Quiricus | 304 |
| Quirinus of Neuss | 2nd century |
| Quirinus of Rome | 303 |
| Quirinus of Sescia | 4th century |
| Quiteria | 2nd century |
| Quodvultdeus | c. 450 |
| Rais | 4th century |
| Rajden the First-Martyr | 5th century |
| Rasyphus and Ravennus | 5th century |
| Regina | 286 |
| Reginos | 4th century |
| Regulus | 4th century |
| Renatus | 5th century |
| Reparata | 3rd century |
| Restituta | 3rd century |
| Rhipsime | 3rd century |
| Romanus of Blaye | 4th century |
| Romanus of Caesarea | 4th century |
| Romanus of Condat | 5th century |
| Romanus of Samosata | 3rd century |
| Romanus of Subiaco | 3rd century |
| Romanus Ostiarius | 3rd century |
| Romedius | 4th century |
| Romulus (martyr) | 2nd century |
| Romulus of Fiesole | 4th century |
| Rufina and Secunda | 3rd century |
| Rufinus of Assisi | 3rd century ? |
| Rufus and Carpophorus | 3rd or 4th century |
| Rufus and Zosimus | 2nd century |
| Rufus of Metz | 4th century |
| Rufus of Thebes | 1st century |
| Rusticus of Clermont | 5th century |
| Rusticus of Narbonne | 5th century |
| Sabbas Stratelates | 3rd century |
| Sabbas the Goth | 373 |
| Sabina | 2nd century |
| Sabinian of Troyes | 3rd century |
| Sabinus | 4th century |
| Sabinus of Hermopolis | 3rd century |
| Sagar of Laodicea | 2nd century |
| Saizana | 4th century |
| Salomon of Cornwall | 5th century |
| Salonius | 5th century |
| Santi Quattro Coronati | 4th century |
| Sapor of Bet-Nicator | 4th century |
| Sarah Kali | 1st century |
| Sarah of the Desert | 5th century |
| Sarah the Martyr | c. 304 |
| Sarbel and Barbe | 2nd century |
| Saturnin | 3rd century |
| Saturninus of Cagliari | 4th century |
| Satyrus of Arezzo | 4th century |
| Satyrus of Milan | 4th century |
| Savina of Milan | 4th century |
| Savinian and Potentian | 4th century |
| Scillitan Martyrs | 2nd century |
| Seachnaill | 5th century |
| Sebastian | 287 |
| Secundian, Marcellian and Verian | 3rd century |
| Secundus of Asti | 2nd century |
| Sennen | 3rd century |
| Serapia | 2nd century |
| Serapion of Antioch | 211 |
| Serapion Scholasticus | c. 350 |
| Serenus the Gardener | 4th century |
| Sergius | c. 303 |
| Sergius of Cappadocia | 4th century |
| Servandus and Cermanus | 4th century |
| Servatius | c. 384 |
| Severian of Scythopolis | 5th century |
| Severin of Cologne | 4th century |
| Severinus of Noricum | 5th century |
| Severinus, Exuperius, and Felician | 2nd century |
| Severus of Barcelona | 4th century |
| Severus of Naples | 5th century |
| Severus of Vienne | 5th century |
| Shenouda the Archimandrite | 5th century |
| Shushanik | 5th century |
| Sidonius Apollinaris | 5th century |
| Silas | 50 |
| Silvanus of the Seventy | 1st century |
| Simeon Barsabae | 4th century |
| Simeon of Jerusalem | 2nd century |
| Simeon Stylites | 5th century |
| Simeon the Holy Fool | 4th century |
| Simeon the Righteous | c. 1st century |
| Simon of Bet-Titta | 5th century |
| Simon of Cyrene | 1st century |
| Simon the Zealot | 1st century |
| Simplician | 4th century |
| Simplicius | 302 or 303 |
| Simplicius | 5th century |
| Simplicius, Constantius and Victorinus | 2nd century |
| Siricius | 399 |
| Sixtus I | 126 or 128 |
| Sixtus II | 258 |
| Sixtus III | 440 |
| Solutor | 3rd century |
| Sophia (Wisdom) | 2nd century ? |
| Sophia of Rome | 4th century |
| Sophia the Martyr | 2nd century |
| Sosipater of Iconium | 1st century |
| Sossius | 3rd century |
| Sosthenes | 1st century |
| Soter | c. 174 |
| Speusippus, Eleusippus and Melapsippus | 2nd century |
| Spyridon of Trimythous | 348 |
| Stachys the Apostle | 1st century |
| Stephanie | 2nd century |
| Stephen | c. 35 |
| Stephen I | 257 |
| Susanna | 1st century |
| Sylvester I | 335 |
| Symphorian and Timotheus | 2nd & 4th century |
| Symphorosa | 2nd century |
| Syrus of Genoa | 4th century |
| Syrus of Pavia | 1st century |
| Tallanus | 5th century |
| Tarcisius | 3rd century |
| Tassac | 5th century |
| Tatiana of Rome | c. 226–235 |
| Taurinus | 5th century |
| Tegulus | 3rd century |
| Telemachus | 5th century |
| Telesphorus | c. 137 |
| Ten thousand martyrs | 4th century |
| Terentian | 2nd century |
| Terenzio of Pesaro | c. 250 |
| Tertius of Iconium | 1st century |
| Thalassius of Syria | 5th century |
| Thamel (martyr) | 2nd century |
| Theban Legion | 3rd century |
| Thecla of Iconium | c. 1st century |
| Theoclia | 4th century |
| Theodora (Roman martyr) | 2nd century |
| Theodora and Didymus | 3rd or 4th century |
| Theodore and Pausilippus | 2nd century |
| Theodore of Amasea | 306 |
| Theodore of Egypt | 5th century |
| Theodore Stratelates | 4th century |
| Theodoret of Antioch | 4th century |
| Theodorus of Tabennese | 4th century |
| Theodotus of Ancyra (bishop) | 5th century |
| Theodotus of Ancyra (martyr) | 4th century |
| Theonistus | 5th century |
| Theophilus of Alexandria | 5th century |
| Theophilus of Antioch | 2nd century |
| Theophilus, bishop of Caesarea | 2nd century |
| Theosebia | 4th century |
| Theotimos | 5th century |
| Thomas the Apostle | c. 72 |
| Thraseas | 2nd century |
| Thyrsus | 3rd century |
| Saint Tiburtius | 3rd century |
| Saint Susanna | 3rd century |
| Timothy I of Alexandria | 4th century |
| Timothy the Apostle | c. 80 |
| Tiridates III of Armenia | 4th century |
| Titus (Companion of Paul) | c. 107 |
| Torquatus of Acci | 1st century |
| Trifon | 3rd century |
| Trofimena | 3rd century |
| Trophimus of Arles | 3rd century |
| Tryphon | c. 248 |
| Turibius of Astorga | 5th century |
| Tychicus | 1st century |
| Tychicus of Chalcedon | 1st century |
| Tydfil | 5th century |
| Typasius | 4th century |
| Urban I | 230 |
| Urban of Langres | 4th century |
| Urban of Macedonia | 1st century |
| Urpasian | 2nd century |
| Urpasianus | 4th century |
| Ursicinus of Brescia | 347 |
| Ursicinus of Ravenna | c. 67 |
| Ursinus of Bourges | 3rd century |
| Ursula | 383? |
| Ursus of Solothurn | 3rd century |
| Valentine | 3rd century |
| Valerian of Abbenza | 5th century |
| Valerius and Rufinus | 3rd century |
| Valerius of Saragossa | 4th century |
| Valerius of Trèves | 4th century |
| Vartan Mamigonian | 451 |
| Varus | 4th century |
| Vasilissa, Martyr | 4th century |
| Venantius of Camerino | 3rd century |
| Venerius of Milan | 5th century |
| Veronica | 1st century ? |
| Viator of Bergamo | 4th century |
| Viator of Lyons | 4th century |
| Vibiana | 3rd century |
| Victor I | 199 |
| Victor Maurus | 3rd or 4th century |
| Victor of Damascus | 2nd century |
| Victor of Marseilles | 3rd century |
| Victor of Turin | 5th century |
| Victoria | 304 |
| Victoria of Albitina | 4th century |
| Victoria, Anatolia, and Audax | 3rd or 4th century |
| Victorian, Frumentius and Companions | 5th century |
| Victoricus, Fuscian, and Gentian | 3rd century |
| Victorinus of Pettau | 4th century |
| Victricius | 5th century |
| Vigilius of Trent | 5th century |
| Viktor of Xanten | 3rd century |
| Vincenca | 3rd century |
| Vincent of Lérins | 445 |
| Vincent of Saragossa | 304 |
| Vincent, Orontius, and Victor | 4th century |
| Vitalis and Agricola | 4th century |
| Vitus | 303 |
| Volusianus of Tours | 5th century |
| Wilgefortis of Lusitania | 2nd century |
| Xanthippe | 1st century ? |
| Xenia the Righteous of Rome | 5th century |
| Zacchaeus of Jerusalem | 2nd century |
| Zachary, Bishop of Vienne | 2nd century |
| Zamudas of Jerusalem | 3rd century |
| Zanitas and Lazarus of Persia | 4th century |
| Zechariah | 1st century |
| Zenaida | 1st century |
| Zeno of Verona | 371 or 380 |
| Zeno the Hermit | 5th century |
| Zenobius of Florence | 417 |
| Zephyrinus | 217 |
| Zoe of Rome | c. 286 |
| Zoilus | 304 |
| Zosimus (martyr) | 2nd century |
| Zosimus | 418 |
| Zosimus the Hermit | 3rd century |

== See also ==
- Calendar of saints
- Roman Martyrology
- Saint symbolism
- List of Servants of God
