= Abundius (given name) =

Abundius (fl. 451 – 469) was a saint and bishop of Como, Italy.

Abundius is also the name of:

- Abundius and Irenaeus (died 258), saints and martyrs
- Abundius and Abundantius (died 304), saints martyred north of Rome in the Diocletian persecution
- Abundius of Umbria (died 303), saint martyred north of Rome in the Diocletian persecution
- Abundius the Sacristan (died 564), saint and sacristan of St. Peter's Basilica
- Abundius of Córdoba (died 854), 9th century priest, martyr, and saint of Córdoba, Spain
- Abundius of Pietra Montecorvina, saint and martyr of Pietramontecorvino in Apulia
- Abundius of Palestrina, Italian saint

== See also ==
- Saint Abundantia (died 804), Christian saint
- Abundantius (disambiguation), the name of several Christian saints
