= 345 =

345 in various calendars
Gregorian calendar	345; CCCXLV
Ab urbe condita	1098
Assyrian calendar	5095
Balinese saka calendar	266–267
Bengali calendar	−249 – −248
Berber calendar	1295
Buddhist calendar	889
Burmese calendar	−293
Byzantine calendar	5853–5854
Chinese calendar	甲辰年 (Wood Dragon); 3042 or 2835 — to — 乙巳年 (Wood Snake); 3043 or 2836
Coptic calendar	61–62
Discordian calendar	1511
Ethiopian calendar	337–338
Hebrew calendar	4105–4106
- Hindu calendars
Vikram Samvat	401–402
Shaka Samvat	266–267
Kali Yuga	3445–3446
Holocene calendar	10345
Iranian calendar	277 BP – 276 BP
Islamic calendar	286 BH – 285 BH
Javanese calendar	226–227
Julian calendar	345; CCCXLV
Korean calendar	2678
Minguo calendar	1567 before ROC 民前1567年
Nanakshahi calendar	−1123
Seleucid era	656/657 AG
Thai solar calendar	887–888
Tibetan calendar	阳木龙年 (male Wood-Dragon); 471 or 90 or −682 — to — 阴木蛇年 (female Wood-Snake); 472 or 91 or −681

The Year 345 (CCCXLV) was a common year starting on Tuesday of the Julian calendar. At the time, it was known as the Year of the Consulship of Amantius and Albinus (or, less frequently, year 1098 Ab urbe condita). The denomination 345 for this year has been used ever since the early medieval period, when the Anno Domini calendar era became the prevalent method in Europe for naming years.

== Events ==
=== By place ===
==== India ====
- Merchant Knai Thomman and 400 followers visit the Malabar Coast in Kerala (India), and assist the church there.
- The Kadamba Dynasty is founded by Mayurasharma.

==== Italy ====
- Constans orders the Basilica di Santa Tecla to be constructed in Milan.

== Births ==
- Evagrius Ponticus, Christian monk and ascetic (d. 399)
- Afranius Syagrius, Roman politician and administrator
- Quintus Aurelius Symmachus, Roman consul and intellectual (d. 402)
- Tyrannius of Aquileia, historian and theologian (approximate date)

== Deaths ==
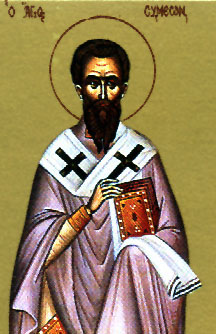
Saint Shemon Bar Sabbae

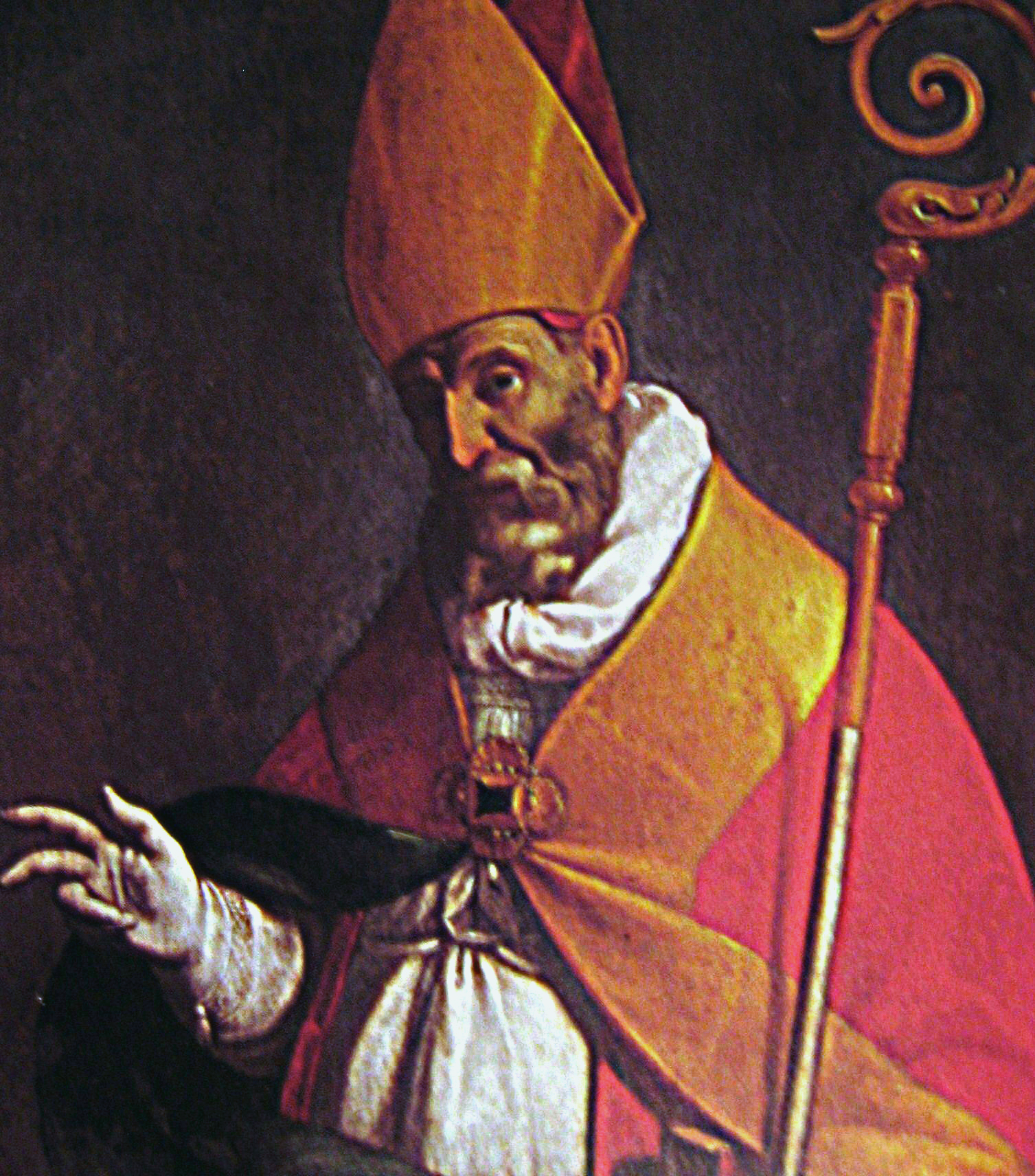
Saint Narnus

- February 4 – Abraham of Arbela, Persian bishop and martyr (approximate date)
- April 6
  - Abdecalas – Persian Orthodox priest and saint
  - Shemon Bar Sabbae – Persian Orthodox priest and saint
- June 16 – Patriarch Gregory of Cappadocia
- August 27 – Narnus, Roman Catholic bishop and saint
- November 20 – Abiatha, Hathes and Mamlacha, Syrian Orthodox priests, virgins, martyrs and saints

=== Date unknown ===
- Abdisho, member of the Church of the East
- Aphrahat, Syrian Orthodox priest and saint
- Stephen I of Antioch, Byzantine bishop and saint
