= Abibus =

Abibus is the name of several people. These include:

== Saints ==
- Abibus of Edessa, a Christian martyr at Edessa, Syria
- Abibus of Nekressi, bishop of Nekressi and one of the 13 Syrian apostles of Georgia
- Abibus of Alexandria, a deacon and martyr; see Faustus, Abibus and Dionysius of Alexandria
- Abibus of Hermopolis, an alternate name of Sabinus of Hermopolis
- Abibus of Persia, a companion in martyrdom of Zanitas and Lazarus of Persia
- Abibus of Samosata, a Christian martyr in 297
- Abibus of Samosata, another man by the same name, a companion in martyrdom of Romanus of Samosata
