= Chronological list of Saints in the 1st century =

This is a list of people, who died just prior to the Massacre of the Innocents (the slaughter by Herod of Judea of male babies under two years old in an effort to eliminate the newborn King of the Jews) or during the 1st century, who have received recognition from the Catholic Church as saints (through canonization).

== Table ==
Name	Birth	Birthplace	Death	Place of Death	Notes
Joachim	1st century BC	Unknown	Unknown	Unknown	Father of Virgin Mary
Anne	1st century BC	Unknown	Unknown	Unknown	Mother of Virgin Mary
The Holy Innocents	perhaps from 8 BC to 4 BC	Bethlehem	perhaps from 6 BC to 4 BC	Bethlehem	Killed by Herod
Simeon	1st century BC		Unknown	Jerusalem	Witness of Jesus' Presentation
Anna the Prophetess	perhaps around 84BC		Unknown	Jerusalem	Witness of Jesus' Presentation
Joseph		Bethlehem	Unknown	Nazareth	Husband of the Blessed Virgin Mary
Virgin Mary			Unknown	Unknown, possibly Ephesus	Mother of Jesus Christ
Longinus			Unknown	Unknown	Roman soldier who plunged his spear in Jesus' side
John the Baptist			31–36	Machaerus	
Penitent Thief			33	Golgotha, Jerusalem	
Stephen			36	Jerusalem	The first Christian Martyr
Nicodemus			Unknown	Unknown	elder of Israel, believed in Jesus
Pancras of Taormina			40	Sicily	
James the Greater		Bethsaida, Galilee	44	Judea	Apostle
Barnabas		Cyprus	60	Salamis, Cyprus	Apostle
Pudens			60	Rome	
Andrew		Bethsaida, Galilee	61	Patras, Greece	Apostle
James the Just		Nazareth, Galilee	62	Jerusalem, Judea	Apostle, first Bishop of Jerusalem
Clateus			64		Bishop of Brescia
Evodius			64	Antioch, Syria	Bishop of Antioch
First Martyrs of the Church of Rome			64	Rome	
Basilissa and Anastasia		Rome	65	Rome	
Jude the Apostle			65	Lebanon	Apostle
Simon the Zealot			65	Roman Britain	Apostle
Torpes of Pisa		Pisa	65	Pisa	
Evellius			66	Pisa	
Paulinus of Antioch		Antioch, Syria	67		legendary Bishop of Lucca
Matthew the Evangelist			67	Ethiopia	Apostle
Peter		Bethsaida, Galilee	67	Rome	Apostle, first Pope and Bishop of Rome
Paul the Apostle		Tarsus	67	Rome	Apostle
Plautilla		Rome	67		
Processus and Martinian			67		
Ursicinus		Ravenna	67		
Mark the Evangelist		Libya	68	Alexandria, Egypt	Evangelist
Philemon and Apphia			70	Colossae, Phrygia	
Bartholomew		Judea	72	Albanopolis, Armenia	Apostle
Thomas the Apostle			74	Mylapur, India	Apostle
Pope Linus		Tuscany	76	Rome	Pope
Nicanor the Deacon			76		
Mary Magdalene		Magdala	77	Ephesus, Asia Minor	
Marcella		Bethany	Unknown	Sainte-Baume, Viennensis	
Candida the Elder		Naples	78	Naples	
Aspren		Naples	79	Naples	Bishop of Naples
Martha		Palestine	80	Tarascon, Gaul	
Matthias		Judea	80	Jerusalem	Apostle
Philip		Bethsaida, Galilee	80	Hierapolis	Apostle
Onesiphorus			81		
Anianus of Alexandria			82	Alexandria, Egypt	Bishop of Alexandria
Luke the Evangelist		Antioch, Syria	84	Boeotia, Greece	Evangelist
Birillus		Antioch, Syria	90		Bishop of Catania
Felicula			90		
Petronilla			90		
Nicomedes		Rome	90		
Pope Anacletus			91	Rome	Pope
Antipas of Pergamum			92	Pergamon, Asia Minor	
Pope Avilius of Alexandria			95		Bishop of Alexandria
Onesimus			95	Rome	
Flavius Clement			96		
Titus			96	Gortyn, Crete	Bishop of Crete
Timothy			97	Ephesus, Asia Minor	Bishop of Ephesus
Parmenas			98	Philippi, Macedonia	
Prisca			98		
Pope Clement I		Rome	100	Chersonesus, Taurica, Bosporan Kingdom	Pope
John the Apostle		Bethsaida, Galilee	100	Ephesus, Asia Minor	Apostle
Nereus, Achilleus and Domitilla			100		
Prosdocimus		Antioch, Asia Minor	100		

== See also ==
- Christianity in the 1st century
- Twelve Apostles
