= September 23 (Eastern Orthodox liturgics) =

Day in the Eastern Orthodox liturgical calendar

Eastern Orthodox liturgical calendar
September 22	September 23	September 24
September 23 O.S. ≍ October 6 N.S. September 23 N.S ≍ September 10 O.S.

An Eastern Orthodox cross

September 23 in Eastern Orthodox liturgical calendars is a feast day and a day of commemoration of saints and martyrs. Although some Orthodox churches use the Revised Julian Calendar and others use the traditional Julian calendar, the fixed commemorations for their respective September 23 are broadly the same, no matter which calendar is used. (Note: Despite the dates being the same, the days to which they refer typically differ by 13 days. The notation Old Style or O.S. is sometimes used to indicate a date in the traditional Julian Calendar (the "Old Calendar"). The notation New Style or N.S. indicates a date in the Revised Julian calendar (the "New Calendar").)

== Feasts ==
- The Conception of the Glorious Prophet, Forerunner, and Baptist John.

== Saints ==
- Saints Xanthippe and Polyxena, of Spain, disciples of the Apostles (109) (Note: Name days celebrated today include: Xanthippi, Xanthipos (Ξανθίππη); Polyxena, Polyxene, Polyxeni, Xene, Xeni (Πολυξένη).)
- Virgin-martyr Irais (Rhais, Raissa) of Alexandria (308) (see also: September 5)
- Martyrs Andrew and John, and his sons Peter and Antoninus, of Syracuse, martyred in Africa (9th century) (Note: These saints were deported from Syracuse to North Africa by the Saracens, at that time masters of Sicily. There they were subjected to savage tortures and put to death.)

== Pre-Schism Western saints ==
- Saint Linus, the first Pope of Rome (c. 79) (Note: A disciple of the Apostle Paul, he was one of the Seventy and is mentioned in 2 Timothy 4,21. He was Pope for twelve years (67-79) and is venerated as a martyr.) (Note: "AT Rome, St. Linus, pope and martyr, who governed the Roman church next after the blessed apostle Peter. He was crowned with martyrdom, and buried on the Vatican hill beside the same apostle.") (In the East: January 4 and November 5 )
- Saint Paternus (Pair), Bishop of Avranches (c. 563) (Note: Born in Poitiers in France, he became a monk at Ansion and later a hermit near Coutances. Eventually he became Bishop of Avranches.) (Note: "In the diocese of Coutances, St. Paternus, bishop and martyr.")
- Saint Constantius, sacristan of the ancient church of St Stephen in Ancona in Italy (6th century) (Note: "At Ancona, St. Constantius, sacristan of the Church, renowned for the gift of miracles.")
- Saint Adomnán, Abbot of Iona, biographer of Saint Columba (704)
- Saint Cissa of Crowland, a disciple of St Guthlac at Crowland in England (early 8th century)

== Post-Schism Orthodox saints ==
- New Martyr Nicholas the Grocer ("O Pantopolis"), at Constantinople (1672) (Note: Certain Synaxaria list his feast day on December 23 as well.)
- New Martyr John of Konitsa, Epirus, by beheading (1814)
- New Hieromartyr Gregory (Kalamaras), Metropolitan of Argos and Nauplion, Ethnomartyr (1821)

=== New martyrs and confessors ===
- New Hieromartyr John Pankratovich, Priest (1937)
- New Hieromartyr Arsenius, Archimandrite (1937)

== Other commemorations ==
- Icon of the Mother of God of Slovenka (Solvenskaya) (1635)
- Repose of Abbess Eupraxia of Old Ladoga Convent (1823)
- Repose of Hieroschemamonk Jerome of Solovki (1847)
- Glorification (1977) of St. Innocent, Metropolitan of Moscow, Enlightener of Alaska and Siberia (1879)
- Myrrh-streaming Iveron Icon of the Theotokos "Hawaiian" (2007) (Note: The Miracle-working Hawaiian Myrrh-streaming Iveron Icon of the Theotokos appeared inexplicably giving myrrh in the home of a pious Orthodox Christian couple on Sep. 23 / Oct 6, 2007, in Honolulu, Hawaii. Since its manifestation, it has been recognized by the Synod of Bishops of the Russian Orthodox Church Outside Russia as miraculous and genuine. This icon is well known to have cured many pious individuals of cancer, blindness, kidney and liver diseases, chronic pain, and demonic possession. It currently resides at the Russian Orthodox Church in Honolulu, but frequently travels throughout the world bringing forth healings and cures to all who have shown faith and love to Our Lord Jesus Christ and His Most holy Mother.)

== Icon gallery ==
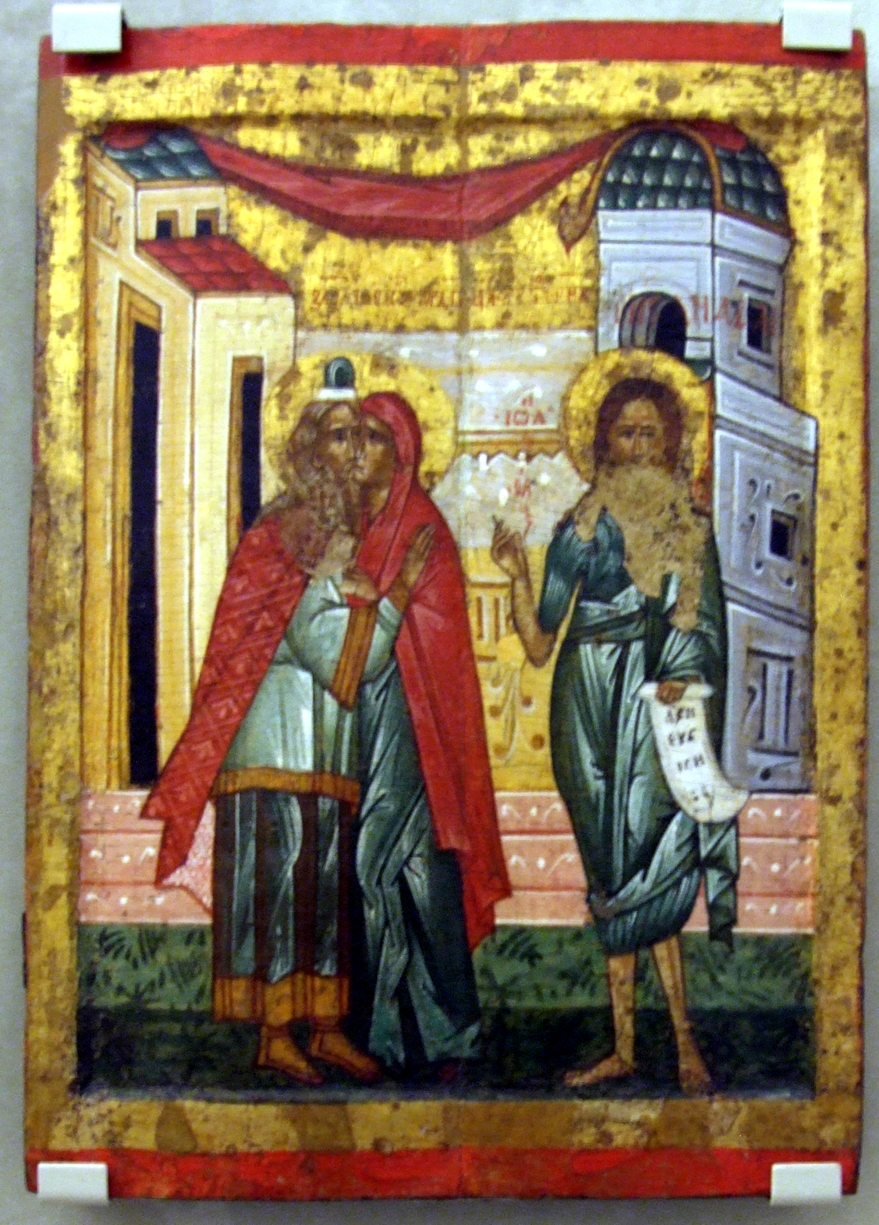
Icon of the Conception of the Glorious Prophet, Forerunner, and Baptist John.

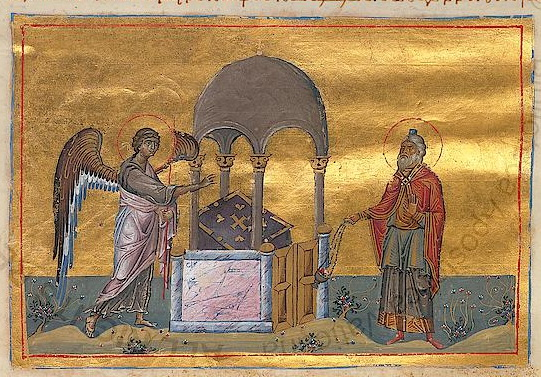
Annunciation to Zachariah.
(Menologion of Basil II, 10th century).

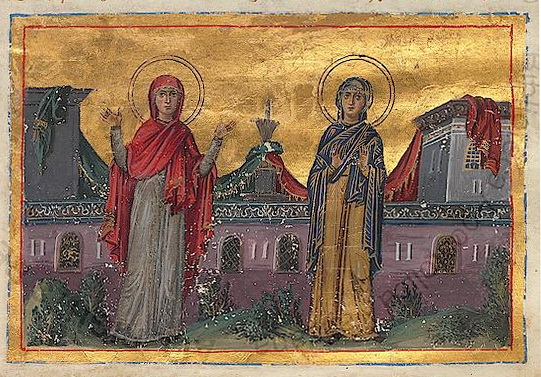
Saints Xanthippe and Polyxena, of Spain.
(Menologion of Basil II, 10th century).

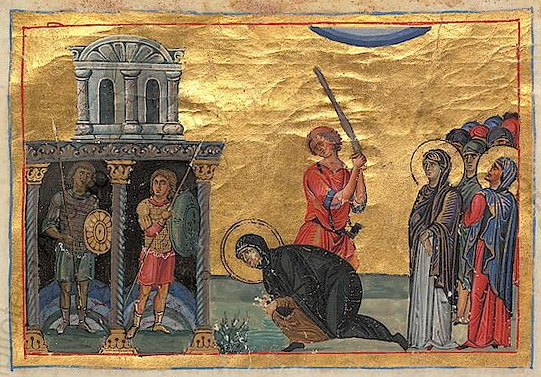
Virgin-martyr Irais (Rhais, Raissa) of Alexandria.
(Menologion of Basil II, 10th century).

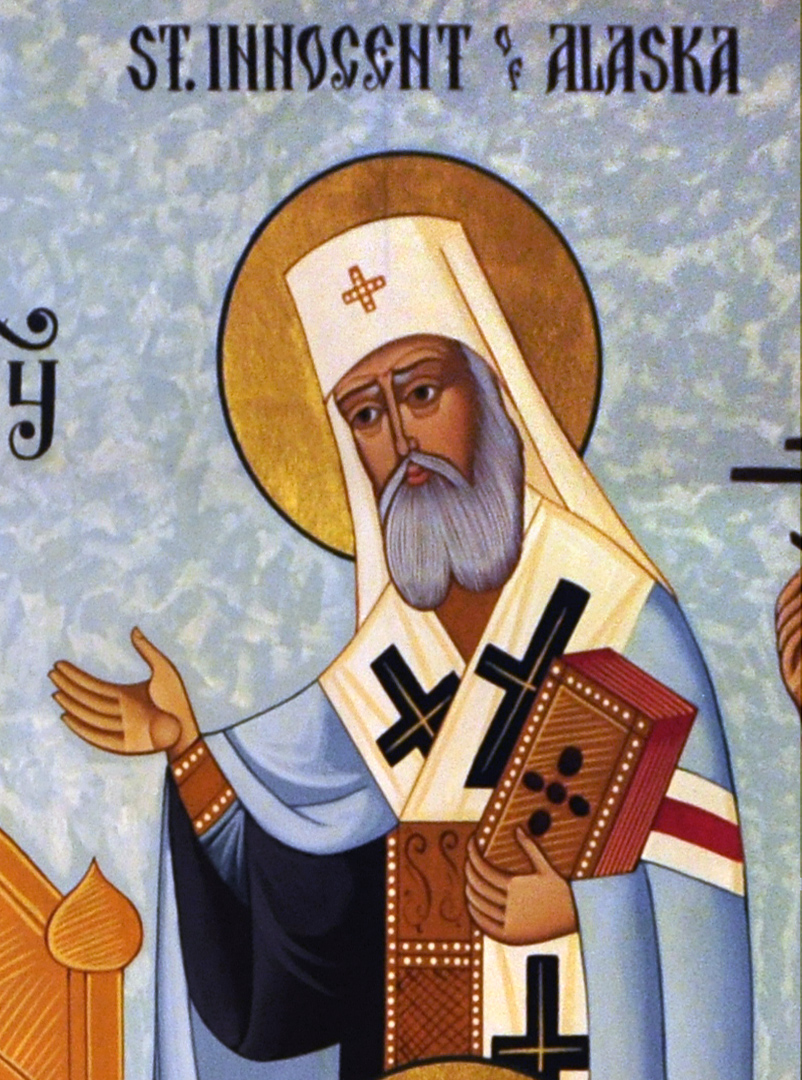
St. Innocent, Metropolitan of Moscow, Enlightener of Alaska and Siberia.

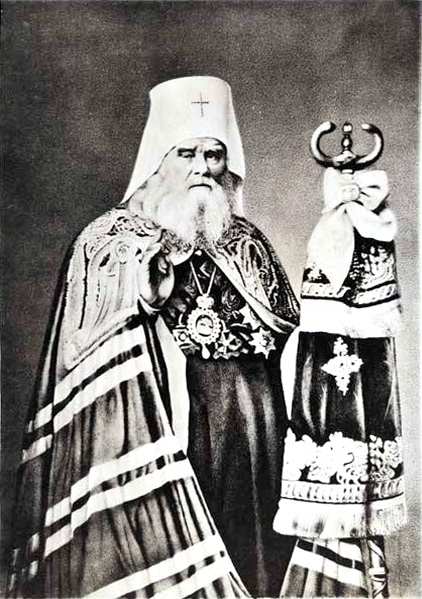
St. Innocent, Metropolitan of Moscow, Enlightener of Alaska and Siberia.

== Sources ==
- September 23/October 6. Orthodox Calendar (PRAVOSLAVIE.RU).
- October 6 / September 23. HOLY TRINITY RUSSIAN ORTHODOX CHURCH (A parish of the Patriarchate of Moscow).
- September 23. OCA - The Lives of the Saints.
- The Autonomous Orthodox Metropolia of Western Europe and the Americas (ROCOR). St. Hilarion Calendar of Saints for the year of our Lord 2004. St. Hilarion Press (Austin, TX). p. 71.
- The Twenty-Third Day of the Month of September. Orthodoxy in China.
- September 23. Latin Saints of the Orthodox Patriarchate of Rome.
- The Roman Martyrology. Transl. by the Archbishop of Baltimore. Last Edition, According to the Copy Printed at Rome in 1914. Revised Edition, with the Imprimatur of His Eminence Cardinal Gibbons. Baltimore: John Murphy Company, 1916. p. 294.
- Rev. Richard Stanton. A Menology of England and Wales, or, Brief Memorials of the Ancient British and English Saints Arranged According to the Calendar, Together with the Martyrs of the 16th and 17th Centuries. London: Burns & Oates, 1892. pp. 455–456.

Greek Sources

- Great Synaxaristes: (in Greek) 23 ΣΕΠΤΕΜΒΡΙΟΥ. ΜΕΓΑΣ ΣΥΝΑΞΑΡΙΣΤΗΣ.
- (in Greek) Συναξαριστής. 23 Σεπτεμβρίου. ECCLESIA.GR. (H ΕΚΚΛΗΣΙΑ ΤΗΣ ΕΛΛΑΔΟΣ).
- (in Greek) 23/09/2016. Ορθόδοξος Συναξαριστής.

Russian Sources

- (in Russian) 6 октября (23 сентября). Православная Энциклопедия под редакцией Патриарха Московского и всея Руси Кирилла (электронная версия). (Orthodox Encyclopedia - Pravenc.ru).
- (in Russian) 23 сентября по старому стилю / 6 октября по новому стилю. Русская Православная Церковь - Православный церковный календарь на 2016 год.
