= Abundantius =

Abundantius may refer to

- Abundantius (consul), the Roman consul in 393
- Abundantius of Putignano, Christian saint. died as a martyr. His relics are venerated at Putignano. His feast day is celebrated on March 22.
- Abundantius of Fiesole, Christian saint, was a deacon and martyr - see Abundius and Abundantius.
- Abundantius of Ossuna, Christian saint, became a martyr with Leo and Donatus.

== See also ==
- Saint Abundantia (died 804), Christian saint
- Abundius (disambiguation), the name of several Christian saints
