= Barhadbshabba =

Barhadbshabba may refer to:

- Barhadbshabba (martyr of Erbil) (died 355), deacon
- Barhadbshabba (died 367), priest and martyred companion of Abda and Abdisho
- Barhadbshabba (died 367), deacon and martyred companion of Abda and Abdisho
- Barhadbshabba of Qartmin (5th century), healing saint mentioned in the Martyrology of Rabban Sliba
- Barhadbshabba Arbaya (late 6th or early 7th century), historian of the Church of the East
- Barhadbshabba of Hulwan (late 6th or early 7th century), bishop of the Church of the East, possibly identical with prec.
