= July 14 (Eastern Orthodox liturgics) =

Day in the Eastern Orthodox liturgical calendar

Eastern Orthodox liturgical calendar
July 13	July 14	July 15
July 14 O.S. ≍ July 27 N.S. July 14 N.S ≍ July 1 O.S.

An Eastern Orthodox cross

July 14 in Eastern Orthodox liturgical calendars is a feast day and a day of commemoration of saints and martyrs. Although some Orthodox churches use the Revised Julian Calendar and others use the traditional Julian calendar, the fixed commemorations for their respective July 14 are broadly the same, no matter which calendar is used. (Note: Despite the dates being the same, the days to which they refer typically differ by 13 days. The notation Old Style or O.S. is sometimes used to indicate a date in the traditional Julian Calendar (the "Old Calendar"). The notation New Style or N.S. indicates a date in the Revised Julian calendar (the "New Calendar").)

== Saints ==
- Apostle Aquila of the Seventy (1st century), and St. Priscilla (1st century) (see also: February 13, July 8)
- Martyr Justus, a soldier martyred in Rome (1st century) (Note: "At Rome, St. Justus, soldier under the tribune Claudius. A miraculous cross appearing to him, he believed in Christ, was baptized, and bestowed his goods on the poor. Arrested afterwards by the prefect Magnetius, he was scourged, had a heated helmet put on his head, and was thrown into the fire, but without injury even to a hair of his head, Finally, he yielded up his soul in the confession of the Lord.")
- Saint Heraclius, Patriarch of Alexandria, first called by the term "Pope" (246) (Note: "At Alexandria, St. Heraclas, bishop, whose fame was so great that the historian Africanus repaired to Alexandria to see him, as he himself testifies.")
- Martyr Heraclius, clubbed to death.
- Saint Onesimus of Magnesia, Monk and Wonderworker of Caesarea in Palestine (c. 284-305)
- Martyrs Aquila and Hilary, by stoning.
- Martyr Peter the New, Bishop of Crete. (Note: According to some codices, he was a Bishop of Crete.)
- Venerable Ellius (Hellius) of Egypt (4th century)
- Saint Joseph the Confessor (Joseph I the Studite), Archbishop of Thessalonica (832)
- New Martyr John of Merv, Turkmenistan (early 11th century) (Note: "Fr. Touma Bitar tells us in his Forgotten Saints that that according to the Muslim scholar Al-Biruni (d. 1048), the calendar used by the Orthodox in Khwarizm (that is, eastern Persia) commemorated on July 14 a martyr named John from Merv in modern-day Turkmenistan. He was killed by the Muslims for his faith in Christ in the first part of the 11th century.")

== Pre-Schism Western saints ==
- Saint Felix of Como, the first Bishop of Como in Italy, he was a friend of St Ambrose (c. 390)
- Saint Idus of Leinster, baptised by St Patrick, he became Bishop of Alt-Fadha in Leinster, Ireland (5th century)
- Saint Optatian (Ottaziano), Bishop of Brescia in Italy c. 451-505 (c. 505)
- Saint Deusdedit of Canterbury, the first Englishman to become Archbishop of Canterbury, succeeding St Honorius in 655 (664)
- Saint Marcellinus (Marchelm, Marculf), Priest, of Utrecht (c. 762) (Note: Born in England, he followed St Willibrord to Holland. Together with St Liafwine he preached the Gospel to the people of Over-Yssel. He reposed at Oldenzeel, but his relics were later taken to Deventer.) (Note: "At Daventry, in Belgium, St. Marcellin, priest and confessor.")
- Saint Libert of Saint-Trond, baptized and educated by St. Rumoldus, he became a Benedictine monk (783)

== Post-Schism Orthodox saints ==
- Saint Stephen of Makhrishche, founder of Makhrishche Monastery in Vologda (1406) (Note: See: (in Russian) Стефан Махрищский. Википедии. (Russian Wikipedia).)
- Venerable Nicodemus of Mt. Athos, spiritual writer (1809) (Note: Name days celebrated today include: Nicodemus, Nikodemos (Νικόδημος).)
- Saint Longinus, Hiero-Schemamonk of Svyatogorsk Monastery (1882)

=== New martyrs and confessors ===
- New Hieromartyr Constantine Bogoyavlensky, Priest (1918) (Note: See: (in Russian) Константин Меркушинский. Википедии. (Russian Wikipedia).)
- New Hieromartyr Nicholas Poretsky, Priest (1933)

== Other commemorations ==
- Uncovering of the relics (1572) of Righteous Virgin Glyceria of Novgorod (1522) (Note: See: (in Russian) Гликерия Новгородская. Википедии. (Russian Wikipedia).)
- Uncovering of the relics (1993) of St. Theophilus, Fool-for-Christ, of Kiev (1853) (Note: See: (in Russian) Феофил (Горенковский). Википедии. (Russian Wikipedia).)

== Icon gallery ==
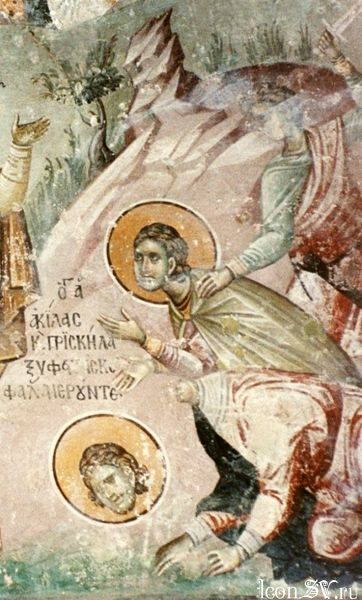
Martyrdom of Apostle Aquila.

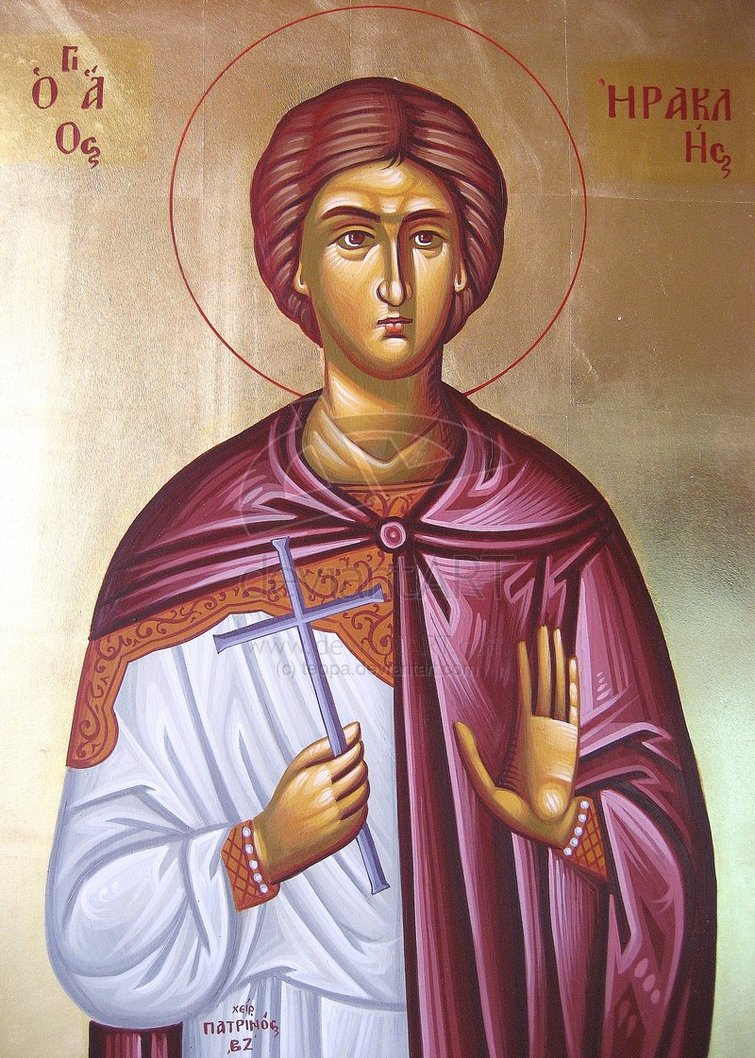
Martyr Heraclius.

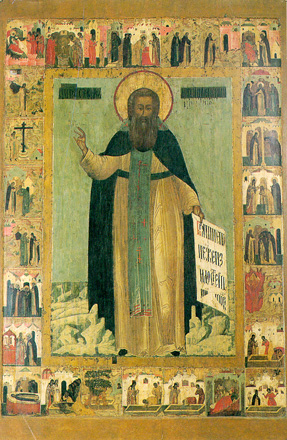
St. Stephen of Makhrishche.

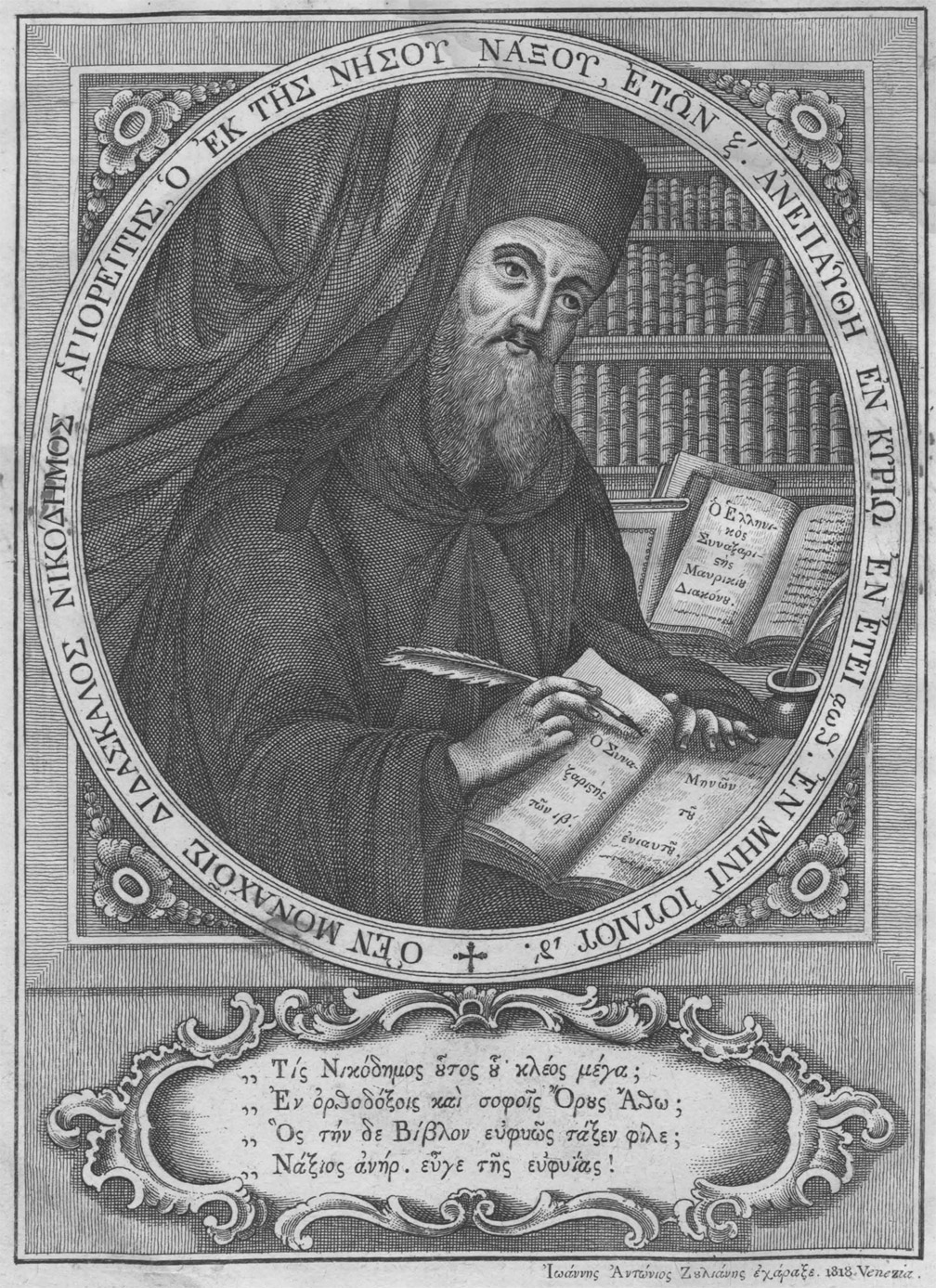
Saint Nicodemus of Mt. Athos, spiritual writer.

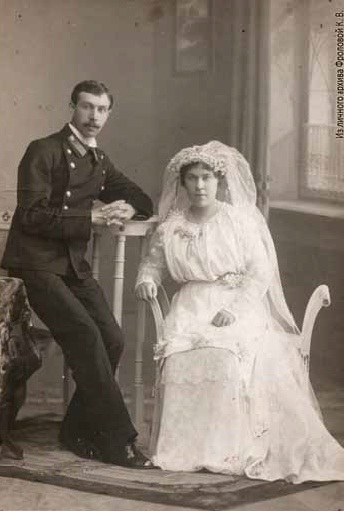
New Hieromartyr Constantine Bogoyavlensky, with his wife Raisa.

== Sources ==
- July 14/July 27. Orthodox Calendar (PRAVOSLAVIE.RU).
- July 27 / July 14. HOLY TRINITY RUSSIAN ORTHODOX CHURCH (A parish of the Patriarchate of Moscow).
- July 14. OCA - The Lives of the Saints.
- July 14. The Year of Our Salvation - Holy Transfiguration Monastery, Brookline, Massachusetts.
- The Autonomous Orthodox Metropolia of Western Europe and the Americas (ROCOR). St. Hilarion Calendar of Saints for the year of our Lord 2004. St. Hilarion Press (Austin, TX). p. 52.
- The Fourteenth Day of the Month of July. Orthodoxy in China.
- July 14. Latin Saints of the Orthodox Patriarchate of Rome.
- The Roman Martyrology. Transl. by the Archbishop of Baltimore. Last Edition, According to the Copy Printed at Rome in 1914. Revised Edition, with the Imprimatur of His Eminence Cardinal Gibbons. Baltimore: John Murphy Company, 1916. pp. 206–207.
- Rev. Richard Stanton. A Menology of England and Wales, or, Brief Memorials of the Ancient British and English Saints Arranged According to the Calendar, Together with the Martyrs of the 16th and 17th Centuries. London: Burns & Oates, 1892. pp. 335–337.

Greek Sources

- Great Synaxaristes: (in Greek) 14 ΙΟΥΛΙΟΥ. ΜΕΓΑΣ ΣΥΝΑΞΑΡΙΣΤΗΣ.
- (in Greek) Συναξαριστής. 14 Ιουλίου. ECCLESIA.GR. (H ΕΚΚΛΗΣΙΑ ΤΗΣ ΕΛΛΑΔΟΣ).
- (in Greek) 14/07/2018. Ορθόδοξος Συναξαριστής.

Russian Sources

- (in Russian) 27 июля (14 июля). Православная Энциклопедия под редакцией Патриарха Московского и всея Руси Кирилла (электронная версия). (Orthodox Encyclopedia - Pravenc.ru).
- (in Russian) 14 июля по старому стилю / 27 июля по новому стилю. СПЖ "Союз православных журналистов". 2018.
- (in Russian) 14 июля (ст.ст.) 27 июля 2014 (нов. ст.). Русская Православная Церковь Отдел внешних церковных связей. (DECR).
