= Saint Zeno =

Saint Zeno may refer to:

- Zeno of Gaza (died c. 362), early Christian martyr
- Zeno of Verona (4th century), theologian
- Zeno the Hermit (4th century?), disciple of Saint Basil
