= John the Hermit =

John the Hermit may refer to:

- John the Hermit (Armenian) (4th century), Armenian saint
- John of Egypt (d. 394)
- Pope John II (III) of Alexandria (d. 516)
- John the Silent (d. c. 558)
- John Xenos (d. c. 1030)
- Juan de Ortega (hermit) (d. 1163)
- John of Tufara, Italian saint (d.1170)
