= Abdisho (died 345) =

Deacon and martyr
- Born: 298
- Died: ca. 345; Masabadan
- Venerated in: Church of the East

Abdisho (Syriac: ʰbhedhišoʰ), a member of the Church of the East, was a deacon and martyr.

He was imprisoned with Bishop Heliodorus of Bet Zabdai in Mesopotamia by order of Shapur II. Following the deaths of bishop Dausa and 275 companions at Masabadan, Abdisho, who despite the stroke of the sword remained alive, continued to preach the gospel and bury the martyrs. He stayed at the place where all the martyrs were killed during thirty days. He prayed there and taught the other villagers how to save their souls through true faith. He was captured by the lord of the village and was held in chains for 4 days. All that time the lord tried to make him abandon his faith and stop teaching the others to be alive. Abdisho denied to obey and was sentenced to death by the mayor of the village in 345.

== See also ==
- Abda and Abdjesus
