= Abselema of Edessa =

Bishop, Saint
- Feast: October 19

Abselema of Edessa is recorded as having been a disciple of Saint Addai and a bishop of Edessa, who lived in 2-d century. His feast day is celebrated on October 19.

== See also ==
- List of early Christian saints

== Sources ==
- Holweck, F. G. A Biographical Dictionary of the Saints. St. Louis, Missouri, US: B. Herder Book Co. 1924.
