= Barhadbshabba (martyr of Erbil) =

Christian martyr (d. 355)

Saint Barhadbesciabas

Hieromartyr
- Died: 4th century Arbela, Sassanid Empire
- Venerated in: Oriental Orthodox Church; Eastern Orthodox Church; Roman Catholic Church
- Feast: July 20 or July 21

Barhadbesciabas (alternately Barhadbesaba, Barhadbescialas or Barhadbshabba) (died July 20, 355) is venerated as a Christian martyr who was decapitated during the reign of Shapur II. A deacon of Arbela, in the Sassanid Empire, he was arrested by the governor of Arbela, Sapor Tamaspor, and put on the rack.

Tradition states that the authorities ordered Aghaeus, an apostate Christian nobleman, to kill Barhadbesciabas with a sword.

Another two Christians of the same name were martyred with Abda and Abdjesus in 366.

His feast day is July 21.
