= Herculanils =

Christian saint

- Born: Unknown
- Died: Unknown, 180
- Honored in: Eastern Orthodox Church, Catholic Church
- Feast: September 5

Herculanils (???-180) was an early Christian saint. His feast day in Roman Catholicism is September 5.
