= Abias =

- Venerated in: Coptic Church

Abias is a saint of the Coptic Church. He is included in the Heiligen-Lexicon by J. E. Stadler. A church in Alexandria is dedicated in his name. It is unknown what his feast day was if he ever had one.

== Sources ==
- Holweck, F. G. A Biographical Dictionary of the Saints. St. Louis, MO: B. Herder Book Co. 1924.
