= Heiligen-Lexicon =

Heiligen-Lexicon, oder Lebensgeschichten aller Heiligen by Johann Evangelist Stadler is a book of hagiography published in Augsburg in 1861. It contains biographical information on several saints, including:

- Abias
- Abiatha, Hathes and Mamlacha
- Abibion
