= St. Peter's Church, Munich =

Roman Catholic church in Munich, Germany

Coordinates: 48°08′11″N 11°34′33″E

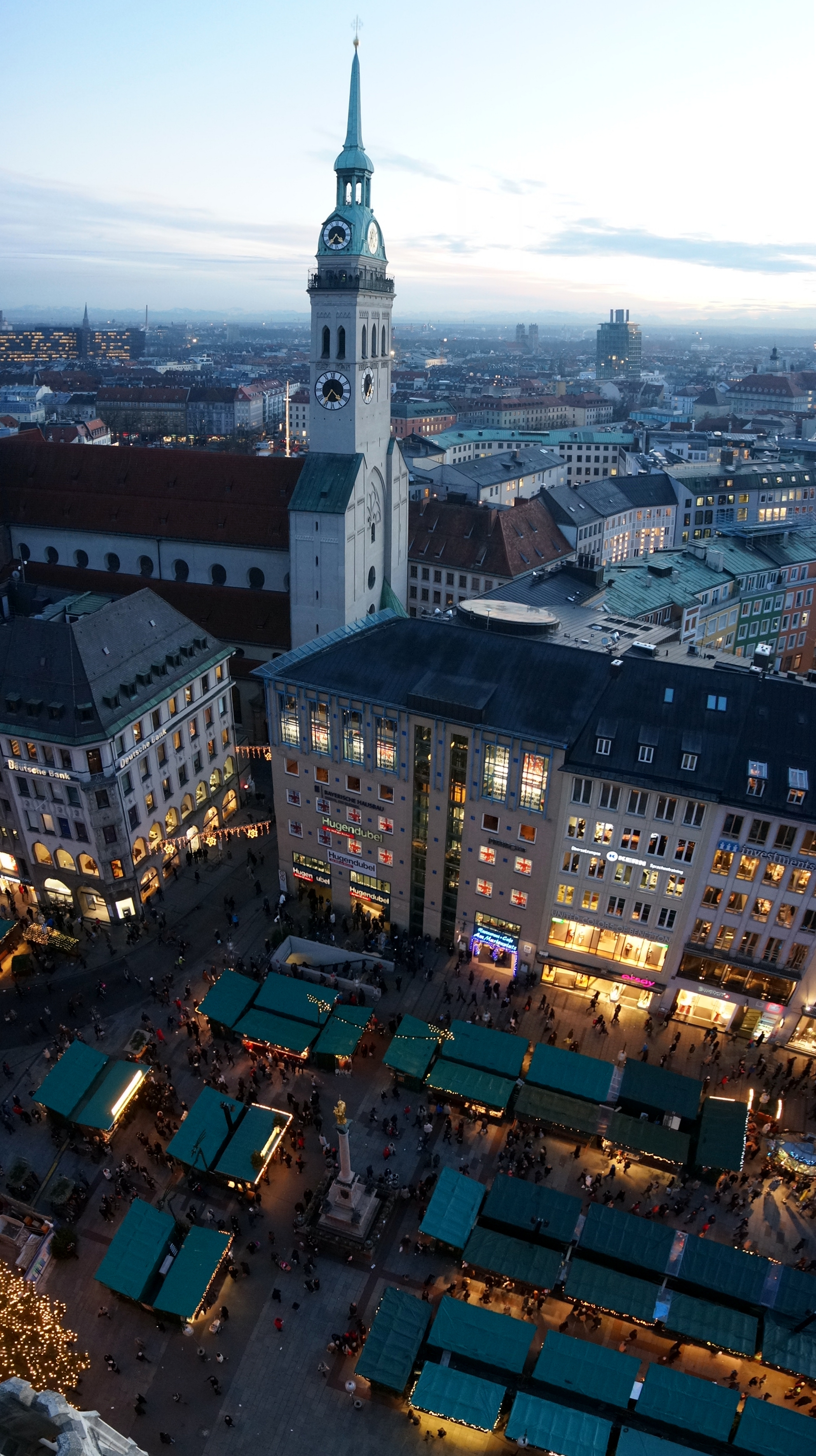
St Peter's Church

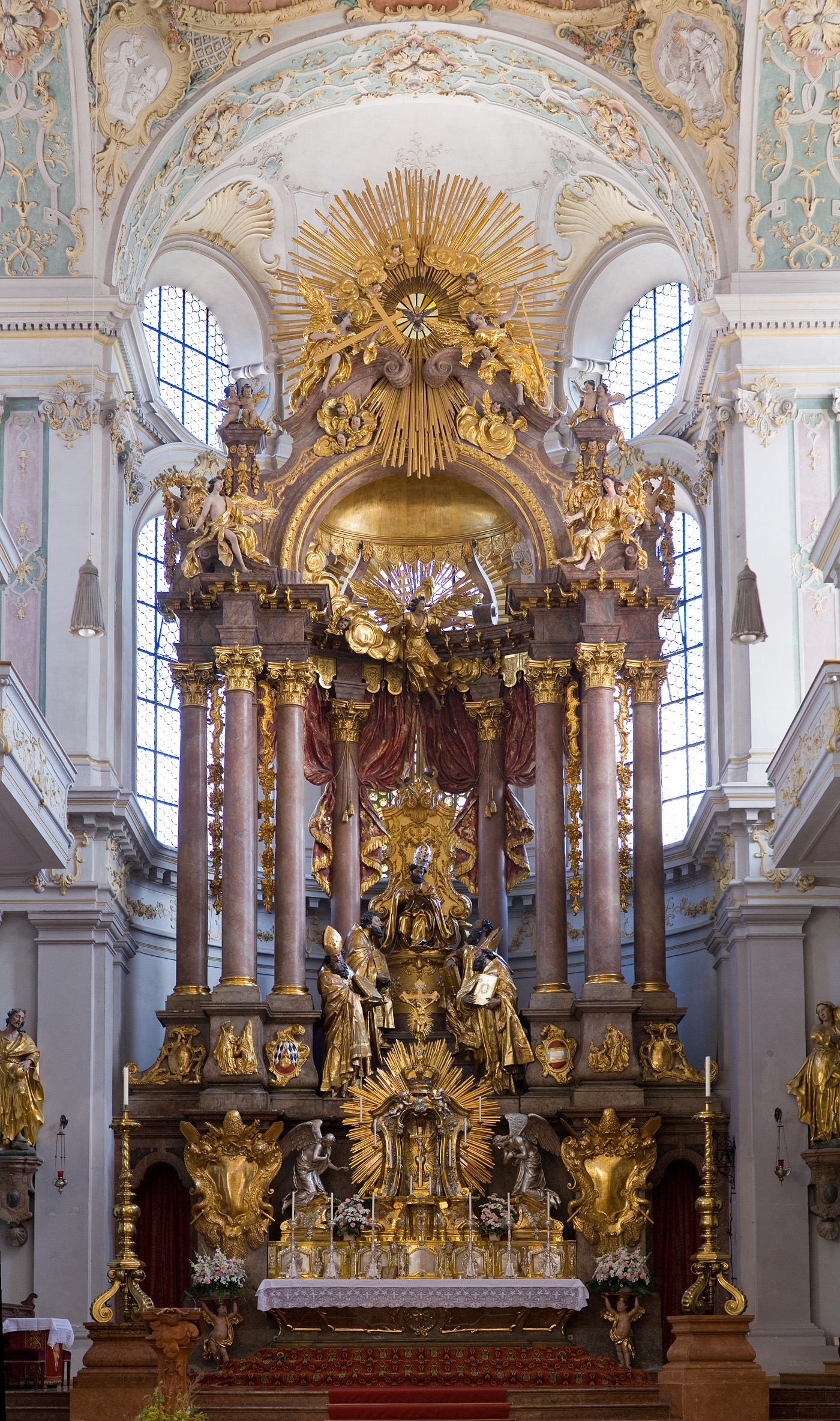
High altar

St. Peter's Church is a Roman Catholic parish church in the inner city of Munich, southern Germany. Its 91-metre (299 ft) tower is commonly known as "Alter Peter"—Old Peter—and is emblematic of Munich. St Peter's is the oldest recorded parish church in Munich and presumably the originating point for the whole city.

== History ==
Before the founding of Munich as a city in 1158, there had been a pre-Merovingian church on this site. Eighth-century monks lived around this church on a hill called Petersbergl. At the end of the 12th century, a new church in the Bavarian Romanesque style was consecrated, and expanded in Gothic style shortly before the great fire in 1327, which destroyed the building.

After its reconstruction the church was dedicated anew in 1368. In the early 17th century the 91-metre (299 ft) spire received its Renaissance steeple top and a new Baroque choir was added.

The church was heavily damaged in World War II during the Allied bombing of Munich.

The interior is dominated by the high altar to which Erasmus Grasser contributed the figure of Saint Peter. Among other masterpieces of all periods are five Gothic paintings by Jan Polack and several altars by Ignaz Günther. The ceiling fresco by Johann Baptist Zimmermann (1753–56) was restored in 1999–2000.

Relics of Munditia and Erasmus of Formia are venerated in the church.

== Bells ==
Eight bells hang in the tower, four of which are historic. The oldest and smallest bell is the Provisional Bell (also known as the Poor Sinner's Bell ). It dates from the period after the city fire of 1327 and was rung during the priest's visit to the dying or at executions in Marienplatz. Today, it hangs behind a barred window in the basement of the old north tower. It is not part of the seven-bell peal.

The other seven bells can be rung and form the lowest-pitched and one of the largest peals in Munich. The smallest bell in the peal, the so-called " Zwölferin" (Twelve ), is only slightly younger than the provisional bell. It dates from 1382 and has a beehive-like shape, which creates the characteristic sound of this bell, a sound further enhanced by its heavy ribbed construction. Its name suggests that this bell was formerly rung at noon. Two other ringing bells date from the Baroque period: the "Elferin" (Eleven), which was formerly rung at 11 a.m., was cast in 1665 by Johann Kippo, and the "Petrusglocke" (St. Peter's Bell ) in 1720 by the Munich bell founder Johann Christoph Daller. The remaining four ringing bells were cast in the 1950s.

The bourdon bell of the cathedral is the Jubilee Bell, it is the largest, lowest-pitched, and heaviest bell in Munich and was cast at the Czudnochowsky bell foundry in Erding . It is considered their masterpiece. Until the casting of the Christ the Savior Bell for Scheyern Abbey, it was the lowest-pitched bell in Bavaria. It was cast in 1958 to commemorate the 800th anniversary of the state capital and presented to the parish of St. Peter by the Prince Regent Luitpold Foundation as the Jubilee Bell . It is only rung as part of the full peal on major feast days or special parish festivals, at the end of the year, and on New Year's Eve. During a restoration, all the bells received wooden yokes, some new clappers, and some new ringing motors. In early May 2014, the Jubilee Bell had to be taken out of service due to a crack. On April 4, 2018, it was removed and taken, along with the twelve-bell, to the Lachenmeyer company in Nördlingen for welding . On May 29, 2018, the bells were returned to the tower. After being rehung, the Jubilee Bell also received a new clapper. The bell was heard again for the first time on the feast day of St. Peter on June 29, 2018.

Bell Number	Name (German)	Name (English)	Casting year	Foundry	Mass ≈ in kg
1	Jubiläumsglocke	Jubilee Bell (Bourdon)	1958	Karl Czudnochowsky	5970
2	Petrusglocke	Peter's Bell	1720	Johann Christoph Daller	2250
3	Maximiliansglocke	Maximilian Bell	1957	Karl Czudnochowsky	1490
4	Angelusglocke	Angelus bell	1951	Karl Czudnochowsky	1018
5	Maria-Hilf-Glocke	Maria-Hilf bell	1958	Karl Czudnochowsky	1100
6	Elferin	Eleven	1665	Johann Kippo	800
7	Zwölferin	Twelve	1382	<unknown>	1050
