= John and Marcianus =

Italian Roman Catholic saints

Saints John and Marcianus

Martyrs
- Died: 304; Rome, Italy
- Venerated in: Roman Catholic Church
- Canonized: Pre-Congregation
- Feast: 16 September
- Patronage: Civita Castellana, Viterbo, Italy

John and Marcianus, were Roman martyrs. Marcianus was a Roman Senator, whose son John died of unknown causes. Sts. Abundius and Abundantius, who were Christians condemned to execution, met Marcianus with his dead son on the way to their death. It is claimed that Abundius prayed over John, and he came back to life. At that moment, John and Marcianus both converted to Christianity. They too were martyred along with Sts. Abundius and Abundantius, just north of Rome, being beheaded ca. 304. The remains of Marcianus and John were found in 1001 and transferred to Civita Castellana.

Marcianus is one of the 140 Colonnade saints which adorn St. Peter's Square.
