= Simon of Bet-Titta =

Mesopotamian Christian martyr (d. 447)

Simon of Bet-Titta (died 447) was a Christian martyr at Bet-Titta, near Karka in Mesopotamia.

He was martyred with several colleagues, including Abraham of Bet-Titta and Ma'na of Bet-Titta. Their eyes were pierced with red-hot nails, and later they were shot with arrows, on 27 August 447.

They are regarded as saints, and included as such in the Ausgewählte Akten Persischer Märtyrer of Oskar Braun. Their feast day is 25 August.
