= Abundius of Pietra Montecorvina =

Italian Roman Catholic saint

- Venerated in: Roman Catholic Church
- Feast: 27 February

Abundius of Pietra Montecorvina is a Roman Catholic martyr and saint.

His relics are kept at Pietramontecorvino, near Lucera in the province of Foggia in southern Italy. His feast day is kept there on February 27.

== Sources ==
- Holweck, F. G. A Biographical Dictionary of the Saints. St. Louis, Missouri, US: B. Herder Book Co. 1924.
