= John the Hermit (Armenian) =

- Born: Armenia
- Venerated in: Eastern Orthodox Church, Eastern Catholic Churches of Byzantine Rite
- Feast: March 29, October 16

Venerable John the Hermit began his ascetic life at a young age according to records. He was born in the fourth century in Armenia to Juliana, a devout Eastern Orthodox Christian mother. John was the spiritual son of St. Pharmutius who discipled him for a time. Eventually, John chose to enter into a greater solitude, taking abode in the depths of a dry well where Pharmutius would bring him bread daily; bread provided by an angel according to sacred tradition.

Venerable John lived the life of hermit with great ascetic fervor for ten years and then is held to have gone to the Lord.

John the Hermit is commemorated 29 March in the Orthodox Church and Eastern Catholic Churches of Byzantine rite. The Orthodox Church also commemorates him on 16 October.

== See also ==
- Armenian Orthodox Church
- Armenian Catholic Church
- Armenian Rite
- Daniel the Stylite
