= Saint Pharmutius =

Saint Pharmutius, (c. 4th century) according to the Prologue from Ohrid, was a hermit in the Egyptian desert and a disciple of Anthony the Great.

Pharmutius was the spiritual mentor of Venerable John the Hermit of Armenia. Pharmutius' holiness was such that angels brought him his daily bread, which in Christian love he shared with his hermit brother John who lived in strict seclusion.

Saint Pharmutius is remembered along with John the Hermit by the Eastern Orthodox Church on 29 March.

== See also ==
- Christian monasticism
- Stylites
