= Maximus of Salzburg =

5th-century Christian bishop and martyr

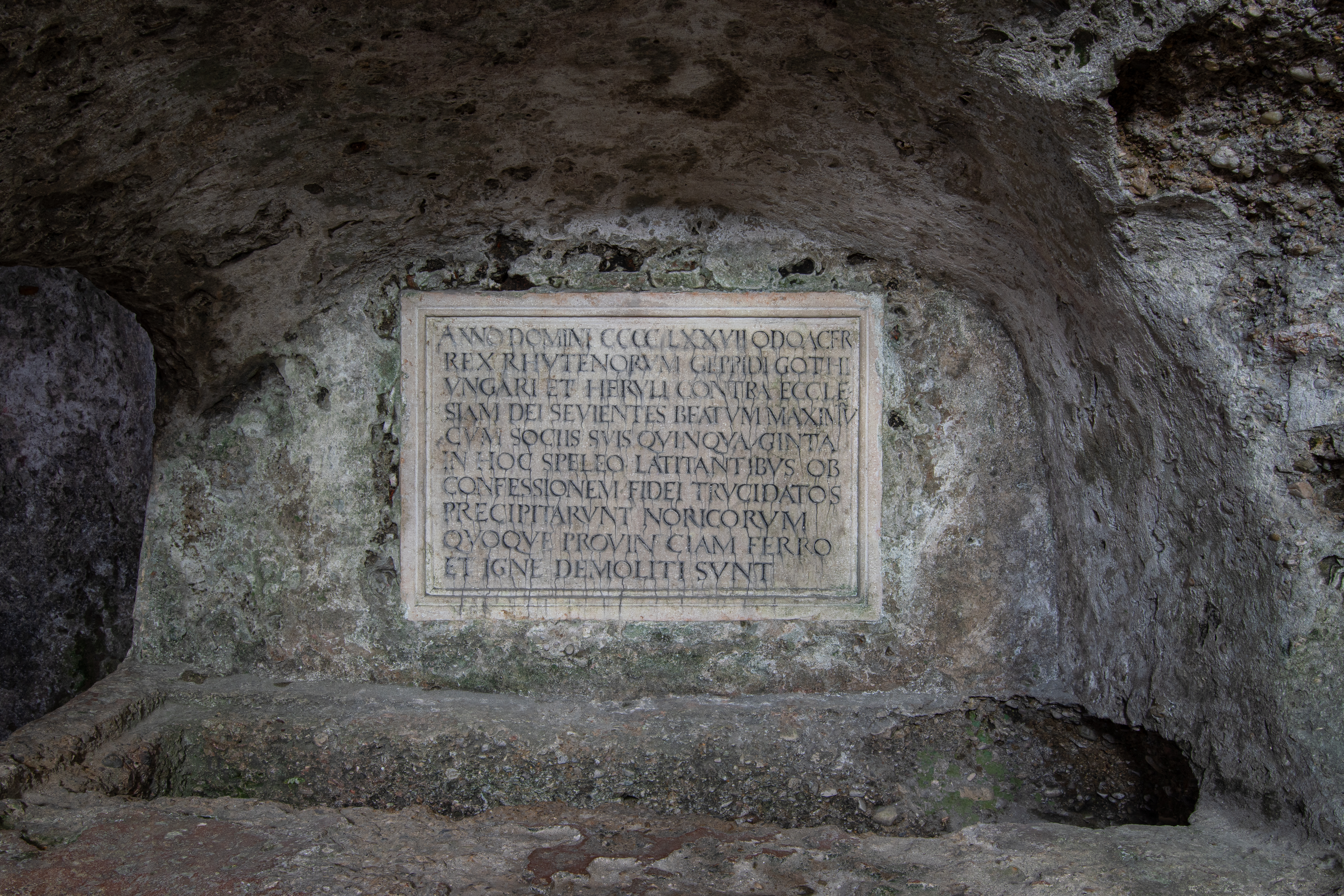
A memorial plaque for the martyrdom of Maximus of Salzburg in the catacombs of St. Peter's Cemetery, installed in 1521

Maximus of Salzburg (died 476) was an abbot-bishop of Salzburg in the 5th century when the see was established in 474. A disciple of Severinus of Noricum, Maximus was an early Christian martyr - according to some accounts he was hanged, while other say that he and his parishioners were thrown off a cliff. After he was martyred, the bishopric was abandoned. Christianity did not return to the area until the 8th century with the arrival of Arno of Salzburg as a bishop and later archbishop of Salzburg.
