= Dausa (bishop) =

Christian bishop

Dausa (also known as Dosa) was a bishop and martyr of the Christian church.

Dausa was a priest at Bet Zabdai in Mesopotamia. In 344, he was taken to Persia with his bishop Heliodorus of Bet Zabdai at the order of Shapur II. As Heliodorus lay dying at Daskarata, he consecrated Dausa to be his successor bishop. Dausa was beheaded with 275 companions at Masabadan in Media, after having refused to worship the sun. He is commemorated with a feast day of August 20.
