= Pausilypus =

Saint Pausilypus
- Died: 140 AD; Heraclea Sintica
- Venerated in: Roman Catholic Church
- Feast: 8 April & 15 April

Saint Pausilypus was a Christian martyr of the 2nd century. He was condemned to be beheaded under Emperor Hadrian; however, the chains in which he was bound fell from him on the way and he miraculously escaped from his persecutors. He died soon after, about 140 AD at Heraclea Sintica in Thrace, as a result of the torture inflicted on him by his captors.

When commemorated on his own, his feast is April 8; when commemorated with the Roman Martyrs, April 15.
