= Eusebonas =

Eusebonas (or Eusebonus) (fl. 5th century) was one of the founders of Bet-Coryph monastery in Byzantine Syria, together with Abibion. He received his instruction from Eusebius.
