= Urpasian =

Saint and martyr

Saint Urpasian of Nicomedia

Martyr
- Born: 3rd century
- Died: c. 305; Nicomedia (modern-day Izmit, Kocaeli, Turkey)
- Venerated in: Eastern Orthodox Church; Roman Catholic Church
- Feast: March 9 (Orthodoxy); March 13 (Catholicism)

Saint Urpasian is a 4th-century saint and martyr. He was a dignitary of Roman Emperor Galerius (293–311).

Urpasian suffered martyrdom in the city of Nicomedia. The emperor Galerius persecuted Christians serving in his army and at his court. Urpasian was a member of the imperial household at Nicomedia. Some of the timid of soul began to waver and began to worship the pagan gods, but the strong of soul held out firmly until the very end. Urpasian renounced his position as a servant of the emperor stating, "Henceforth I am a warrior of the Heavenly King, the Lord Jesus Christ. Take back the insignia that was given to me." He was arrested for his Christian beliefs, and was burned alive.

In the Orthodox Church, he is commemorated on March 9. In Roman Catholicism, his feast day is celebrated on March 13.

== See also ==
- Forty Martyrs of Sebaste, also commemorated on March 9
