= Abundius and Abundantius =

Christian martyrs

- Died: c. 304 north of Rome
- Feast: 16 September

Abundius and Abundantius (died c. 304) are Christian martyrs who were killed during the Diocletian persecution. Their feast day is celebrated on September 16.

== Biography ==
Abundius was a priest who was claimed to have earlier resurrected John, the son of Marcianus. Upon hearing of this, the emperor ordered these three, with Abundantius, a deacon, to be beheaded. The executions were carried out at the 26th milestone of the Via Flaminia.

== Veneration ==
Their bodies were later transferred to the church of Cosmas and Damian in Rome. The bodies of Marcianus and John were found around 1001 and transferred to Civita Castellana. There, they were elected to be the city's principal patron saints. In 1583, the relics of Abundius and Abundantius were transferred to the SS. Nome di Gesu, where they were placed under the church's high altar. Aloysius Gonzaga heard mass there before becoming a Jesuit.

== See also ==
- Abundius of Umbria – martyred north of Rome in the Diocletian persecution.
- Abundius of Palestrina

== Sources ==
- Holweck, F. G. A Biographical Dictionary of the Saints. St. Louis, Missouri, United States: B. Herder Book Co. 1924
