= Munditia =

Christian martyr

Saint Munditia
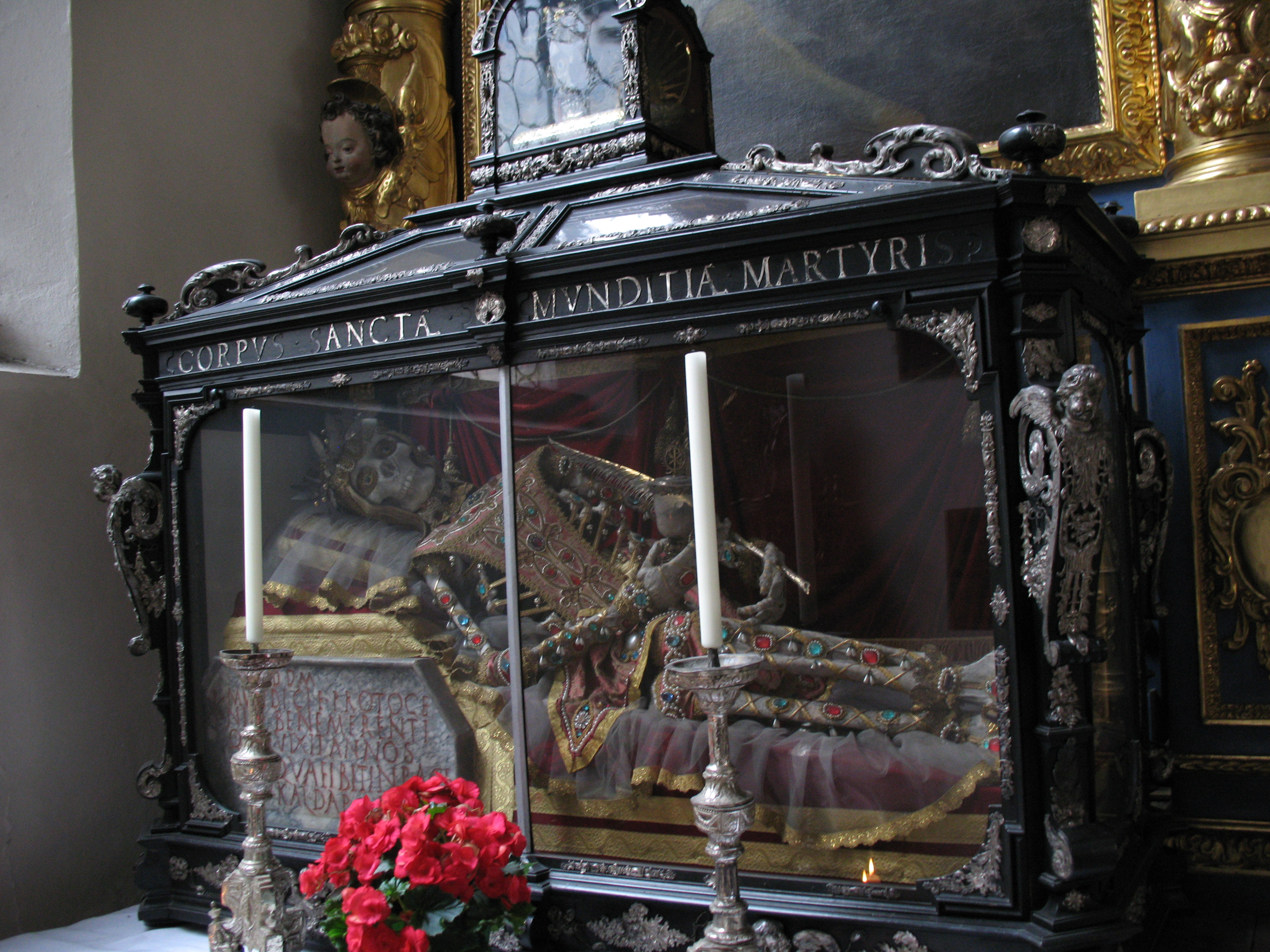
- Relics of Munditia in St. Peter's Church (Old Peter, Alter Peter), Munich.

Virgin and Martyr
- Born: 290; Piasca, Hispania
- Died: 310; Rome, Italy
- Venerated in: Roman Catholic Church
- Major shrine: St. Peter's Church, Munich
- Feast: 17 November
- Patronage: single, unmarried women

Saint Munditia (or Mundita) is venerated as a Christian martyr.

== Relics ==
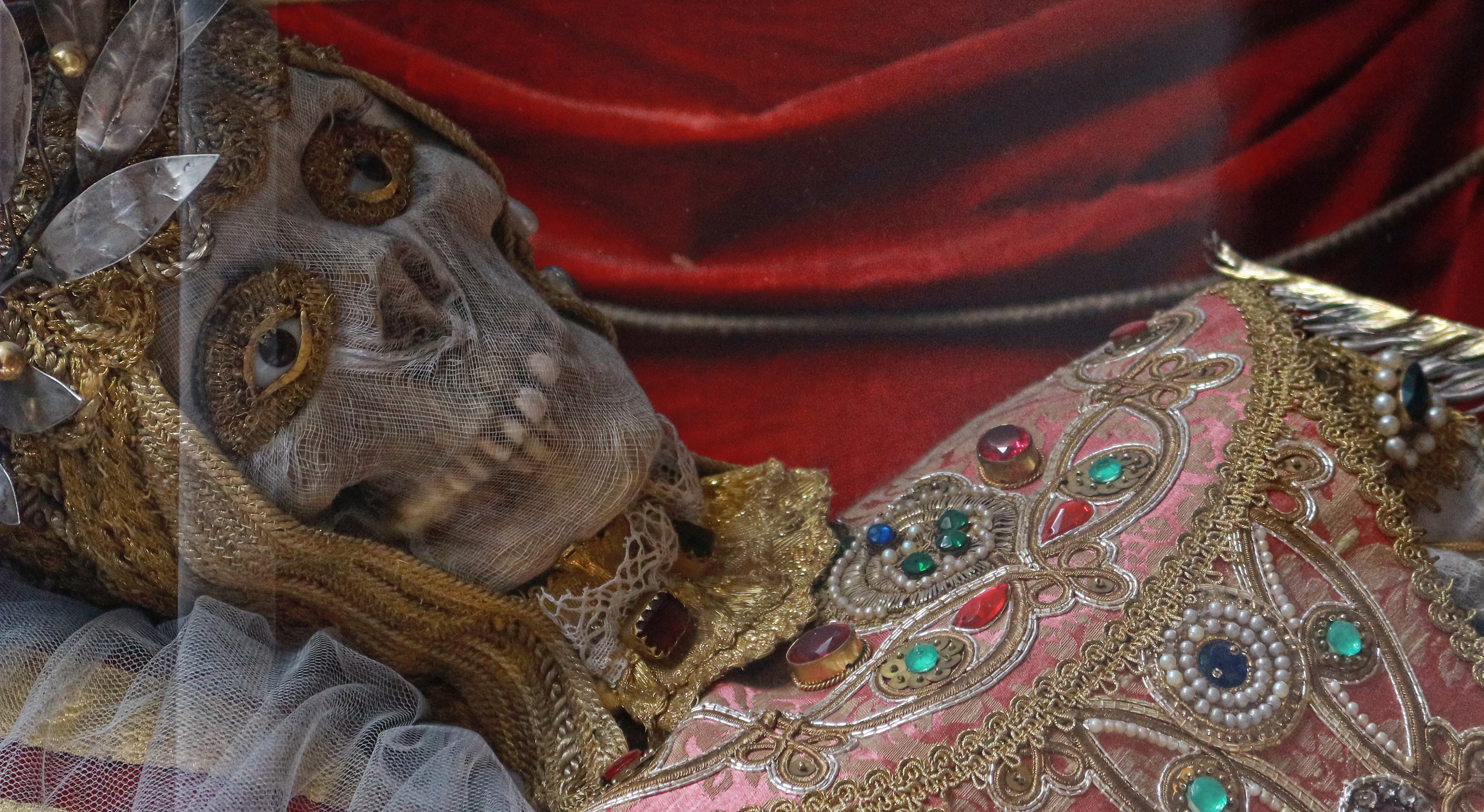
A close up of Saint Muniditia's body

Her relics are found in a side altar at St. Peter's Church (known as "Old Peter," Alter Peter) in Munich. They consist of a gilt-covered and gem-studded skeleton, located in a glass case, with false eyes in her skull, which is wrapped in netting.

=== Inscription ===
The inscription on the stone slab that originally sealed the arcosolium in the catacombs and that is now located below the head of the skeleton reads:

DDM MUNDICIE PROTOGENIE BENEMERENTI QUAE VIXIT ANNOS LX QUAE IBIT IN PACE XV KAL D APC

In devout remembrance of Munditia Protogenia. The commendable. Who lived 60 years. Who passed peacefully into eternity 15 days before the Calends of December APC

— Anonymous, Inscription on reliquary

The meaning of "APC" is unclear. The Roman document of authenticity states that it means "ASCIA PLEXA CAPITA" ("beheaded with a hatchet"), describing the manner of her martyrdom. "APC" may also refer to: "ANDRONICO PROBO CONSULIBUS", referring to the fact that she died during the consulate of Andronicus and Probus, thus making her date of death 310 AD.

=== History ===
Born in the 3rd century, Munditia lived through tumultuous times, embracing her faith with an ardor that would eventually lead to her martyrdom.

Her relics were translated to Munich from Rome in 1675 from the catacombs of Cyriaca. They were transferred to her Baroque Era-shrine which was consecrated on September 5, 1677. In 1804, her relics were concealed behind a wooden shrine, but this was removed in 1883, restoring interest in her cult. Her feast day is now celebrated annually with a High Mass and a procession with candles.

== Cultural references ==
Vahni Capildeo's poem, called "Saint Munditia", is found in their collection No Traveller Returns, in which they describe the saint as being "dug up from her burial / a millennium and a third since the flesh fell off her. / She's back in church."

St Munditia is the patron saint of single women and spinsters in the Catholic faith. Despite her obscure origins and the mystery surrounding her life, she is venerated for her alleged steadfastness in faith.
