= Abibion =

Abibion (fl. 5th century) was one of the founders of the Bet-Coryph Monastery in Byzantine Syria, together with Eusebonas. He also served as the first abbot of that monastery. He is included in the Heiligen-Lexicon. He received his instruction from Eusebius. His feast day, if he had one, is unknown.

== Sources ==
- Holweck, F. G., A Biographical Dictionary of the Saints. St. Louis, MO: B. Herder Book Co. 1924.
- Davies, Gordon J, Social Life of Early Christians, Lutterworth Press (1954)
