= Acts of Xanthippe, Polyxena, and Rebecca =

New Testament apocrypha dating from the 3rd or 4th century

The Acts of Xanthippe, Polyxena, and Rebecca is a work of New Testament apocrypha dating from the third or fourth century.

Regarding its place in literature, 20th-century classicist scholar Moses Hadas writes: "Christians learned not only from pagan preachers but also from pagan romancers. The perfectly orthodox Acts of Xanthippe and Polyxena ... has all the thrilling kidnapings, deliveries, and surprises of the typical Greek romance".

The tale is set in the time of Nero and consists of essentially two almost completely separate stories: the tale of Xanthippe and the tale of Polyxena. Although a third woman named Rebecca is included in the title, she doesn't figure as a major character. The liturgical feast of these figures is Sept. 23.

== The Tale of Xanthippe ==
Having briefly witnessed Paul preach in Rome, a servant returns to Spain and falls sick due to wishing to have heard Paul properly. The master's wife, Xanthippe, overhears the servant explaining this, so she speaks privately with the servant, which causes statues of the household gods to fall down. Xanthippe thereupon proceeds to fast, pray, lose sleep, and enter into celibacy, gradually wasting away.

Paul is led by God to come to Xanthippe but, when she expresses a desire to be baptized, her husband throws Paul out and locks Xanthippe up. Xanthippe then prays that her husband will fall asleep at dinner, which he does, so she is able to escape the house by bribing the porter. On her way to Paul, Xanthippe is attacked by demons wielding fire and lightning, from which she is saved by a vision of Jesus (as a beautiful youth) and Paul finding her. Paul then takes her indoors where she is baptised and given the Eucharist.

Returning home, Xanthippe has a vision and collapses. Her husband soon awakes and, having had a dream, asks some wise men for an interpretation. They declare that the dream reveals the struggle between Satan and Christ and advise that the husband be baptized. When they look in on his wife Xanthippe, expecting her to be near death, they discover her singing praises to Jesus. This impresses the wise men to the extent that they have Xanthippe take them to Paul. All of this induces her husband to likewise convert.

== The Tale of Polyxena ==
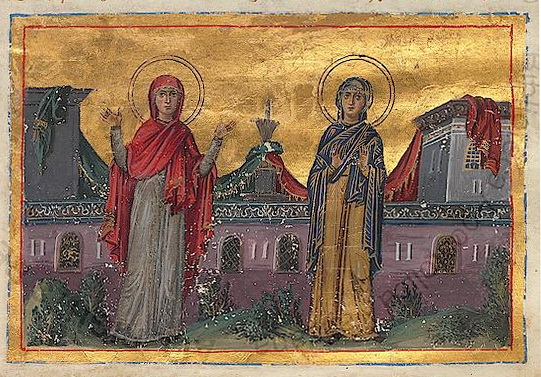
Xanthippe and Polyxene (Menologion of Basil II)

Xanthippe's younger sister, Polyxena, later has a dream in which she is swallowed by a dragon but then rescued by a beautiful youth. Xanthippe thinks this means that Satan will win Polyxena unless she is immediately baptized. But Polyxena's initial attempts to secure baptism fail and she is abducted in the night by an enemy of Polyxena's boyfriend and put on a ship to Babylonia.

The winds, however, force the ship to approach one bearing the apostle Peter, who had been directed by a vision. But demons prevent them meeting. The ship, instead, goes off course to Greece, where the apostle Philip has come. Having been directed by a vision, Philip rescues Polyxena. When his thirty servants, armed with a cross, go to meet the abductor's army of 8,000, they slay 5,000 soldiers before the remainder flee. But Polyxena has meanwhile fled in fear.

She ends up lost and unintentionally walks into the empty den of a lioness. When the lioness returns, Polyxena begs the animal not to eat her before she is baptized. So the lioness leads her east out of the woods to a road and then goes back to her den. The apostle Andrew coincidentally walks past and Polyxena asks for baptism. So they find a well and rescue Rebecca, a Jewish slave held captive there. Then both are baptized when the lioness returns and asks Andrew to perform the task.

Later, after Andrew departs, the women briefly gain the company of an ordinary Christian driving a cart but lose it when they are abducted by a passing prefect. Rebecca later manages to escape and flee to an old woman's house (and disappears from the story). Meanwhile, Polyxena begs the prefect's servants to preserve her virginity; so they tell the prefect that she is ill. The prefect's son, a convert to Christianity after witnessing Paul's effect on Thecla, disguises her in his clothing and sends her to the shore to catch a ship. But a villainous servant overhears and reports them. They are captured and thrown to a lioness in the arena. But the lioness turns out to be the one previously encountered and does no harm. As a result, the entire city takes this to be proof of the truth of Christianity and so convert en-masse.

The narrator reveals himself as Onesimus, a sailor who has received a vision telling him to go to a certain part of Greece and pick up both Polyxena and the prefect's son. However, after his arrival, a storm keeps everyone there for seven days. So Lucius, who is on board, teaches Christianity to the entire city. The prefect then gratefully supplies provisions to the ship and it leaves. Then it comes to rest on an island. The fierce inhabitants there attack but are defeated, though Polyxena fearfully dives into the sea and has to be rescued. Eventually all arrive back in Spain and meet Paul. When Polyxena's abductor returns, Paul converts him as well.

== Bibliography ==
- Gorman, Jill. Reading and Theorizing Women's Sexualities: The Representation of Women in the Acts of Xanthippe and Polyxena (Dissertation: Temple University, 2003).
- Gorman, Jill. Thinking with and about "Same-Sex Desire": Producing and Policing Female Sexuality in the Acts of Xanthippe and Polyxena Journal of the History of Sexuality - Volume 10, Number 3 and 4, July/October 2001, pp. 416–441.
- Moses Hadas. Three Greek Romances, The Liberal Arts Press, Inc., a division of The Bobbs Merrill Company, Inc.: Indianapolis, Indiana. 1953. ISBN 0-672-60442-6
