= Clateus =

Christian martyr and saint (died 64 AD)

Saint Clateus

Martyr
- Died: 64
- Venerated in: Roman Catholic Church, True Orthodox Church, Orthodox Church
- Feast: 4 June

Clateus (died 64 AD) was an early Christian martyr and saint. He was an early Christian bishop in Brescia, Italy, and was martyred during the persecutions of Christians by Nero.
