= Abiatha, Hathes and Mamlacha =

Martyrs and Virgins
- Venerated in: Syriac Orthodox Church
- Feast: November 20

Abiatha, Hathes, and Mamlacha were virgins and martyrs of the Beth-Garma province of Syria. The word "Belth" in Chaldaic means "hill", this city was built on a hill in Assyria. They were martyred under Shapur II, about 345 AD. Their feast day is November 20. They are included in the Heiligen-Lexicon by J. E. Stadler. Mamlacha is also a Hebrew word which means "Kingdom".

== Sources ==
- Holweck, F. G. A Biographical Dictionary of the Saints. St. Louis, MO: B. Herder Book Co. 1924.
- Butler, Alban; Butler, Charles (1799). The Lives of the Primitive Fathers, Martyrs, and Other Principal Saints, Vol 11. London: E.Booker, New Bond street. p. 490.
