= Evellius =

Christian martyr

Saint Evellius

Martyr
- Died: c. 66; Pisa, Roman Italy
- Venerated in: Roman Catholic Church; Eastern Orthodox Church
- Feast: 11 May

Evellius (Italian: Evelio, Evellio, died c. AD 66) was an early Christian martyr. He was a counselor to the emperor Nero who converted to Christianity during the martyrdom of Saint Torpes of Pisa. He fled to Rome but was apprehended and executed on his arrival.

Evellius is venerated by saint in both the Roman Catholic Church and Eastern Orthodox Churches, and his feast day is celebrated on 11 May.
