= Abundius of Palestrina =

Roman Catholic saint

- Feast: 29 October

Abundius of Palestrina is a saint of the Christian church. His feast day is celebrated on October 29 in Palestrina.

== Sources ==
- Holweck, F. G., A Biographical Dictionary of the Saints. St. Louis, Missouri, US: B. Herder Book Co. 1924
