= Idus of Leinster =

5th century Irish Saint

- Feast: July 14

Idus of Leinster was an Irish saint of the fifth century. He was said to be a disciple of Saint Patrick, who baptized him. Saint Idus took part in the Great Evangelization of Ireland. He was made bishop of Alt-Fadha (Ath-Fado) in Leinster by Patrick. Feast day - July 14.
