= Zeno the Hermit =

Venerable Hermit
- Died: 416; Antioch
- Honored in: Eastern Orthodox Church; Byzantine Catholic churches
- Feast: 30 January
- Patronage: Postal workers

Saint Zeno the Hermit (338-416) was a disciple of St. Basil the Great and a hermit. He is venerated as a saint by the Eastern Orthodox Church and Byzantine Catholic churches and his feast day is on 30 January.

== Biography ==
=== Early life ===
Zeno was born to a Christian family of privilege and status in the region of Pontus around the year 339. From an early age he devoted himself to the study of letters and sciences and quickly distinguished himself and became known to all, for the multitude of his virtues, his perfect education, his morals, his physique and his distinguished parents.

When Emperor Valens ascended the throne in AD 364, he summoned the now famous Zeno to his palace and offered him a great position. Zeno accepted and spent his early adulthood in the emperor's service. When however there was a vacancy for the position of Royal Postman, Zeno offered his services. The position which Zeno occupied was one of significant respect and prestige for to be such a courier was to bear the implicit trust of the Emperor. Messages needed to arrive swiftly, secretly and safely to where they were sent and in antiquity, this was far from a guarantee. The persons selected to be messengers on the public post had to be both physically fit and morally incorruptible, worthy of the personal confidence of the Emperor. Working amongst the soldiers who were sent out to deliver the imperial edicts enabled him to be close to the Church Fathers, the ascetics and the common people who lived simply and virtuously in the provinces. During his time in cursus publicus, Zeno stayed in monasteries and hermitages, praising and glorifying God. The name of the emperor's simple and humble postman had become known in many towns and villages, especially to the poor and suffering. A royal mission to Bishop Basil of Caesarea determined the later course of Zeno's life, as he was enchanted by Basil's eloquence, preaching and his humble, ascetic life.

=== Life as a hermit ===
Upon the death of the emperor in AD 378, Zeno abandoned his post and sought the ascetic life of a hermit; near Antioch he took up residence in a cave where he dwelt far from society for some forty years. He became well known for his humility and holiness. Zeno's mattress was a stack of grass on stones and he dressed in rags. His food was bread, which a friend of his used to bring him every two days, and he brought the water himself from far away. When the Isaurians invaded that place and killed many ascetics, Zeno blinded them with his prayer, and they missed the door of his cell.

Saint Zeno died in AD 416 at the age of 78, leaving a reputation as a holy hermit throughout the Byzantine Empire.

== Veneration ==
Zeno the Hermit of Antioch is commemorated on 30 January in the Eastern Orthodox Church and Byzantine Catholic Churches. In Greece he was declared the protector of postal workers by the Greek Post Office in 1968. He is commemorated with a holiday for all postal workers on 10 February.

== See also ==
- Christian monasticism
- Stylites
- Poustinia
