= Abibus of Samosata =

Christian martyr

Martyr
- Died: 297 AD; Samosata
- Feast: December 9

Abibus of Samosata (died 297) was a Christian martyr at Samosata (in Syria on the River Euphrates). He lived during the period of Diocletianic Persecution. He was arrested for refusing to take part in a pagan ritual to celebrate the victory of Emperor Maximian over the Persians. He was thrown to prison where his body was scratched with iron, he had heavy shackles over his neck. In 297 he was sentenced to be executed by crucifixion. After having lived for two days on the cross, he was taken down and his head was pierced by nails. He was crucified together with other martyrs – James, Romanus, Lollius, Philotheus and Paregrus. All these martyrs were commemorated on 29 January in the Byzantine Church and by the Armenian Church in October.

His feast day is kept on December 9.

== External sources ==
- Holweck, F. G. A Biographical Dictionary of the Saints. St. Louis, MO: B. Herder Book Co. 1924.
- Butler, Alban (1995). Butler's Lives of the Saints, Vol.12. Great Britain: A&C Black. p. 78. ISBN 9780814623886.
- Matthew Bunson, Encyclopedia of Saints, Second Edition 2nd ed. Edition (2014). Publisher: Our Sunday Visitor; 2nd ed. edition, ISBN 1612787169
- Ramsgate Benedictine Monks of St.Augustine's Abbey, The Book of Saints (Reference) (2002). Publisher: A & C Black Publishers Ltd; 7th edition, ISBN 0713653000
