= Oskar Braun =

German Syriac scholar (1862–1931)

Oskar Braun (1862–1931) was a Syriac specialist and ordained Catholic priest. He was born in Dillingen an der Donau in 1862 and was ordained as a priest in 1885, becoming chaplain at Santa Maria dell’Anima. He studied languages with Ignazio Guidi while in Rome, and obtained a doctoral degree from the Ludwig-Maximilians-Universität München in 1890. He worked as a professor of Semitic languages at the University of Würzburg from 1894, and of patristics from 1907 until his retirement in 1927. His work Ausgewählte Akten Persischer Märtyrer ("Selected Acts of Persian Martyrs"), published in 1915, is still cited by scholars today. His Timothei Patriarchae I Epistulae, vol. 1, an edition and translation of Timothy I's letters, also remains current and was reprinted in 2009.
