= Sabinus of Hermopolis =

Christian martyr and saint

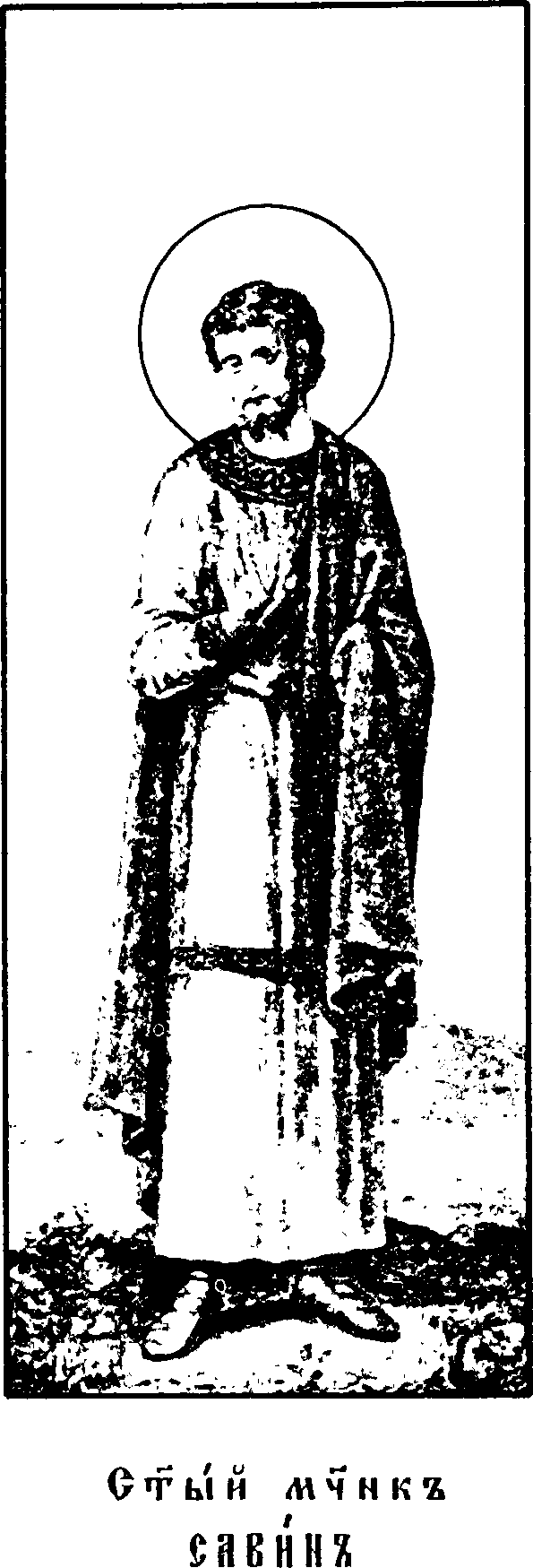

Sabinus of Hermopolis (also known as Abibus and Phanas) was a procurator, possibly bishop, and Christian martyr of Hermopolis in Egypt.

During the persecution of Diocletian he and several other Christians concealed themselves in a hut. Their presence there was ultimately revealed to the government by someone whose identity remains dubious. That person is described as either a beggar or a physician. Sabinus was then taken to Antinoöpolis, where, after being subjected to a variety of tortures, he was drowned in the Nile.

Some believe he was governor and bishop. It is known that he was a nobleman by birth, who took in Christians and did work with the poor.

He is recognized as a saint by several Christian churches. His feast day in the Roman Catholic Church is March 13. The Greek Orthodox Church gives him the full office of March 16. He is also commemorated in the Coptic Church on February 20.
