= Abundius and Irenaeus =

Roman martyrs

- Died: 258; Rome
- Feast: 26 August and 13 August in the Orthodox Church

Abundius and Irenaeus (died 258) were Roman martyrs during the reign of Roman Emperor Valerian (253–260). Their feast in the Roman Martyrology is celebrated on August 26. Abundius also has separate commemorations in Augsburg and Orvieto.

== Life ==
Abundius was a devout Christian of Rome, and Irenaeus was a sewer-keeper. Together, they buried the body of Saint Concordia. Saint Concordia was the nurse of Hippolytus. On stating to Valerian the urban prefect that she was a Christian, she was beaten to death, and her body was thrown into the sewer. Irenaeus found the body of St. Concordia and with the help of his colleague Abundius, was able to retrieve it and deliver it to Justinus, who reverently buried her on 25 August in the cemetery of Hippolytus on the Ager Veranus. Her death, however, is commemorated on 22 February in the Martyrologium Hieronymianum, with a clear indication that she was buried in the cemetery of St. Laurence on the Via Tiburtina.

As a result of this activity, Irenaeus and Abundius after being reported to the prefect, were thrown into the sewer and suffocated by the orders of Valerian, on 26 August. Their bodies were recovered and buried by Justinus.

Their story is a part of the cycle of stories of Lawrence and Hippolytus, and is generally considered untrustworthy.

== Veneration ==
A basilica was erected in their honor near San Lorenzo fuori le Mura. Their bodies are buried in the cemetery of Saint Cyriaca. They are commemorated on 26 August in the Martyrologium Hieronymianum.
