= Saint Rais =

Egyptian saint

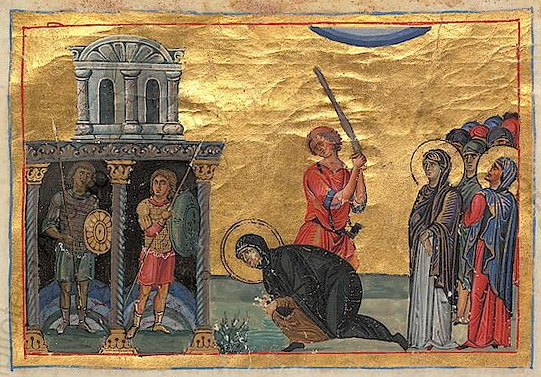

Martyr
- Born: 3rd century AD. Tabne, Roman Province of Egypt
- Died: 303 AD. Tamman or Antinoöpolis, Roman Province of Egypt
- Venerated in: Roman Catholic Church, Oriental Orthodox Church, Eastern Orthodox Church
- Canonized: Pre-Congregation
- Feast: September 23

Rais, also known as Iris, Iraida, Irais, Herais or Rhais, is a martyr venerated by the Roman Catholic and the Eastern Orthodox churches. According to one account, she was the daughter of a Christian priest named Peter living in Alexandria, Roman Province of Egypt.

== Biography ==
At the age of twelve, she was sent to live in a women's monastery at Tamman. One day in 303 AD, during a time of widespread persecution of Christians during the reign of the Roman Emperor Diocletian, she went to a well to draw water with other nuns. On the way, they saw a ship with a group of nuns, monks, and other Christians in chains, who were being abused by Loukianos and his men. Rais berated the abusers and insisted that they kill her as well if they were killing Christians. They took her into custody. When the ship had reached Antinoöpolis, Rais was one of the first to die. When Loukianos yelled out, "I spit upon the Christian God," Rais objected, stepped up and spat into the tyrant's face. Loukianos then ordered the girl to be tortured and beheaded.
