= Saint Abundantia =

Christian Saint

- Born: 783; Spoleto, Italy
- Died: 804; Spoleto, Italy
- Venerated in: Spoleto, Italy
- Feast: 19 January

Saint Abundantia (783-804) was a Christian saint. Her feast day is 19 January.

== Life ==
She was born in Spoleto, and was educated by Majolus of Cluny. She later made a pilgrimage to Jerusalem with her mother. She would go on to spend five years in the cave of Onuphrius in the desert of Upper Egypt.

She is said to have cultivated devotion in honor of archangel Raphael.

She returned to Spoleto, where she died in 804.

The story of her life has been challenged, and is considered by at least some as unreliable.

== Notes and references ==
- Holweck, F. G., A Biographical Dictionary of the Saints. St. Louis, Missouri: B. Herder Book Co. 1924.
