= Heliodorus of Bet Zabdai =

Syrian bishop

Heliodorus of Bet Zabdai (died 344) was a Syrian bishop of Bet Zabdai in Mesopotamia and a martyr.

Around 337 Shapur II invaded Roman Mesopotamia, commencing a drawn out war. Under his reign, Christians were persecuted as a reaction to the encouragement of Christianity by Constantine the Great. Shapur besieged and captured Bet Zabdai. Heliodorus was taken to Persia as a prisoner of war. The prisoners were set on a long march to Bet Huzaje. Along the way, Heliodorus fell ill and named the priest Dausa as his successor. He died as a result of ill treatment and fatigue at Daskarata on the Great Zab, in 344. He is commemorated with a feast day on August 20.

== Sources ==
- Holweck, F. G. A Biographical Dictionary of the Saints. St. Louis, MO: B. Herder Book Co., 1924.
