= Abundius of Umbria =

Roman Catholic saint

- Died: 303

Abundius of Umbria, also known as Abundius of Syria (died 303) was a deacon and martyr during the Diocletian persecution.

== Biography ==
He was the grandson of Anastasius, and accompanied him and others from Syria to Umbria, where he was martyred.

No specific feast day in his name is known.

== Sources ==
- Holweck, F. G., A Biographical Dictionary of the Saints. St. Louis, MO: B. Herder Book Co. 1924.
