= Abda and Abdisho =

Martyred Christian bishops

Bishops, Martyrs
- Died: 16 May 376
- Venerated in: Catholic Church, Eastern Orthodox Church, Syriac Orthodox Church, Church of the East
- Feast: 16 May

Abdisho and Abda were two successive bishops of Kashkar who were martyred along with 38 companions in 376 during the Forty-Year Persecution in the Sasanian Empire.

Accused by his nephew of being a spy for the Roman Empire, Abdisho was arrested by the Sasanian authorities along with the priest Abd Alaha. They were tortured on the orders of Ardashir, viceroy of Adiabene, who then sent them on to Gondeshapur, where King Shapur II had them pressed between boards until their limbs were broken. According to the hagiography, they refused food that had been sacrificed to idols and were fed by a pious widow.

In Abdisho's absence, a new bishop was appointed, Abda, who was soon also accused of spying for Rome. He was arrested with 28 others and seven virgins and all were led in chains to Gondeshapur. According to the hagiography, they refused to worship the sun and each received one hundred lashes. Two Christian brothers, Barhadbshabba and Samuel, voluntarily joined them. All but the virgins were beheaded on 15 May 376. The next day, Abdisho and Abd Alaha were dealt the same fate. Roman slaves from a nearby village took the bodies. The virgins were executed on 22 May.

There may have been a political aspect to the persecution, since the king was attempting to establish Mazdaism as the state religion and judged Christians as the natural allies of the Romans. The historian Sozomen wrote about 22 martyrs who were tortured together. He mentions Abdas and Abdisho in 15th and 16th places in his list of martyrs. This information is worth trusting because it was written less than 100 years after their death.

Their feast day is 16 May in the Church of the East and according to the Martyrologium Romanum, the Eastern Orthodox Church, and the Syriac Orthodox Church.

== 38 companions ==
The biographical text Ausgewählte Akten Persischer Märtyrer by Oskar Braun also mentions the names of several of the other martyrs, including:

Priests (16)

- Abd Alaha (ܥܲܒ݂ܕܲܠܵܗܵܐ, ˁavdalāhā, "servant of God")
- Simeon (ܫܸܡܥܘܿܢ, šemˁōn, "Simon")
- Abraham (ܐܲܒ݂ܪܵܗܵܡ, avrāhām)
- Aba (ܐܲܒ݂ܵܐ, avā, "father")
- Ajabel (ܐܲܝܲܗܒܝܼܠ, ayyahbīl)
- Joseph (ܝܵܘܣܸܦ, yawsef)
- Han (ܥܲܢܝܼ, ˁannī)
- Ebedjesu (ܥܲܒ݂ܕܝܼܫܘܿܥ, ˁavdīšōˁ, "servant of Jesus")
- Abd Alaha (ܥܲܒ݂ܕܲܠܵܗܵܐ, ˁavdalāhā, "servant of God")
- John (ܝܘܿܚܲܢܵܢ, yōḥannān)
- Ebedjesu (ܥܲܒ݂ܕܝܼܫܘܿܥ, ˁavdīšōˁ, "servant of Jesus")
- Maris (ܡܵܪܝܼ, mārī)
- Berhadbesciaba (ܒܲܪܚܲܕ݂ܒܫܲܒܵܐ, bar-ḥaḏ-b-šabbā, "son of Sunday")
- Rozichaeus (ܪܙܝܩܝܐ, rzīqyā)
- Abd Alaha (ܥܲܒ݂ܕܲܠܵܗܵܐ, ˁavdalāhā, "servant of God")
- Ebedjesu (ܥܲܒ݂ܕܝܼܫܘܿܥ, ˁavdīšōˁ, "servant of Jesus")

Deacons (9)

- Eliab (ܐܠܝܗܒ)
- Ebedjesu (ܥܲܒ݂ܕܝܼܫܘܿܥ, ˁavdīšōˁ, "servant of Jesus")
- Marjab (ܡܵܪܝܲܗ݇ܒ݂, māryav, "the lord gave")
- Maris (ܡܵܪܝܼ, mārī)
- Abdias (ܥܲܒ݂ܕܵܐ, ˁavdā, "servant")
- Berhadbesciaba (ܒܲܪܚܲܕ݂ܒܫܲܒܵܐ, bar-ḥaḏ-b-šabbā, "son of Sunday")
- Han (ܥܲܢܝܼ, ˁannī)
- Simeon (ܫܸܡܥܘܿܢ, šemˁōn, "Simon")
- Maris (ܡܵܪܝܼ, mārī)

Monks (6)

- Papa (ܦܵܦܵܐ, pāpā, "father")
- Evolesus (ܐܘܠܫ, ōlāš)
- Ebedjesu (ܥܲܒ݂ܕܝܼܫܘܿܥ, ˁavdīšōˁ, "servant of Jesus")
- Peqida (ܦܩܝܼܕ݂ܵܐ, pqīḏā, "commanded")
- Samuel (ܫܡܘܼܐܹܝܠ, šmūʾēl)
- Ebedjesu (ܥܲܒ݂ܕܝܼܫܘܿܥ, ˁavdīšōˁ, "servant of Jesus")

Unnamed virgins (7).

== Sources ==
- Fr. Joseph Irvin Vespers: Orthodox Service Books - Number 6. Lulu Press, Inc, 28 September 2017.
- Fr. Joseph Irvin The Divine Liturgy of St. John Chrysostom: Orthodox Service Books - Number 1, Lulu Press, Inc, 8 July 2017.
