= Chronological list of saints in the 5th century =

A list of people, who died during the 5th century, who have received recognition as Blessed (through beatification) or Saint (through canonization) from the Catholic Church:

Name	Birth	Birthplace	Death	Place of death	Notes
Pope Anastasius I			401		Bishop of Rome
Julius of Novara			401		
Alexander Akimetes			403		
Epiphanius of Salamis	315		403		Bishop of Constantia
Severin of Cologne			403		Bishop of Cologne
Delphinus of Bordeaux	380		404		Bishop of Bordeaux
Isidore of Alexandria	334		404		
Maximian			404		Bishop of Bagae
Paula			404		
Victricius	330		404		Bishop of Rouen
John the Dwarf	339	Thebes, Egypt	405	Mount Colzim	Coptic desert father
Paul of Trois Chateaux			405		Bishop of Augusta
Vigilius			405		Bishop of Trento
Asella	319		404		
John Chrysostom			407		Bishop of Constantinople
Theotimos			407		Bishop of Tomi
Olympias	368	Constantinople	408	Nicomedia	
Venerius of Milan			409		Bishop of Milan
Anysius			410		Bishop of Thessalonica
Euphrasia (Eupraxia) of Constantinople	380		410		
Gaudentius of Brescia			410		Bishop of Brescia
Isaac of Constantinople			410		
Marcella			410		
Melania the Elder			410		
Pammachius			410		
Exsuperius			412		
Taurinus			412		Bishop of Évreux
Theodosius of Antioch			412		
Bassian			413		Bishop of Lodi
Marcellinus of Carthage			413		
Honoratus	330		415		Bishop of Vercelli
Maruthas			415		Bishop of Maypherkat
Nicetas	335		415		Bishop of Remesiana
Innocent I			417		Bishop of Rome
Amator (Amatre)			418		Bishop of Auxerre
Eustochium			419		
Dictinus			420		Bishop of Astorga
Hormisdas			420		
Jerome	345		420		
Porphyrius			420		
Sabinua			420		Bishop of Piacenza
Salvinus			420		Bishop of Verdun
Severinus (Seurin)			420		Bishop of Bordeaux
Urbitius			420		Bishop of Metz
James Intercisus			421		
Boniface I			422		Bishop of Rome
Elpidius			422		Bishop of Lyon
Renatus (Rend)			422		Bishop of Angers
Eusebius of Cremona			423		
Marolus			423		
Venerandus			423		Bishop of Clermont
Benjamin			424		
Atticus			425		
Castor			425		Bishop of Apt
Theonestus			425		Bishop of Philippi
Theophilus of Brescia			427		Bishop of Brescia
Felix of Bologna			429		Bishop of Bologna
Honoratus			429		
James of Tarentaise			429		Bishop of Tarentaise
Alipius	360		430		Bishop of Tagaste
Augustine	354		430		Bishop of Hippo
Aurelius			430		Bishop of Carthage
Caprasius (Caprais)			430		
Macedonius of Syria (the Barley Eater)	340		430		
Quintian			430		
Amandus of Bordeaux			431		Bishop of Bordeaux
Paulinus	354		431		Bishop of Nola
Celestine I			432		Bishop of Rome
John of Naples			432		Bishop of Naples
Leontius of Fréjus			432		Bishop of Frejus
Ninian			432		Bishop of Whithorn
John Cassian			433		
John Angeloptes			433		Bishop of Ravenna
Maro			433		
Alexander of Arumentum			434		
Julian of Bologna			435		
Julia of Corsica	400		439		
Melania the Younger	383		439		
Orentius (Orens)			439		
Quodvultdeus			439		Bishop of Carthage
Amantius			440		Bishop of Como
Dalmatius of Constantinople			440		
Sixtus III			440		Bishop of Rome
Mesrop (Mesrob)	361		441		
Brice (Britius)			444		Bishop of Tours
Cyril	376		444		Bishop of Alexandria
Vincent of Lérins			445		
Proclus of Constantinople			446		
Rusticus of Clermont			446		Bishop of Clermont
Germanus of Auxerre			448		
Arsenius the Great	355		449		
Eucherius	380		449		Bishop of Lyon
Flavian			449		Bishop of Constantinople
Hilary	401		449		Bishop of Arles
Augustalus			450		Bishop of Gaul
Dulcidius (Dulcet, Doucis)			450		Bishop of Agen
Fraternus			450		Bishop of Auxerre
Hypatius	366		450		
Isidore of Pelusium			450		
John Calybites			450		
Loman			450		Bishop of Trim
Peter Chrysologus	400		450		Bishop of Ravenna
Petronius			450		Bishop of Bologna
Turibius			450		Bishop of Astorga
Tychon			450		Bishop of Amathus
Valerius			450		Bishop of Antibes
Armentarius			451		Bishop of Pavia
Cordula			451		
Odran			452		
Anianus (Aignan)			453		Bishop of Orléans
Maurilius			453		Bishop of Angers
Pulcheria	399		453		
Severian			453		Bishop of Scythopolis
Valerius			453		Bishop of Sorrento
Gaudiosus			455		
Severus			455		Bishop of Treves
Severus of Vienne		India	455		
Monessa			456		
Deogratias			457		Bishop of Carthage
Palladius			457		
Secundinus (Sechnall, Seachnall)			457		Bishop of Armagh
Valerian			457		Bishop of Abbenza
Anatolius			458		
Cilinia (Celine)			458		
Simeon the Stylite			459		
Arator of Verdun			460		Bishop of Verdun
Armogastes			460		
Baradates			460		
Conogon (Gwen, Albinus)			460		Bishop of Brittany
Maximin of Lerins			460		
Maximus			460		Bishop of Riez
Papinianus, Mansuetus, and Companions	453		460		
Valerian			460		Bishop of Cimiez
Vivian			460		Bishop of Saintes
Leo the Great			461		Roman pope
Rusticus			462		Bishop of Narbonne
Petronius			463		Bishop of Die
Prosper of Aquitaine	403		463		
Romanus of Condat	390		463		
Jucunda			466		
Prosper of Reggio			466		
Shenute	348		466		
Benignus (Benen)			467		Bishop of Ireland
Maximus			467		Bishop of Turin
Hilary (Hilarius)			468		Roman pope
Abundius of Como			469		Bishop of Como
Patrick			469		Bishop of Bayeux
Chromatius			470		Bishop of Aquileia
Gratus			470		Bishop of Aosta
Paternian			470		Bishop of Bologna
Marcian			471		
Auxentius of Bithynia			473		
Deodatus			473		Bishop of Nola
Dochow			473		
Euthymius the Great	378		473		
Amabilis			475		
Eutropius of Orange			475		
Gerasimus of the Jordan			475		
John of Chalon			475		Bishop of Chalon-sur-Saône
Thomais of Alexandria			476		
Mamertus (Mamertius)			477		
Lupus of Troyes (Loup)	383		478		Bishop of Troyes
Flosculus (Flou)			480		Bishop of Orléans
Lupicinus			480		
Paphnutius			480		
Patiens			480		Archbishop of Lyons
Ríoch			480		Bishop of Inisboffin
Sidonius Apollinaris	423		480		Bishop of Avernum
Tydfil			480		
Veranus			480		Bishop of Vence
Virgin Martyrs of North Africa			480		
Severinus of Noricum			482		
Simplicius			483		Roman pope
Aquilinus			484		
Denise, Majoricus, and companions			484		
Donation			484		
Liberatus and Companions			484		
Octovian			484		
Victorian, Frumentius and Companions			484		
Blessed African Martyrs	483		484		
Abraham of Clermont			485		
Florentius			485		
Jucundus			485		Bishop of Bologna
Vindemialis			485		
Calogerus ("the Anchoret")			486		
Censurius			486		Bishop of Auxerre
Cannatus			487		Bishop of Marseilles
Maughold (Macull, Maccaldus)			488		
Modestus			489		Bishop of Trier
Asicus (Ascicus, Tassach)			490		
Corentin of Quimper (Corentinus, Corentius, Cury)			490		Bishop of Cornouaille (now Quimper)
Faustus of Riez			490		Bishop of Riez
Monitor			490		Bishop of Orléans
Victurius			490		Bishop of Le Mans
Theodora of Alexandria			491		
Canog (Cenneur)			492		
Felix III			492		Roman pope
Daniel the Stylite	409		493		
Moelray (Moeliai)			493		
Patrick			493		Bishop of Ireland
Perpetuus			494		Bishop of Tours
Dominator			495		Bishop of Brescia
Pope Athanasius II of Alexandria			496		Coptic pope
Epiphanius of Pavia	438		496		
Firminus of Metz			496		Bishop of Metz
Pope Gelasius I			496		Roman pope
Samuel of Edessa			496		
Volusian of Tours			496		
Tassach			497		Bishop of Rahoip
Apronia (Evronie)			500		
Domangard (Donard)			500		
Fibicius of Trier			500		Bishop of Trier
Georgia of Clermont			500		
Gunthiern			500		
Gwynllyw (Woollos, Gundleus)			500		
Habet Deus			500		Bishop of Luna
Honorata of Pavia			500		
Ia of Cornwall			500		
James the Syrian			500		
Marina the Monk			500		
Maturinus			500		
Odhran			500		First Christian martyr of Ireland
Valentinian			500		Bishop of Salerno

== See also ==
- Christianity in the 5th century
- List of Church Fathers
