= Amathus sarcophagus =

Sarcophagus from Ancient Cyprus

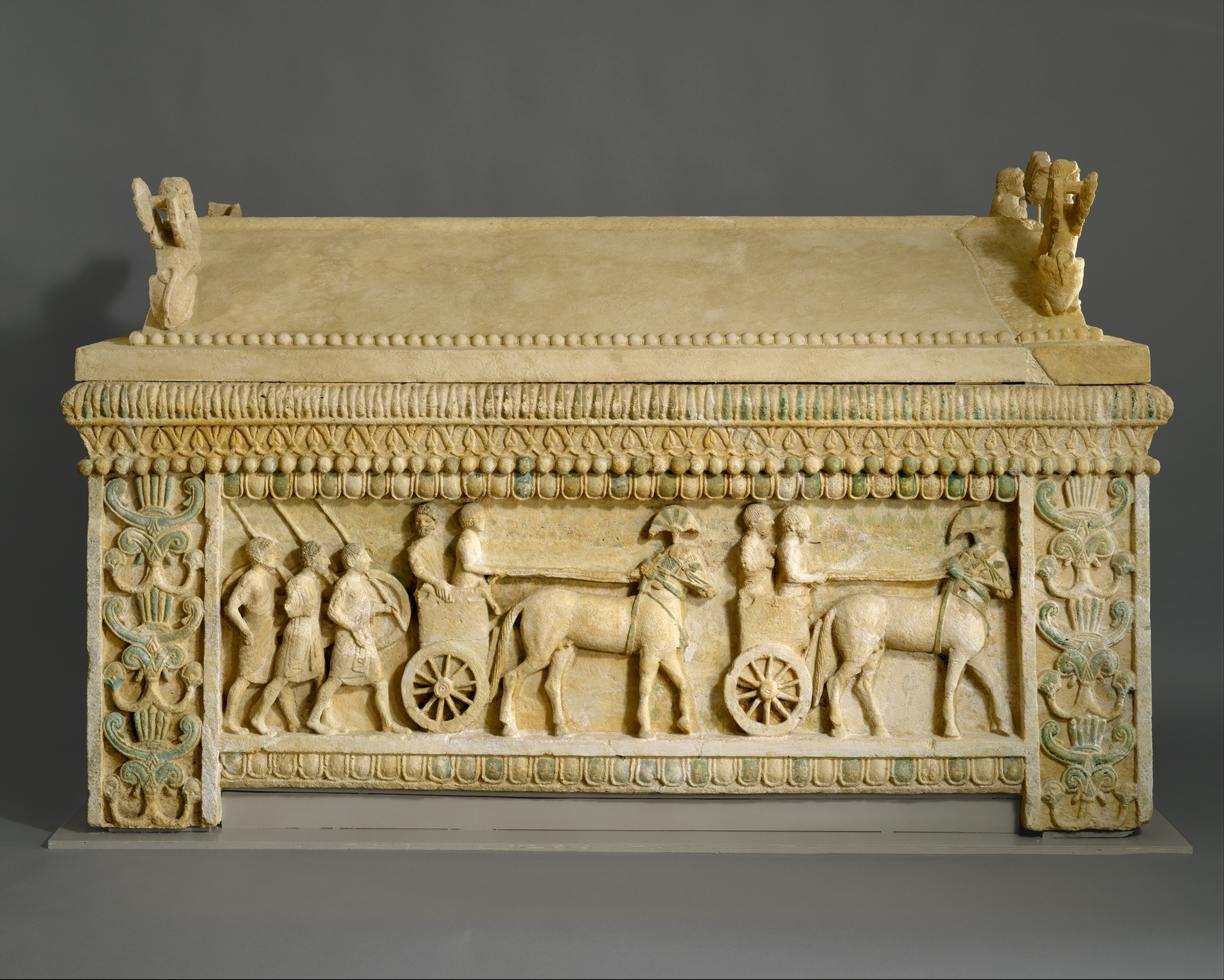

The Amathus sarcophagus is a Cypriot sarcophagus that likely held a king of Amathus. Its sides show procession scenes and typify Cypriot, Greek and Phoenician-Near Eastern styles of the mid-fifth century BCE. The sarcophagus was excavated by Luigi Palma di Cesnola and is currently located at the Metropolitan Museum of Art.

== General references ==
- Aruz, Joan; Seymour, Michael (2016). Assyria to Iberia: Art and Culture in the Iron Age. Metropolitan Museum of Art. pp. 259–. ISBN 978-1-58839-606-8.
- Gruen, Erich S. (2011). Cultural Identity in the Ancient Mediterranean. Getty Publications. p. 163. ISBN 978-0-89236-969-0.
- Hermary, Antoine; Mertens, Joan R. (2014). The Cesnola Collection of Cypriot Art: Stone Sculpture. The Metropolitan Museum of Art. pp. 366–. ISBN 978-1-58839-550-4.
- Konnari, Angel Nicolaou; Schabel, Chris (2015). Lemesos: A History of Limassol in Cyprus from Antiquity to the Ottoman Conquest. Cambridge Scholars Publishing. pp. 3, 26. ISBN 978-1-4438-8462-4.
- Schollmeyer, Patrick; Stylianou, Andreas (2007). Der Sarkophag aus Amathous als Beispiel kontaktinduzierten Wandels / Der Sarkophag aus Golgoi. Zur Grabrepräsentation eines zyprischen Stadtkönigs [The sarcophagus from Amathous as an example of contact-induced change / The sarcophagus from Golgoi. On the funerary representation of a Cypriot city king]. Forschungen zur phönizisch-punischen und zyprischen Plastik, vol. 2.2. Mainz: Zabern, ISBN 978-3-8053-3572-0.
