= Rathlin O'Birne =

Island in County Donegal, Ireland

Native name: Reachlainn Uí Bhirn
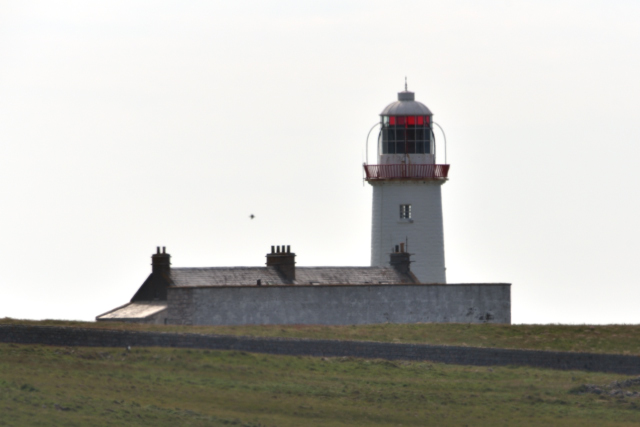
- Lighthouse on Rathlin O'Birne

- Location within island of Ireland

Geography
- Location: Atlantic Ocean
- Coordinates: 54°39.816′N 8°49.951′W

Administration
- Ireland
- Province: Ulster
- County: Donegal

Demographics
- Population: (1)

Rathlin O'Birne (Irish: Reachlainn Uí Bhirn) is an island located to the south west of the district of Glencolumbkille, County Donegal, Ireland, and 2 km west of Malin Beg.

== St. Assicus ==
Saint Assicus spent the last seven years of his life on Rathlin O'Birne. Assicus was the first Bishop (and subsequently the Patron Saint of Elphin, County Roscommon). Assicus was said to have been a favored follower of St Patrick and served as his goldsmith. The remains of Assicus's hermitage can be found on Rathlin O'Birne island.

== Lighthouse ==
Rathlin O'Birne lighthouse went into operation on 14 April 1856. In 1974, a radioisotope thermoelectric generator was installed, making it home to Ireland's first nuclear powered lighthouse. However, by 1987, the power output of the RTG had dwindled to an insufficient level and the lighthouse was converted to wind power, which was in use until 1991, at which point it was converted to solar power.

A road, with a cut stone wall on both sides, runs from the beach to the lighthouse to protect the lighthouse keepers as they made their way across the island.

== Accidents ==
- On 7 January 1975, the trawler Evelyn Marie sank on the west side ("the rock") of Rathlin O Birne with the loss of 6 crew.
- A year later, in November 1976, the trawler Carrig Una sank in the same spot with the loss of 5 crew.
- In July 2017, two men died when their RIB ran out of fuel close to the shore of Rathlin O'Birne, after having been rescued from the same area four weeks prior.
