= Amathus =

Ancient ancient city-kingdom of Cyprus and archaeological area

Amathus, Amathous
- Ἀμαθοῦς (Ancient Greek)
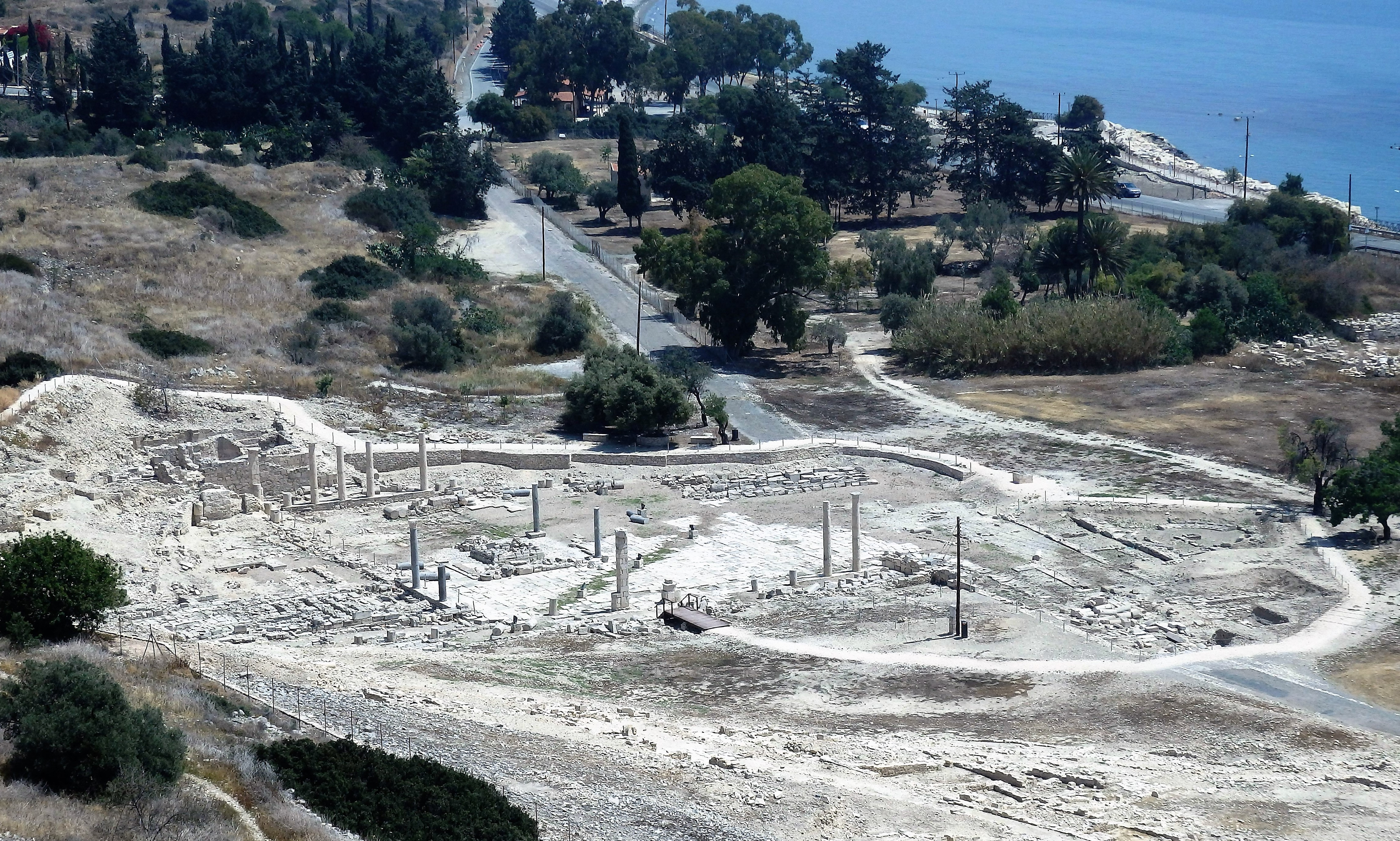
- The Agora of Amathus

- Location within Cyprus
- 34°42′45″N 33°08′30″E
- Location: Cyprus
- Region: Limassol District

Site notes
- Management: Cyprus Department of Antiquities
- Public access: Yes

Amathus or Amathous (Ancient Greek: Ἀμαθοῦς) was an ancient city-kingdom of Cyprus. It came under Ptolemaic rule in the 300s BC. Its ancient cult sanctuary of Aphrodite was the second most important in Cyprus—where her cult is thought to have originated—after Paphos.

Remains of Amathus can be seen today on the southern coast near Agios Tychonas, about 6 miles (9.7 km) east of Limassol and 24 miles (39 km) west of Larnaca. Archaeological fieldwork at the site continues; many finds are exhibited in the Limassol Museum.

== History ==
=== Pre-history and ancient era ===
Ancient kingdoms of Cyprus

The pre-history of Amathus survives in both myth and archaeology. No traces of human activity was detected in the site before the earliest Iron Age, c. 1100 BC, and no town is mentioned in the space between Kition and Kourion in the list of Cypriot cities from Medinet Habu. The city's legendary founder was Cinyras, linked with the birth of Adonis, who named the city after his mother Amathous. According to a version of the Ariadne legend noted by Plutarch, Theseus abandoned Ariadne at Amathousa, where she died giving birth to her child and was buried in a sacred tomb. According to Plutarch's source, Amathousians called the sacred grove where her shrine was situated the Wood of Aphrodite Ariadne. More purely Hellenic myth would have Amathus settled instead by one of the sons of Heracles, named Amathes (Ἀμάθης), thus accounting for the fact that he was worshiped there. Another ancient legend claims that the city was named after Amathusa, the mother of Cinyras.

It was said in antiquity that the people of Amathus were autochthonous, most likely Eteocyprian or "Pelasgian". Their non-Greek language is confirmed on the site by Eteocypriot inscriptions in the Cypriot syllabary which alone in the Aegean survived the Bronze Age collapse and continued to be used down to the 4th century BC.

Amathus was built on coastal cliffs with a natural harbour and flourished at an early date, soon requiring several cemeteries. Greeks from Euboea left their pottery at Amathus from the 10th century BC. During the post-Phoenician era of the 8th century BC, a palace and port were constructed. The port served the trade with the Greeks and the Levantines. A special burial ground for infants, a tophet served the Phoenicians. A temple was built high on a cliff for the Hellenes, which became a worship site devoted to Aphrodite, in her particular local presence as Aphrodite Amathusia along with a bearded male Aphrodite called Aphroditos. The excavators discovered the final stage of the Temple of Aphrodite, also known as Aphrodisias, which dates approximately to the 1st century BC. According to the legend, it was where festive Adonia took place, in which athletes competed in hunting wild boars during sport competitions; they also competed in dancing and singing, to honour Adonis.

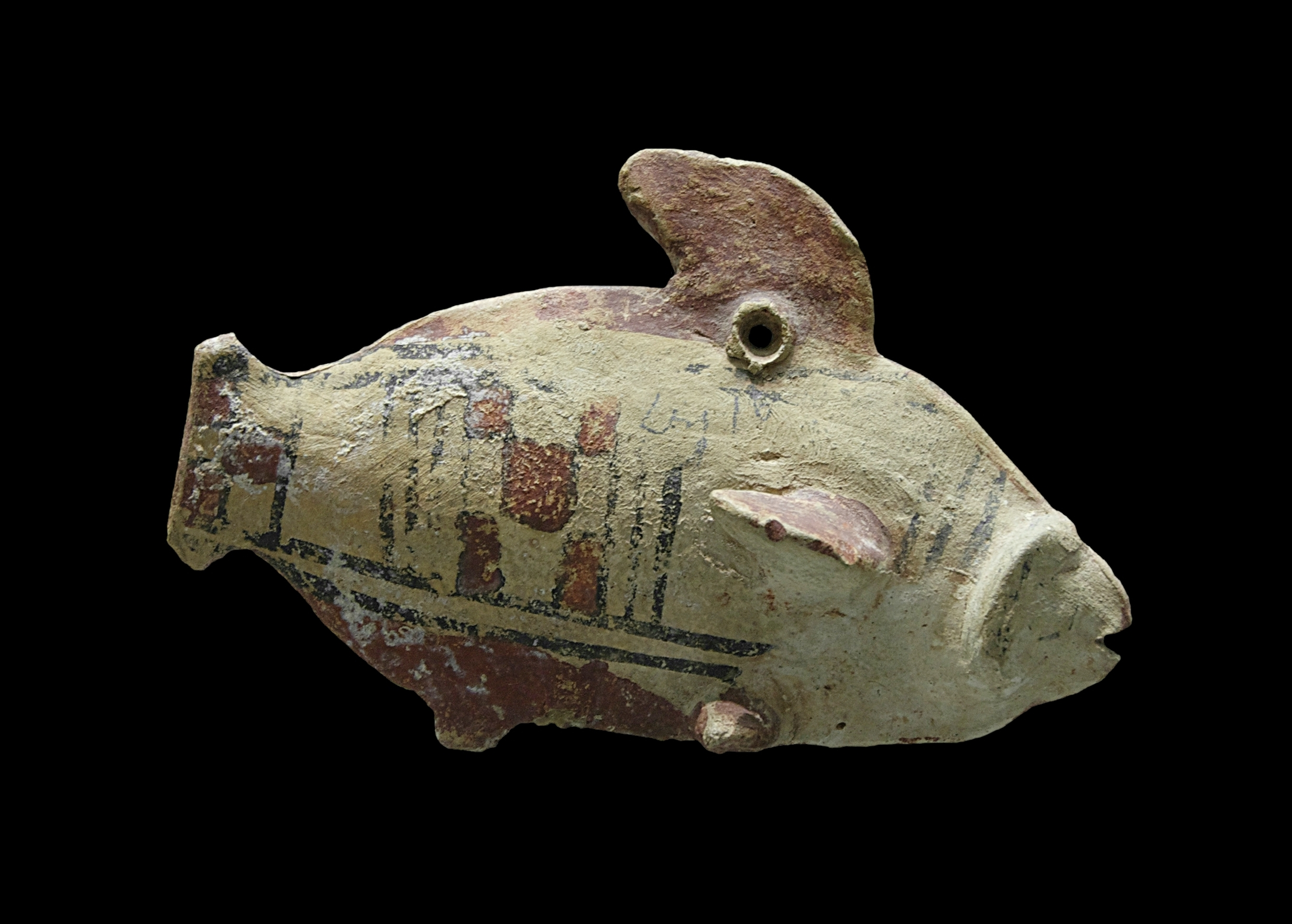
Fish, polychromic terracotta, 5th century BC, found in Amathus, depicting a grey triggerfish

The earliest remains found on the site are tombs of the early Iron Age period of Graeco-Phoenician influences (1000–600 BC). Amathus is sometimes identified with Qartiḫadasti (Phoenician "New-Town") in the Cypriote tribute-list of Esarhaddon of Assyria (668 BC) and some Phoenician inscriptions from the island, although others identify this Qartiḫadasti with Kition or a part of it. It certainly maintained strong Phoenician sympathies, for it was its refusal to join the philhellene league of Onesilos of Salamis which provoked the revolt of Cyprus from Achaemenid Persia in 500–494 BC, when Amathus was unsuccessfully besieged and avenged itself with the capture and execution of Onesilos. Herodotus reports

"Because he had besieged them, the Amathusians cut off Onesilos’ head and brought it to Amathous, where they hung it above the gates. As it hung there empty, a swarm of bees entered it and filled it with honeycomb. When they sought advice about this event, an oracle told them to take the head down and bury it, and to make annual sacrifice to Onesilos as a hero, saying that it would be better for them if they did this. The Amathusians did as they were told and still perform these rites in my day." (Histories 5.114)

Amathus was a rich and densely populated kingdom with a flourishing agriculture (grain and sheep) and copper mines situated very close to the northeast Kalavasos.

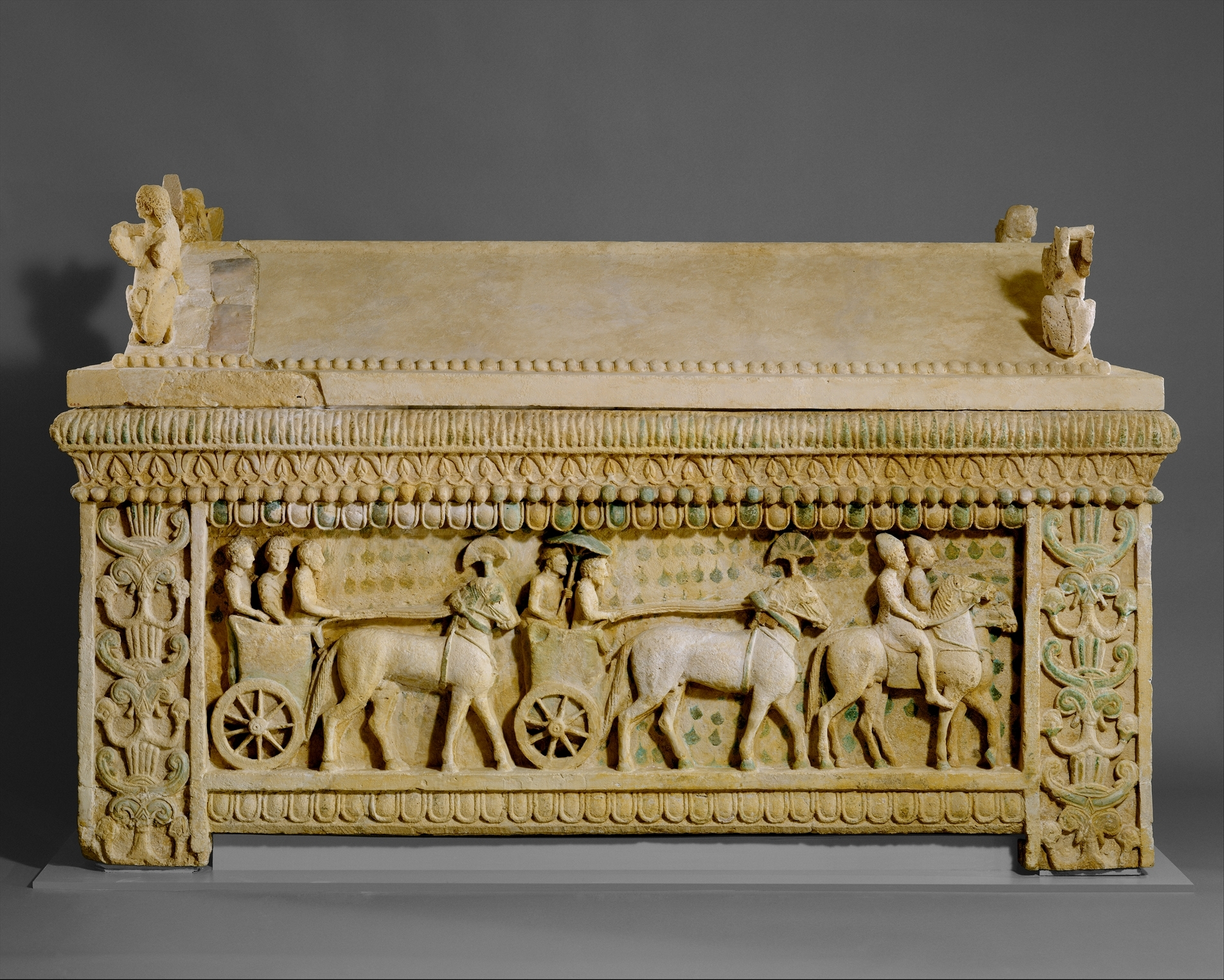
5th century BC Amathus sarcophagus found in Amathus integrates Greek, Eteocypriot and Oriental features

=== Hellenistic era ===
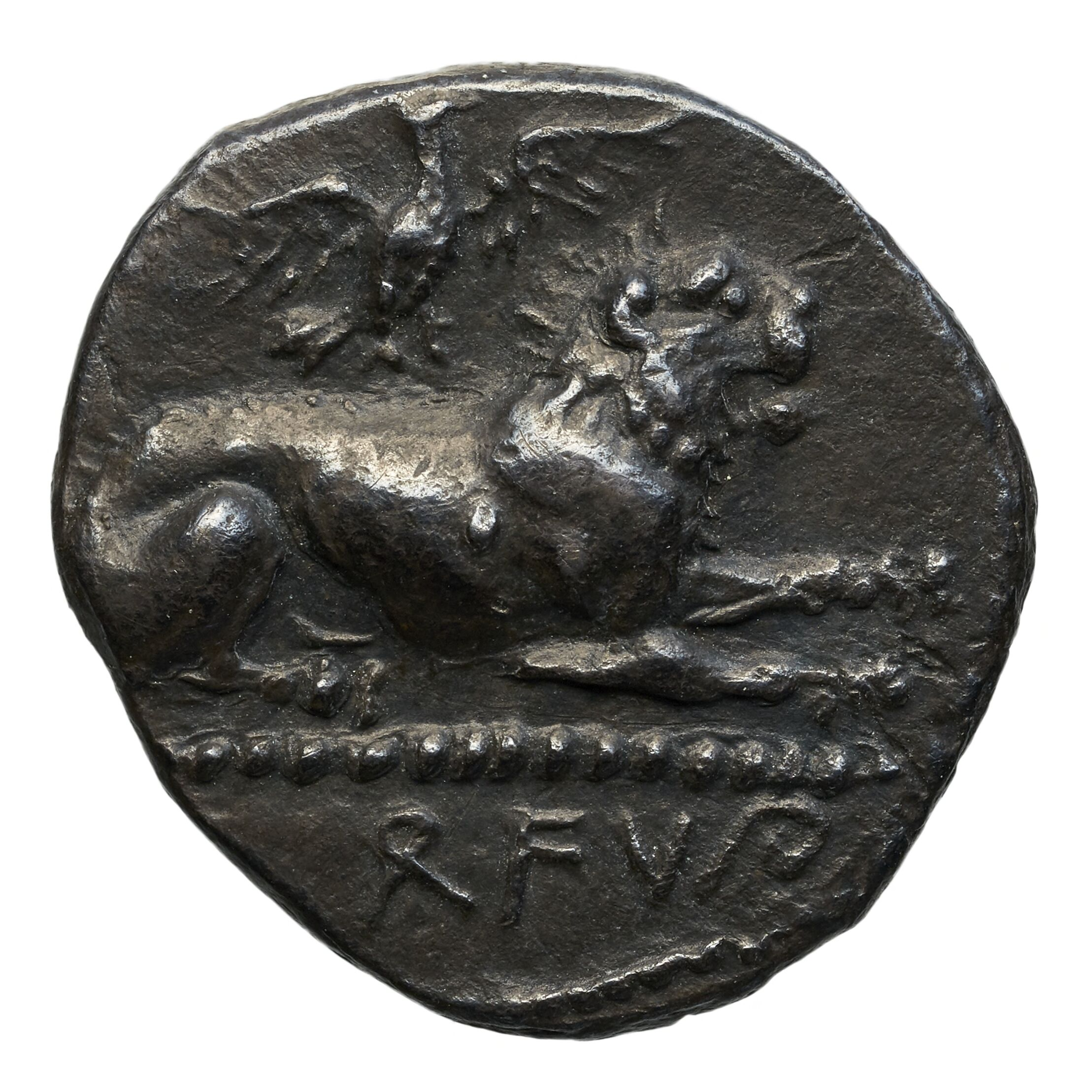
A coin of king Lysandros (𐠓𐠨𐠰𐠦 – lu-sa-do-ro) of Amathus

Around 385–380 BC, the philhellene Evagoras of Salamis was similarly opposed by Amathus, allied with Kition and Soli; and even after Alexander the Great the city resisted annexation, and was bound over to give hostages to Seleucus. Its political importance was over but its temple of Adonis and Aphrodite Amathusia remained famous in Roman times. The epithet Amathusia in Roman poetry often means "Cypriote," attesting to the city's fame.

From the 4th century BC the pedestals of two sculptures donated by the last Basileus of Amathous, Androkles, representing his two sons, Orestheus and Andragoras, have survived. Their inscriptions are in both Eteocyprian and Greek.

The decline of Amathus is often measured by the Ptolemaic gifts to Argos, where Amathus donated only 40 drachmas in 170–160 BC, but Kition and Salamis gave 208, Kourion 172, and Paphos 100. However, this figure contradicts the archaeologic evidence of new buildings in this period including a balneion, a bath, a gymnasium, as well as fortifications of the Acropolis, including a new tower. The port of Paphos appears to have lost traffic compared to Amathus in the Ptolemaic period, an indication that Paphos, as the capital of the island, perhaps offered fewer drachmas than the other cities for different reasons, like Amathus.

=== Roman era ===
In the Roman era Amathus became the capital of one of the four administrative regions of Cyprus.

A Roman temple was built in the 1st century AD on top of the Hellenistic predecessor. The temple facilities remained so important in Roman times that 'Amathusia' was used as a synonym for 'Cypriot'.

=== Late Antiquity and the Middle Ages ===
Later, in the 4th century AD, Amanthus became the see of a Christian bishop and continued to flourish until the Byzantine period. Of its bishops, Heliodorus was at the Council of Chalcedon in 451 and Alexander at the Second Council of Nicaea in 787. In the late 6th century, Saint Ioannis Eleimonas (John the Charitable) was born in Amathus and after 614 sent Theodorus, bishop of Amathus, to Jerusalem to ransom some slaves.

Today, Amathus is a see of the Church of Cyprus and is also listed (under the name "Amathus in Cypro", to distinguish it from "Amathus in Transjordan") as a titular see by the Catholic Church, which however, in line with the practice adopted after the Second Vatican Council, has made no appointments to the bishopric since the death of the last titular bishop of the Latin Church in 1984.

Anastasius Sinaita, the prolific 7th-century monk of Saint Catherine's Monastery, was born here. It is thought that he left Cyprus after the 649 Arab conquest of the island, setting out for the Holy Land, and eventually becoming a monk on Sinai.

Amathus declined and was already almost deserted when Richard Plantagenet took Cyprus in 1191. The tombs were plundered and the stones from the edifices were brought to Limassol to be used for new constructions. Much later, in 1869, a great number of blocks of stone from Amathus were used for the construction of the Suez Canal. A ruined Byzantine church marks its site.

=== In modern times ===
A new settlement close to Amathus but further inland, Agios Tychonas, is named after the bishop Tychon of Amathus. The site of the ruins is within the borders of this village, though the expansion of the Limassol tourist area has threatened the ruins: It is speculated that some of the hotels are on top of the Amathus necropolis.

== The site and archaeology ==
=== The Swedish Cyprus Expedition ===
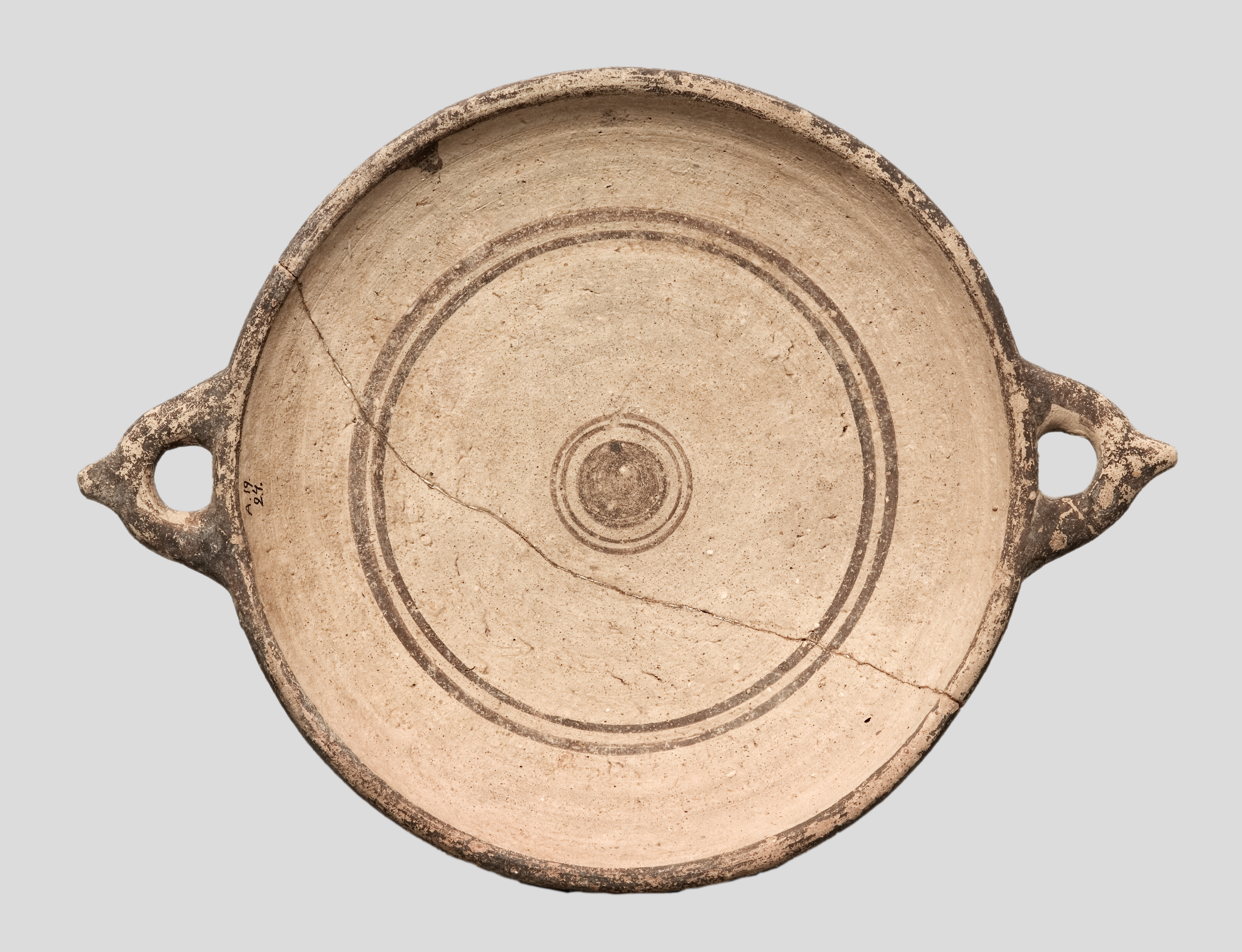
Bichrome III Plate.From tomb 19, Amathus. c. 1050 BC – c. 850 BC. Can be seen at Medelhavsmuseet.

From April to May 1930 the Swedish Cyprus Expedition excavated a necropolis on both sides of Amathus's acropolis. Amathus was known and visited during the 18th century and 19th centuries by travelers and archaeologists. Earlier excavators, such as General Luigi Palma Di Cesnola, the first American consul in Cyprus, excavated the necropolis's large tombs situated north of the acropolis and the tombs in the necropolis west of the acropolis hill. Since he did not publish any plans or drawings John Lindros illustrated two of the tombs from the old excavations that were still possible to visit. The necropolis had partly been excavated by the English Expedition to Cyprus in 1893–1894 and published in Excavations in Cyprus, London 1900. The Swedish Cyprus Expedition excavated around 25 tombs.

The inside of tomb 2, Amathus.

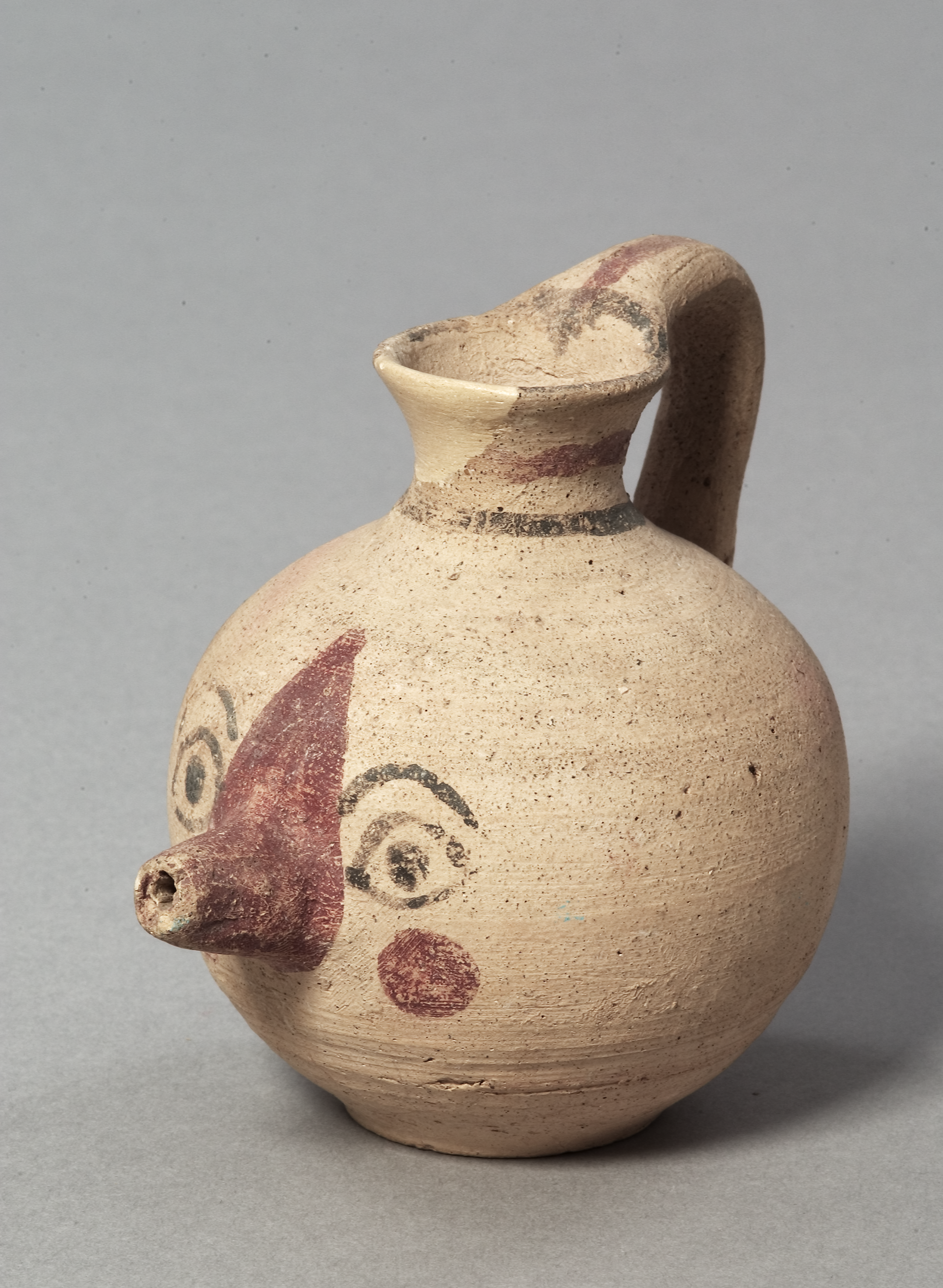
Feeding bottle from tomb 9, Amathus. c. 600 BC – c. 475 BC Can be seen at Medelhavsmuseet.

The tombs excavated are shaft tombs with a dromos, which are rather rare in Cyprus. Variations of the shaft tombs occur, mostly because of the various circumstances of space and economics as well as difficulties in cutting the rock. The archaeologist identified six different styles. It is the shape of the dromos that differ the most between the different styles. Tombs 1 and 2 differ from the others in the sense of construction and quality and might have been created for wealthier people, maybe royals. Tomb 3 is more reminiscent of the other graves found in Cyprus since it is a chamber tomb. Tomb 26 had a large tumulus and might have been related to other Hellenistic tumuli. It contained a stone pithos with an alabastron in which a burnt skeleton was found. Around the rim of the alabastron a wreath of gilded myrtle leaves was placed. The excavator thought it might have been a Ptolemaic official who died in Amathus and was buried according to a foreign burial custom.

Otherwise, the same burial customs were observed in most of the tombs. Many were reused multiple times, in which case the burial gifts were pushed into the corner of the tomb. Later, during the Hellenistic and Roman periods, Amathus was once again used for burial. These burials did not damage or alternate the earlier tombs since they were usually somewhere in the upper layers. The tombs are dated from the Cypro-Geometric I to the Roman period.

=== Later Excavations ===
The city had vanished, except for fragments of wall and a great stone urn in the acropolis, dating from the 6th century BC of which a similar vessel was taken to the Louvre in 1867. It is 1.85 m (6 ft 1 in) tall and weighs 14 tons. It was made from a single piece of stone and has four curved handles carved with bulls. In the 1870s, Luigi Palma di Cesnola excavated the necropolis of Amathus, as elsewhere in Cyprus, enriching the early collections of the Metropolitan Museum of Art; some objects went to the British Museum. More modern archaeological joint Cypriote-French excavations started in 1980 and still continue. The acropolis, the Temple of Aphrodite, the agora, the city's walls, the basilica and the port have all been excavated.

Further archaeological objects found during the excavations are preserved at both the Cyprus Museum in Nicosia and the Limassol District Archaeological Museum.

In the agora there are marble columns decorated with spirals and a huge paved squares. On the coastal side of the city there is an Early Christian basilica with mosaic floors decorated with semi-precious stones. Several houses built in a row dating to the Hellenistic period have been discovered near the terraced road leading to the temple, situated on the top of the cliff. At the east and west extremes of the city the two acropoleis are situated where a number of tombs have been found, many of which are intact.

Two small sanctuaries, with terracotta votive offerings of Graeco-Phoenician age, lie not far off, but the location of the great shrines of Adonis and Aphrodite have not been identified (M. Ohnefalsch-Richter, Kypros, i. ch.1).

== Gallery ==
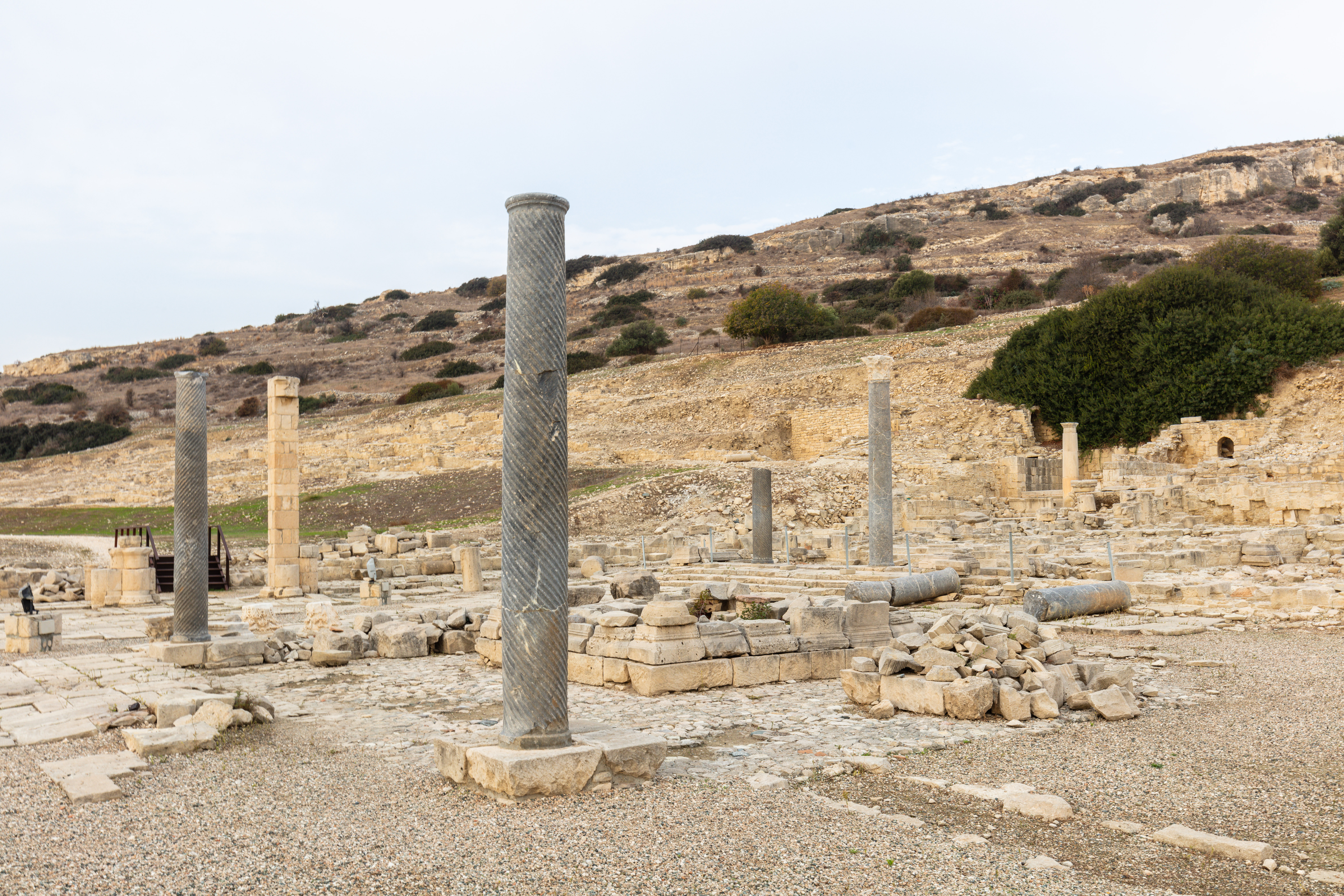
General view

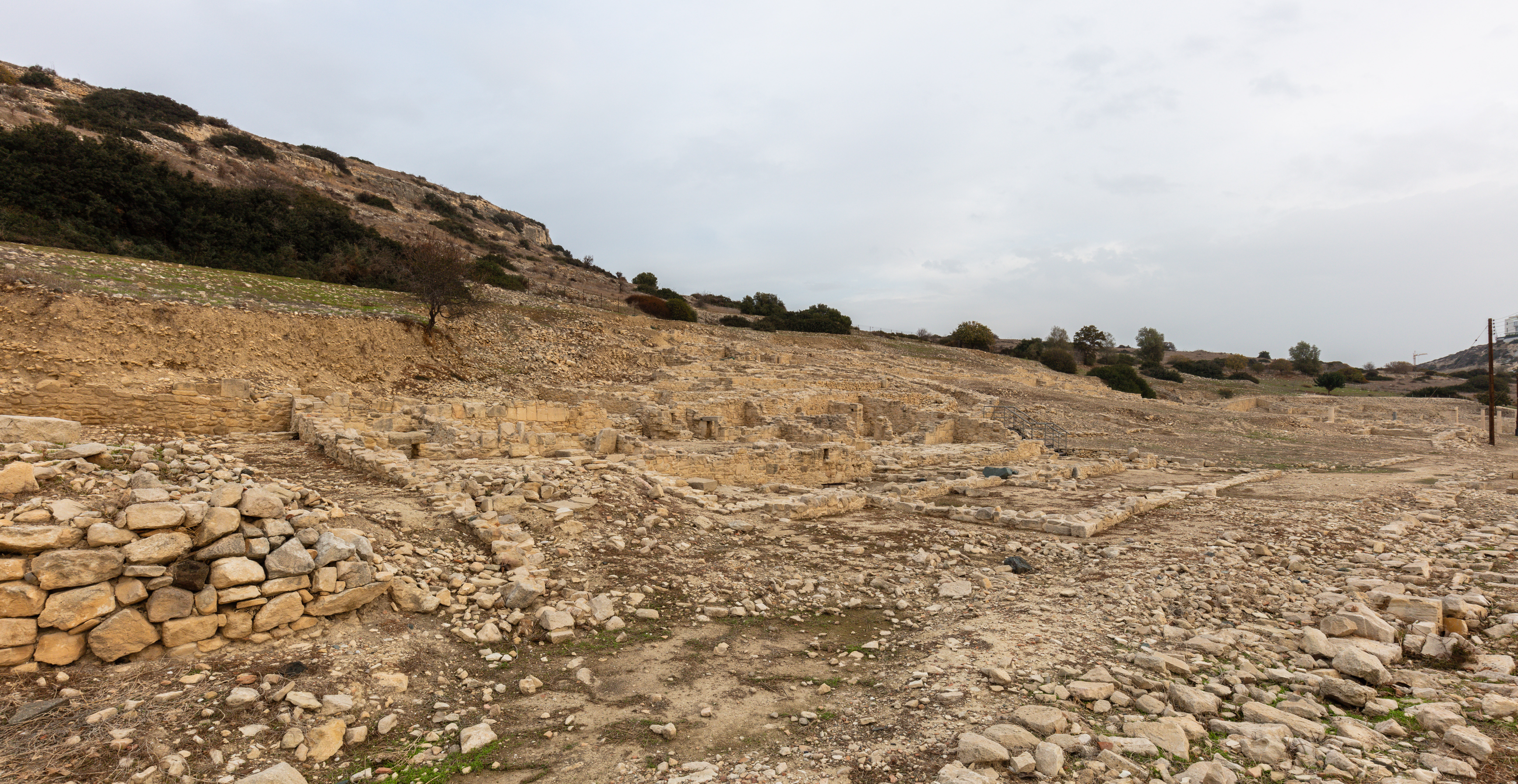
Remains of buildings

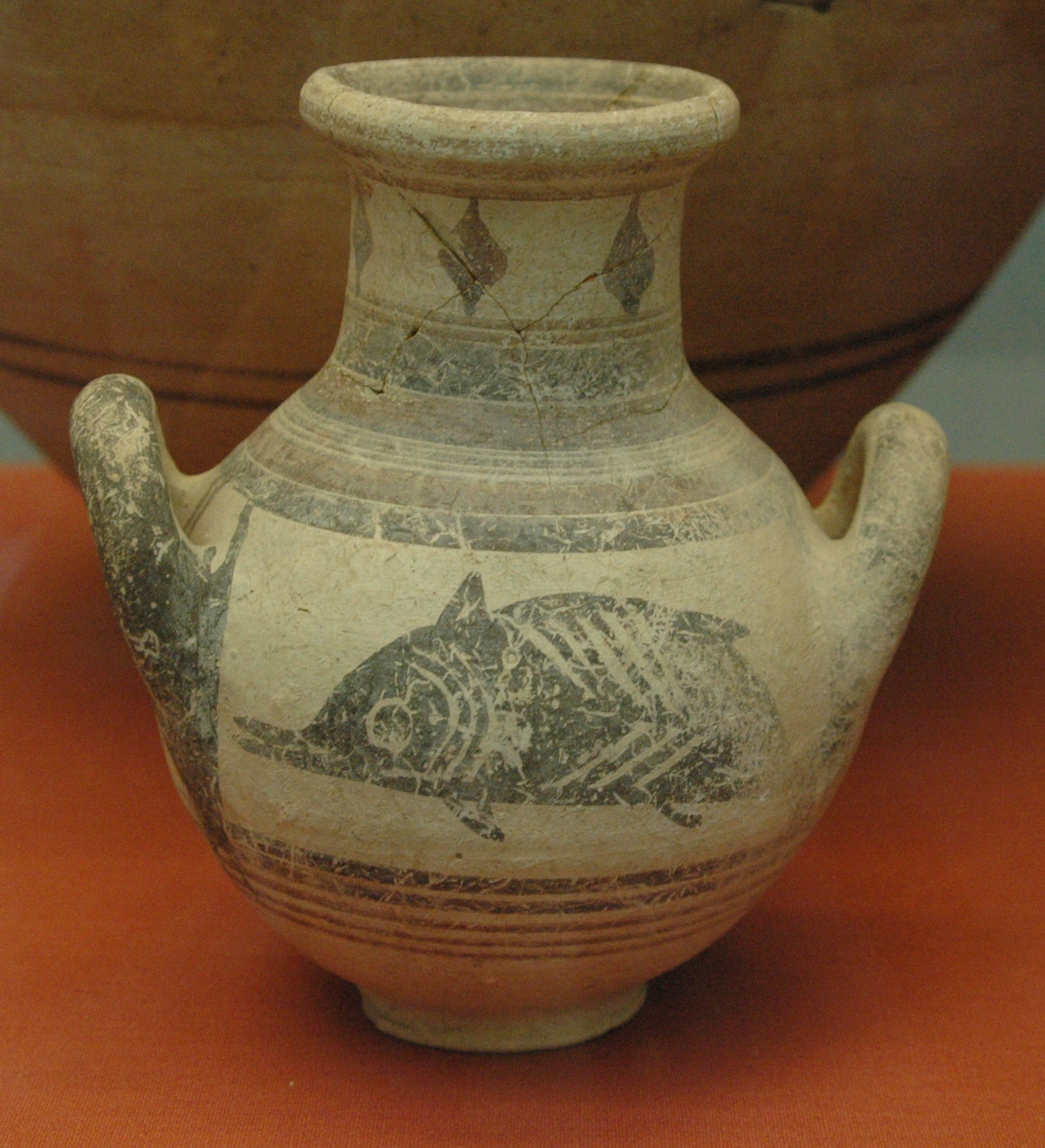
Amphora from tomb 52, Amathus, 6th century BC, British Museum

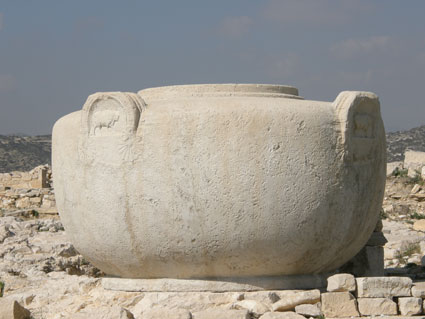
In-situ copy of massive stone vase (original in the Louvre)

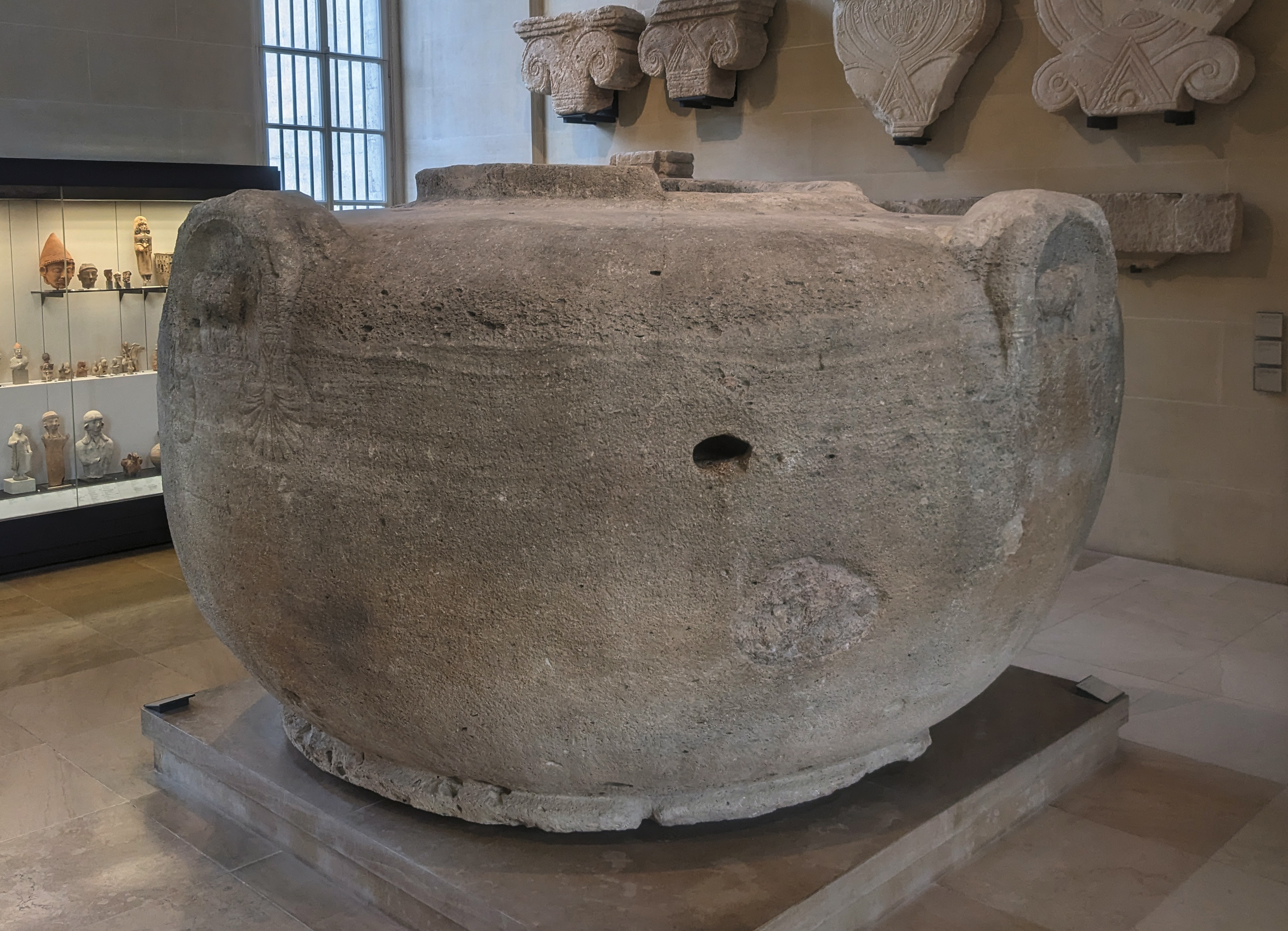
The original vase transferred in the Louvre
