= Saul Monastery =

Former Christian monastery located in Northern Ireland

- Sabhall Phádraig
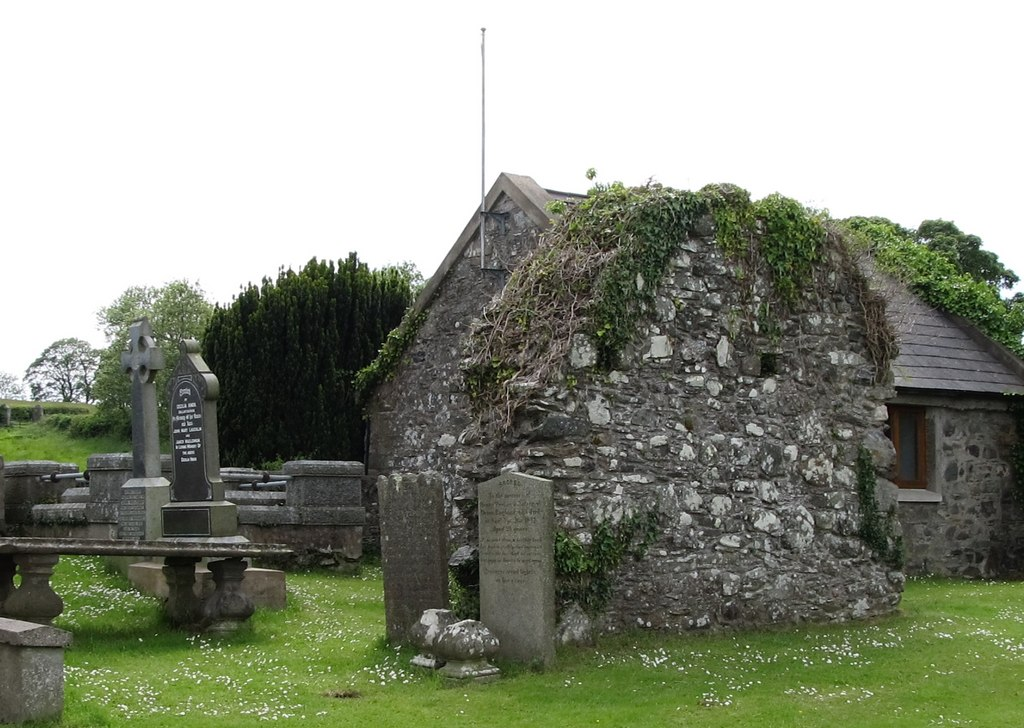

- Location within County Down Location within Northern Ireland Location within island of Ireland
- Interactive map of Saul Monastery

Monastery information
- Other names: Sabhull Padraig; Sabhul Padruic; Sepulturam Patricii; Baile itá Saball; an Sabhall; Horreum Patricii
- Order: Celtic monasticism Canons Regular of Saint Augustine
- Established: AD 432
- Disestablished: 1542
- Diocese: Down and Connor

People
- Founder: Saint Patrick

Architecture
- Status: ruined
- Style: Celtic monastic

Site
- Location: Saul, County Down
- Coordinates: 54°20′36″N 5°40′47″W
- Visible remains: ruined church, mortuary house, cross slabs
- Public access: Yes

Saul Monastery is a former Christian monastery located in County Down, Northern Ireland. It is traditionally associated with the 5th-century Saint Patrick, who is said to have founded it shortly after arriving in Ireland, and having died there at the end of his missionary work.

== Location ==
Found in the village of Saul, Saul Monastery is located 2.7 km (1.5 mile) northeast of Downpatrick; the River Quoile is 1.5 km (1 mile) to the northwest.

== History ==
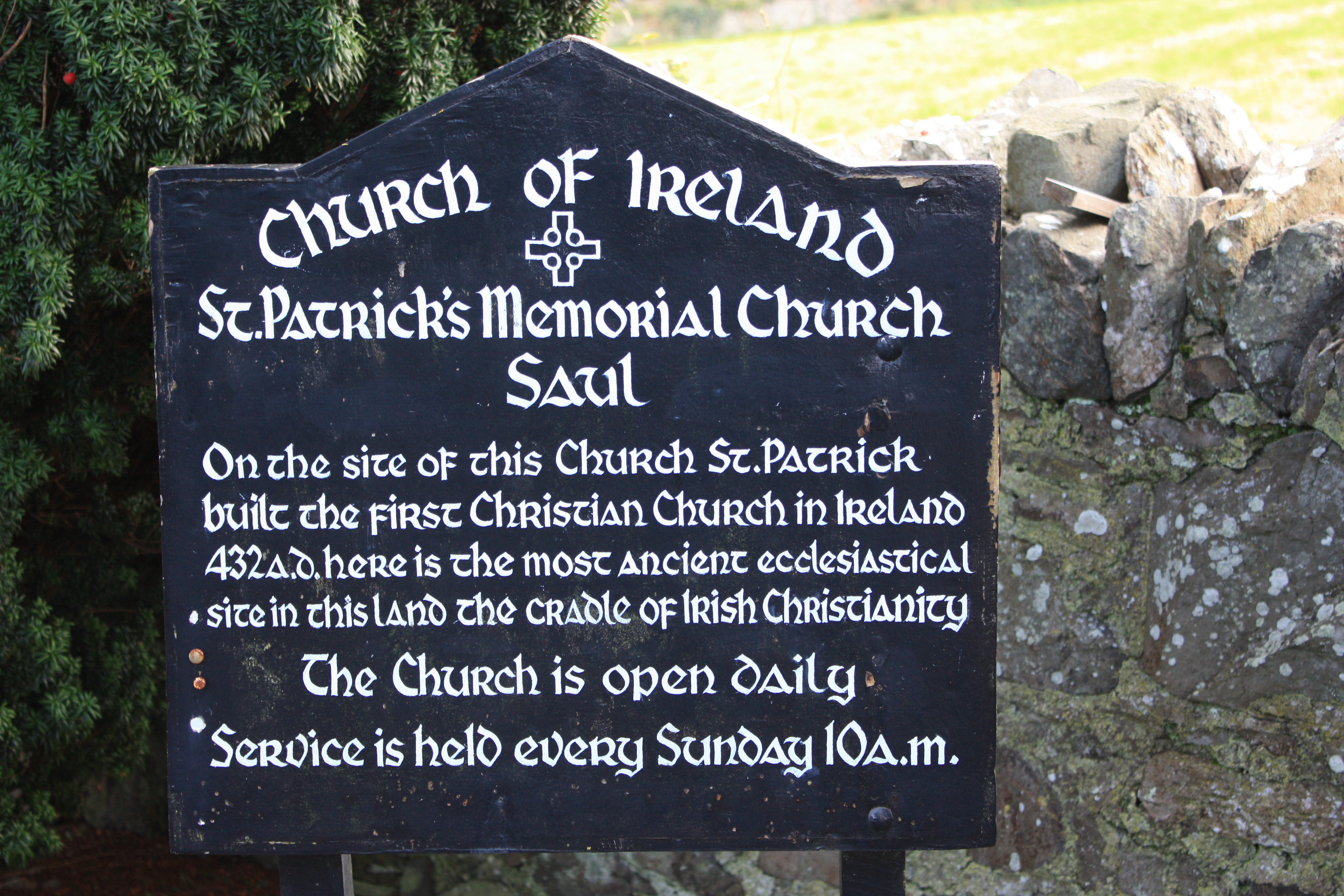
Informational sign, claiming Saul to be the site of the first Christian church of Ireland

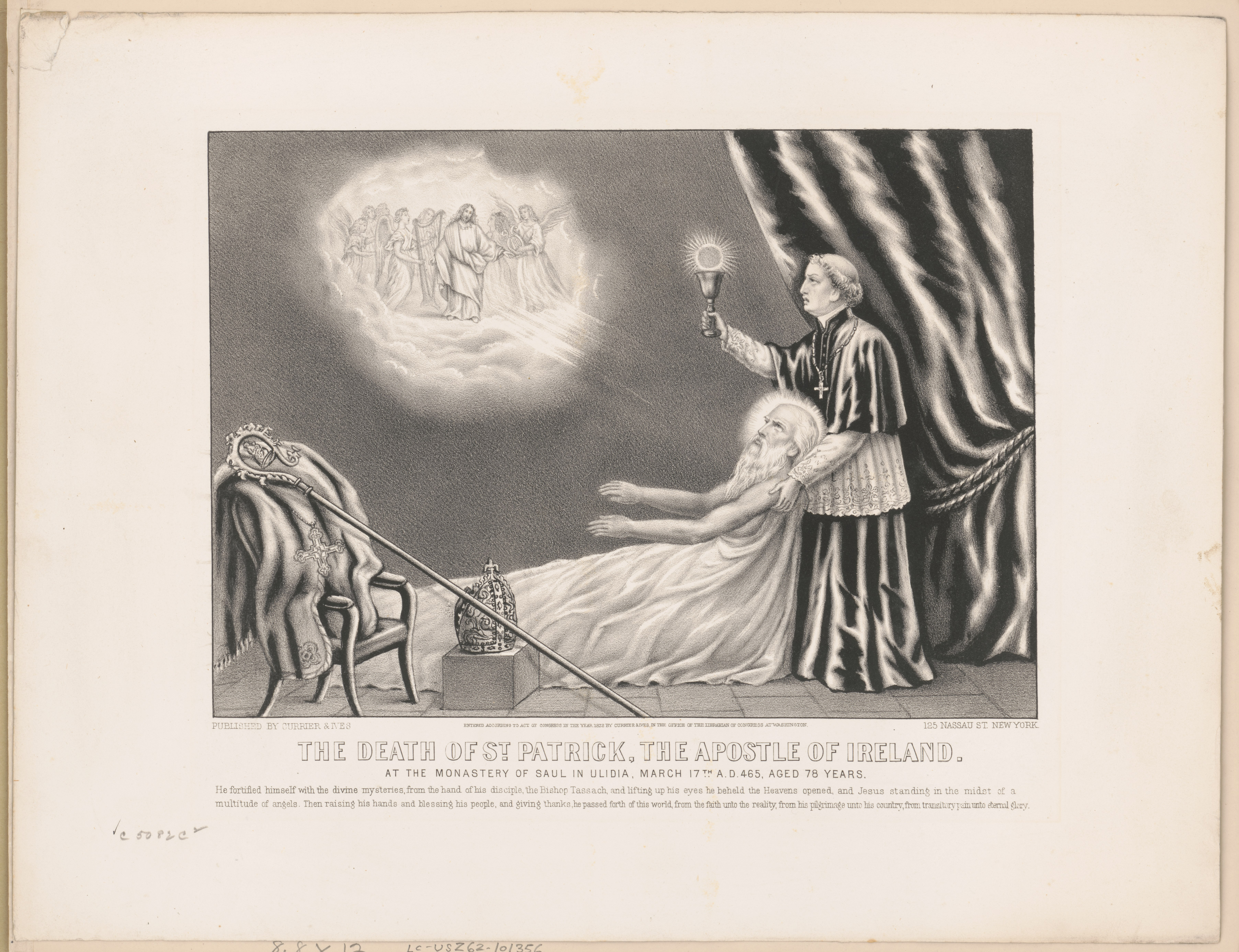
Drawing depicting "The Death of St. Patrick, the apostle of Ireland. At the Monastery of Saul in Ulidia." His disciple Tassac is with him, in anachronistic clerical garb.

According to tradition, the monastery was founded by Saint Patrick shortly after his arrival in AD 432; he landed via the nearby River Slaney and was granted a barn (Old Irish saball) by the local chieftain Dichu. He then placed it under the protection of Dunnius (Mo Duin).

It is the traditional site of death of Saint Patrick, who died at Saul on 17 March 465.

Saul Monastery survived for over three centuries before being destroyed by Viking raids.

The Annals of the Four Masters mention a "Ceannfaeladh of Sabhall, bishop, anchorite, and pilgrim" in 1011. A stone church was burned at Saul in 1020.

Some time after 1130 Saul was refounded as an Augustinian priory of Canons Regular by Saint Malachy; legend claims that he had a vision of the monastery before he constructed it. In 1164 Saul was plundered by Muirchertach Mac Lochlainn with the men of Fearnmhagh, the Cenél Conaill, and the Cenél nEógain. In 1170 a lengthy description of the expulsion of monks from Saul is given:

An unknown, atrocious deed was committed by Maghnus Ua hEochadha, King of Ulster, and the monk Amhlaeibh, son of the successor of Finnen, and by the Ulstermen in general,—except Maelisa, bishop, and Gilladomhangairt, son of Cormac, successor of Comhghall, and Maelmartain, successor of Finnen, with their people,—i.e. a convent of religious monks, with their abbot, whom Maelmaedhog Ua Morgair, legate of the successor of Peter, had appointed at Sabhall-Phadraig, were expelled from the monastery, which they themselves had founded and erected; and they were all plundered, both of their books and ecclesiastical furniture, cows, horses, and sheep, and of every thing which they had collected from the time of the legate aforesaid till then. Woe to the lord and chieftains who perpetrated this deed, at the instigation of one whom the monks of Drogheda had expelled from the abbacy for his own crime. Woe to the country in which it was perpetrated; and it did not pass without vengeance from the Lord, for the chieftains who had done this deed were slain together by a few enemies, and the king was prematurely wounded and slain, shortly after, at the town where the unjust resolution of perpetrating it had been adopted, namely, at Downpatrick. On Tuesday the convent were expelled. On Tuesday also, at the end of a year, the chieftains of Ulster were slain, and the king was wounded. On Tuesday, shortly after, he was killed by his brother, at Downpatrick.

In 1289 or 1293, Nicholas Mac Mail-Issu discovered the remains of Saints Patrick, Colum Cille and Brigid of Kildare at Saul; he placed them in a shrine. By 1296 Saul is described as greatly impoverished.

It was destroyed by Edward Bruce's armies during the Bruce invasion of Ireland in 1318. In 1380 a statute forbade any Gaelic Irish from becoming religious at Saul; only British settlers could. The seal of the Abbot of Saul was on a petition to King Henry IV c. 1410. At the dissolution of the monasteries, the abbey, with two castles, a garden and land were granted to Gerald FitzGerald, 11th Earl of Kildare in 1542.

A pattern took place at Saul on the second Sunday of June, "Saul Sunday."

== Buildings ==
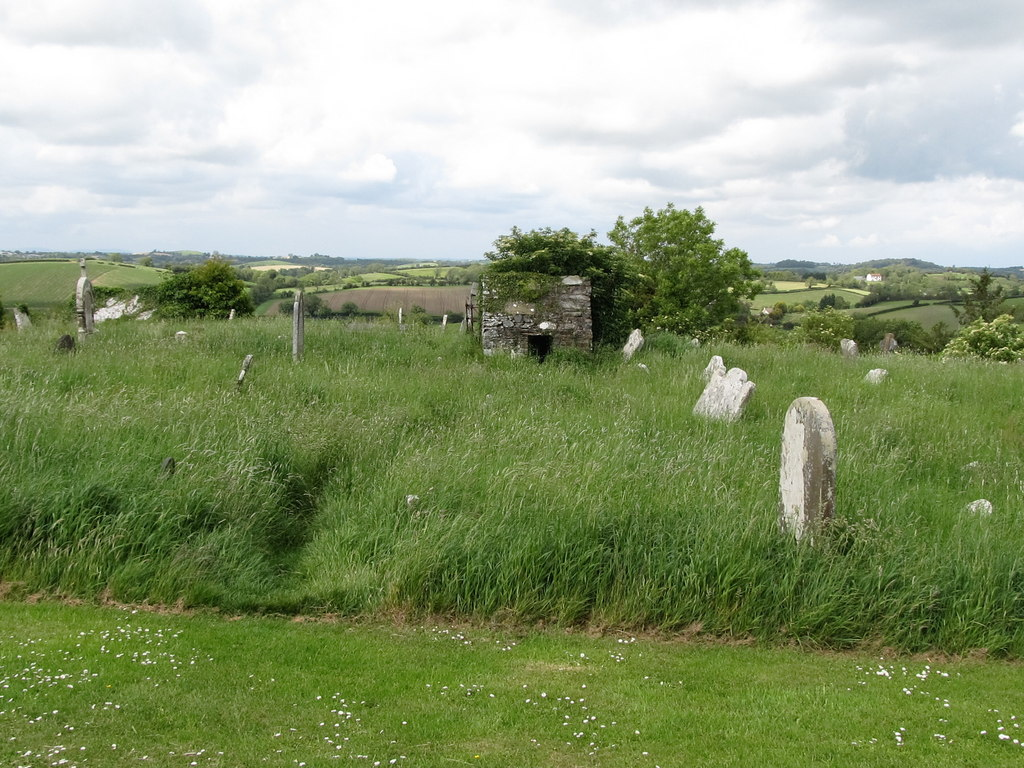
View of the old graveyard and "mortuary house"

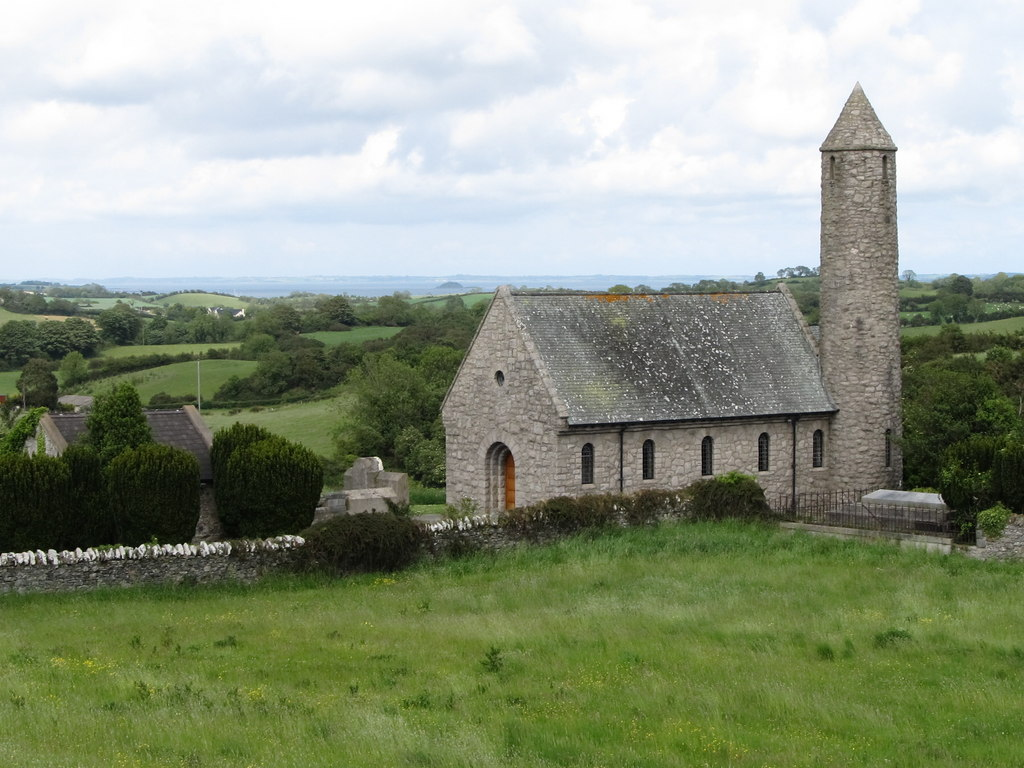
The 1933 church, with a modern round tower

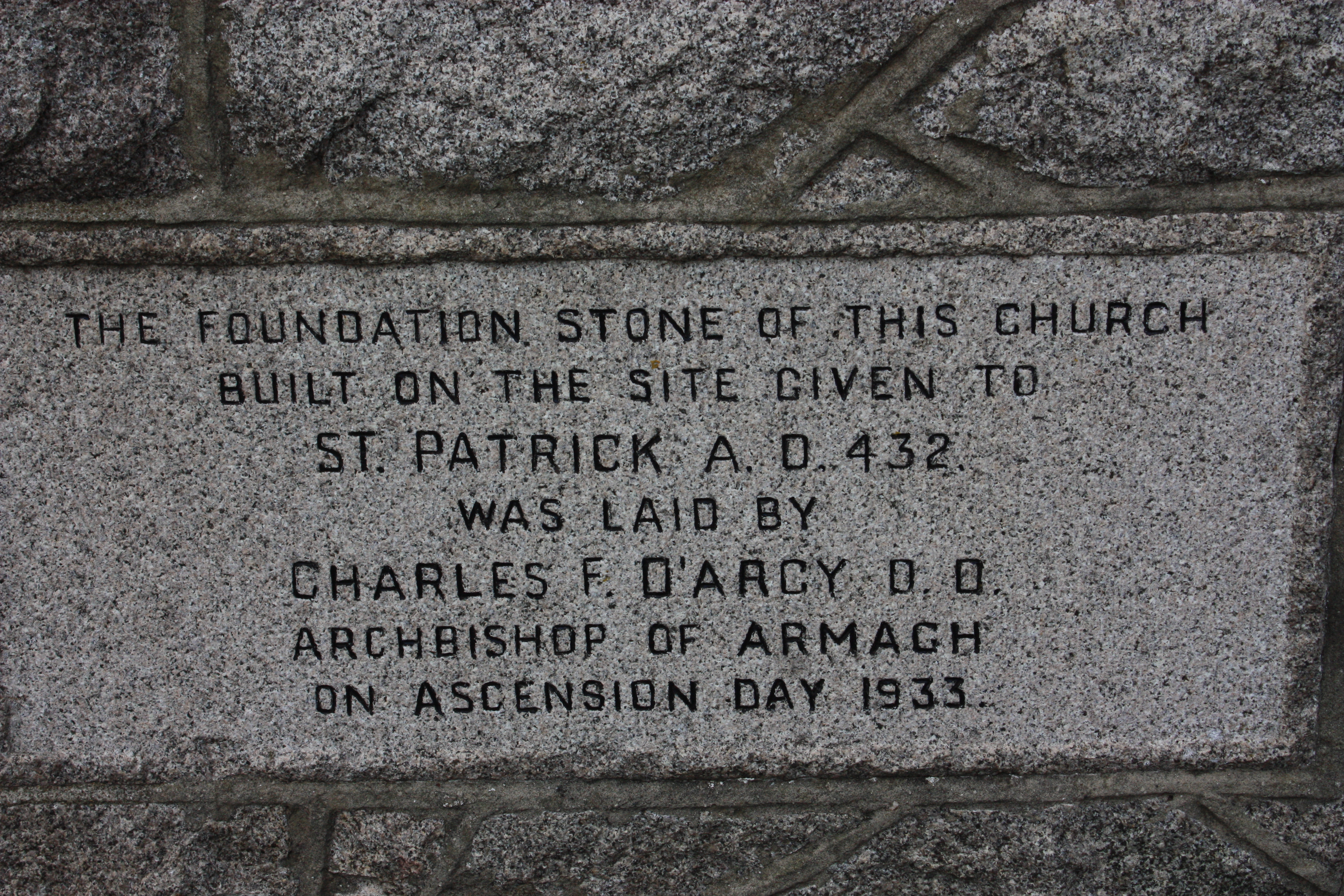
Foundation stone of the 1933 church

One wall of the Augustinian abbey remains, and a stone monastic cell (also called the "mortuary house") in the old graveyard. There is also a cross slab in the graveyard. Other gravestones have been moved to the Down County Museum.

The present Church of Ireland building was opened on All Saint's Day 1933; it replaced a simple 1788 structure.
