= Tassac =

Saint Tassac
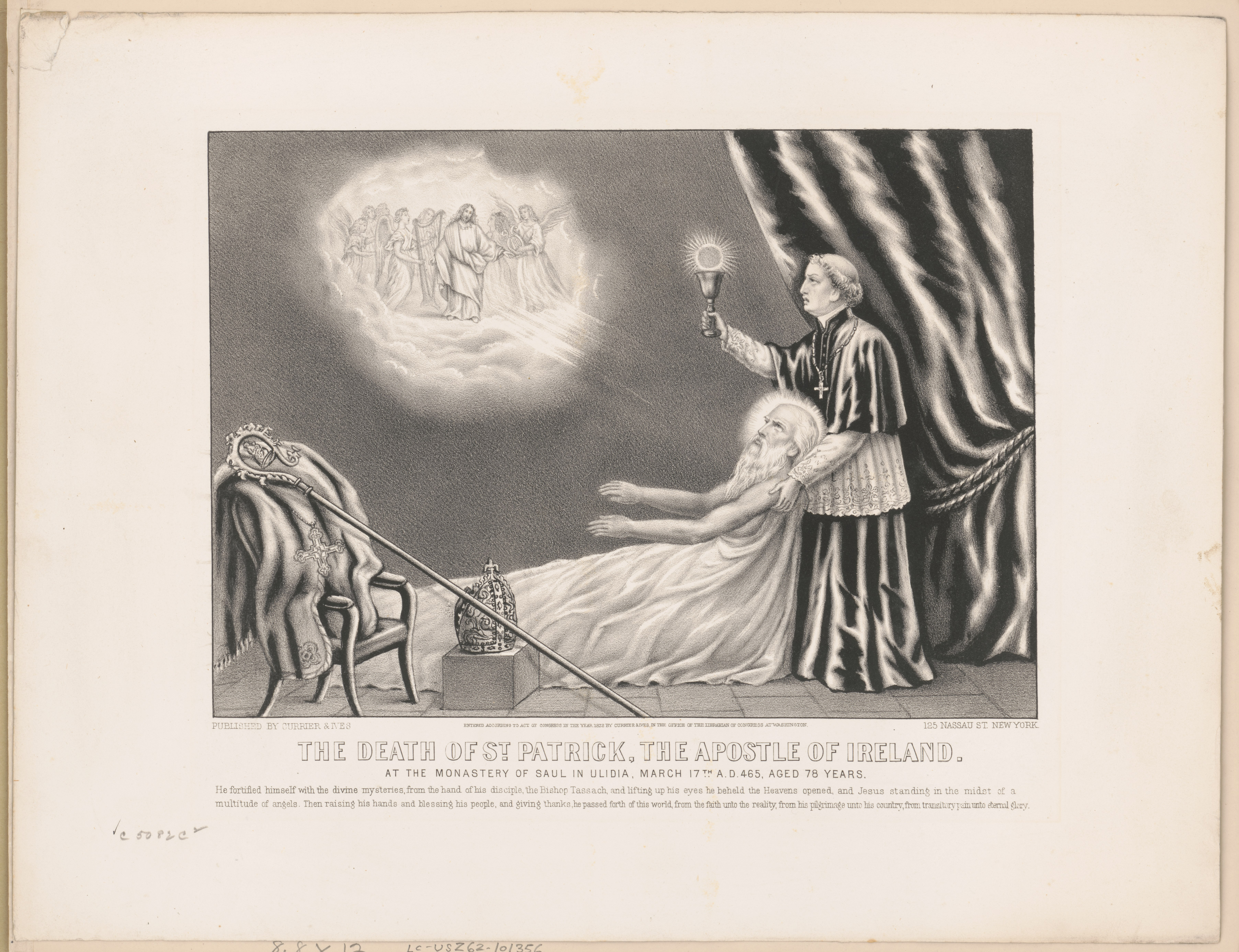
- Image of the death of Saint Patrick at Saul Monastery; Tassac performs the Last Rites.
- Died: c. 497 AD
- Honored in: Eastern Orthodox Church; Roman Catholic Church
- Feast: 14 April

Tassac (also Tassach; died c. AD 497) was an Irish saint, born in the first decade of the 5th century, died c. 497 and whose feast day falls on the 14 April.

== Life ==
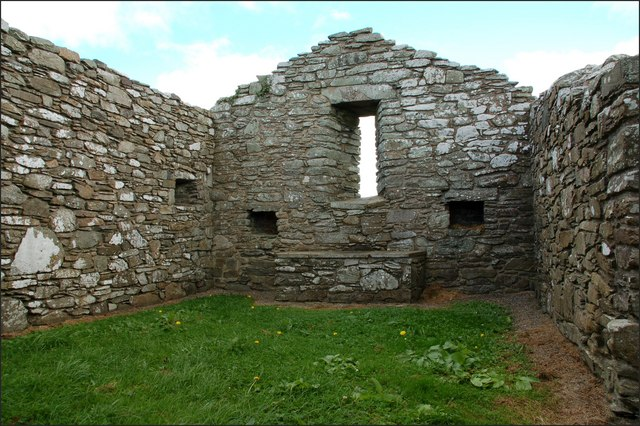
St Tassach's church in Raholp, near Downpatrick

He was one of Saint Patrick's disciples, and when Patrick founded the Church of St Tassach he placed Tassac in charge of it. The Church of Raholp was situated approximately 1 mile south of Saul on the Bannaghan Road in Raholp and was ultimately merged as a church into the Irish Diocese of Down (now the Diocese of Down and Connor). Some believe that the Church of Raholp was situated in Downpatrick, which is approximately 2.5 miles south south-west of Saul, but this is open to debate as the ruins of the original church building are to be found in Raholp. The remains of the church and adjoining lands are protected by law.

Tassac was a skilled artisan who made crosiers, patens, chalices, credences, shrines, and crosses for many of the churches founded by Patrick, but is remembered primarily for the fact that he was selected by Patrick to be with him in his last moments and to administer the Holy Viaticum to him. This event is chronicled in "The Martyrology of Donegal"; "Tassach of Raholp gave the Body of Christ to Saint Patrick before his death in the monastery of Saul".

Since the 19th century, Tassac has sometimes been confused, with Assicus of Elphin, County Roscommon, who had the same types of skill and is said to have died in the same year, and with Assam (or Assan).

== Prayer to Saint Tassac ==
Saint Tassac.

You were one of the first to follow Saint Patrick
and you administered the Holy Viaticum to him at the last.
Please be at my side when it is my turn to leave this earth and help me so that, like you, I will be with Christ forever.

Like Moses' disciples adorning the tabernacle,
you were a skilled artist and craftsman
and are now with Christ.
Please be at my side ensuring that whilst doing my daily chores you
ensure that I will always do as Christ requires from me.

== Raholp ==
In Raholp and the surrounding area numerous houses are named "Tassac", "Tassac mór" and "Tassac beag". Translated into English from the Irish Gaelic these are "Tassac", "Large (or Big)" Tassac" and "Small (or Little) Tassac".
