= Amathusia =

Ancient Greek mythological epithet

Amathusia or Amathuntia (Ancient Greek: Ἀμαθουσία or Ἀμαθουντία) was in Greek mythology a toponymic epithet of the goddess Aphrodite, which is derived from the city of Amathus in Cyprus, one of the most ancient seats of her worship. Her temple there remained famous in Roman times.
