= Tychon of Amathus =

Christian bishop

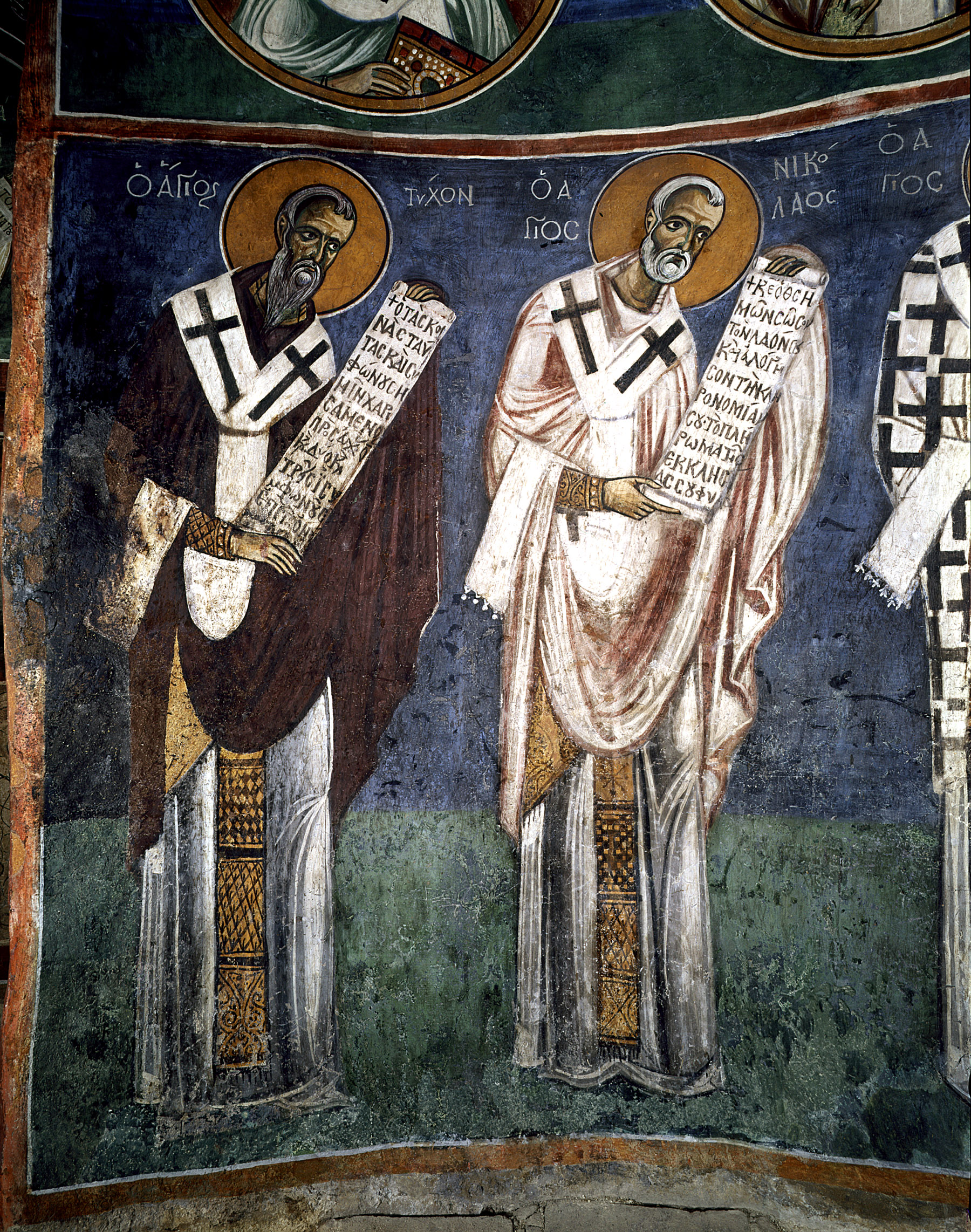

Tychon of Amathus (also Tychonas, Tikhon, Tycho, Greek: Άγιος Τύχωνας) (d. 425) was the Bishop of Amathus on the island of Cyprus. He is venerated as a saint by both Catholic and Orthodox Christians. His feast day is June 29 in the Gregorian calendar (equal to June 16 in the Julian calendar).

The village of Agios Tychonas, near the ancient ruins of Amathus, is named after Tychon.

Tychon's vita was written by John the Merciful, Patriarch of Alexandria, who was born in Amathus.
