= Euphrasia of Constantinople =

Christian saint

Saint Euphrasia
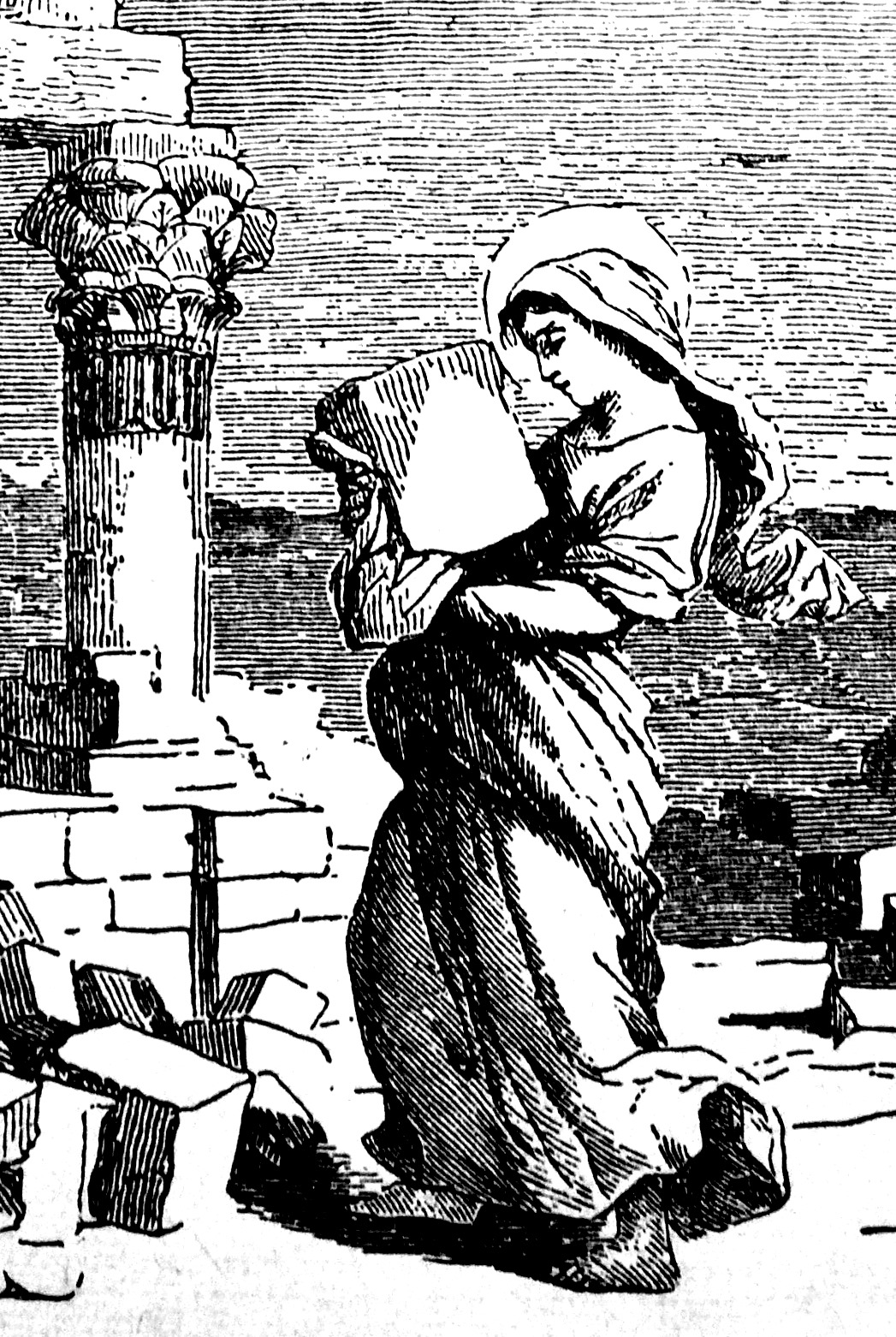
- Euphrasia carried heavy rocks as a penitential labor. From an 1878 book, Little Pictorial Lives of the Saints

Virgin
- Born: 380; Constantinople, Eastern Roman Empire (now Istanbul, Turkey)
- Died: March 13, 410 (aged 30); The Thebaid, Egypt
- Venerated in: Eastern Orthodox Church; Roman Catholic Church
- Feast: March 13 (Roman Catholic); July 25 (Eastern Orthodox)

Euphrasia (also, Eupraxia) (380 – March 13, 410) was a Constantinopolitan nun who was venerated after her death as a saint for her piety and example of charity.

== Life ==
Euphrasia was the only child of Antigonus—a senator and a nobleman of the court of Emperor Theodosius I, to whom he was related—and of a noble woman Euphrasia, his wife.After the sudden death of Antigonus, his widow Euphrasia withdrew with her young synonymous daughter to Egypt, near a monastery of one hundred and thirty nuns. This was less than a century since Anthony the Great had established his first monastery, but monasticism in that time had spread with incredible speed.

At the age of seven, Euphrasia begged to take vows and become a nun at the monastery. When her mother presented the child to the abbess, Euphrasia took up an image of Christ and kissed it, saying, "By vow I consecrate myself to Christ." Her mother replied, "Lord Jesus Christ, receive this child under your special protection. You alone doth she love and seek: to you doth she recommend herself." Soon after, Euphrasia's mother became ill and died.

Hearing of her mother's death, the Emperor Theodosius I sent for Euphrasia, whom he had promised in marriage to a young senator. She responded with a letter to the Emperor declining the offer to marry; instead, she requested that her estate be sold and divided among the poor, and that her slaves be manumitted. The emperor did as she requested shortly before his death in 395.

Another version of her biography states that Euphrasia was raised in the court of Theodosius, and that her mother joined the monastery; Euphrasia joined her as a child. The same version says that it was Theodosius' successor, Arcadius, that commanded her to marry the senator, but she was likewise permitted to remain a nun and give away her property.

Euphrasia was known for her humility, meekness, and charity; her abbess often advised her to perform manual labor when she was burdened with temptations. As a part of these labors, she often carried heavy stones from one place to another—once she did so for thirty days at one time. Euphrasia died in the year 410 at the age of thirty.

== Veneration ==
In Thebáide deposítio sanctæ Euphrásiæ Vírginis.
In Thebais, the death of St. Euphrasia, virgin.

— From the Roman Martyrology

Woodcut depicting Saint Euphrasia from the Wellcome Collection.

Saint Euphrasia of Constantinople as a hermit

Euphrasia was said to perform miracles before and after her death. For example, she is said to have healed a deaf, dumb and crippled child, and she delivered a woman from possession by the devil. Moreover, before she died, the abbess of Euphrasia's monastery reported having had a vision of Euphrasia transported to God's throne, surrounded by angels. After her death, she was venerated as a saint. In Western Christianity, her feast day is March 13, according to the Roman Martyrology reformed after the Second Vatican Council; in the Eastern churches, her veneration is celebrated on July 25.

== Bibliography ==
- Constantinou, Stavroula (2005). Female Corporeal Performances: Reading the Body in Byzantine Passions and Lives of Holy Women. Upsala. ISBN 91-554-6292-8.
- Constantinou, Stavroula (2022). "Same-gender friendships and enmity in the Life of Eupraxia *." In James, Liz; Nicholson, Oliver; Scott, Roger (eds.). After the Text: Byzantine Enquiries in Honour of Margaret Mullett. Routledge, pp. 218–232. ISBN 978-1-003-02175-9.
- Kirsch, Johann Peter (1909). "St. Euphrasia (Eupraxia)". The Catholic Encyclopedia. Vol. V. Robert Appleton Company. Retrieved June 2, 2010.
- Shea, John Gilmary (1894). Little Pictorial Lives of the Saints. Benziger Brothers.
- "St. Euphrasia of Constantinople." Catholic Online. https://www.catholic.org/. Retrieved June 2, 2010.
- "Venerable Eupraxia of Tabenna, in Egypt". Orthodox Church in America. https://www.oca.org/. Retrieved October 9, 2026.
