= Assicus =

Bishop of Elphin (fifth century)

Saint Assicus
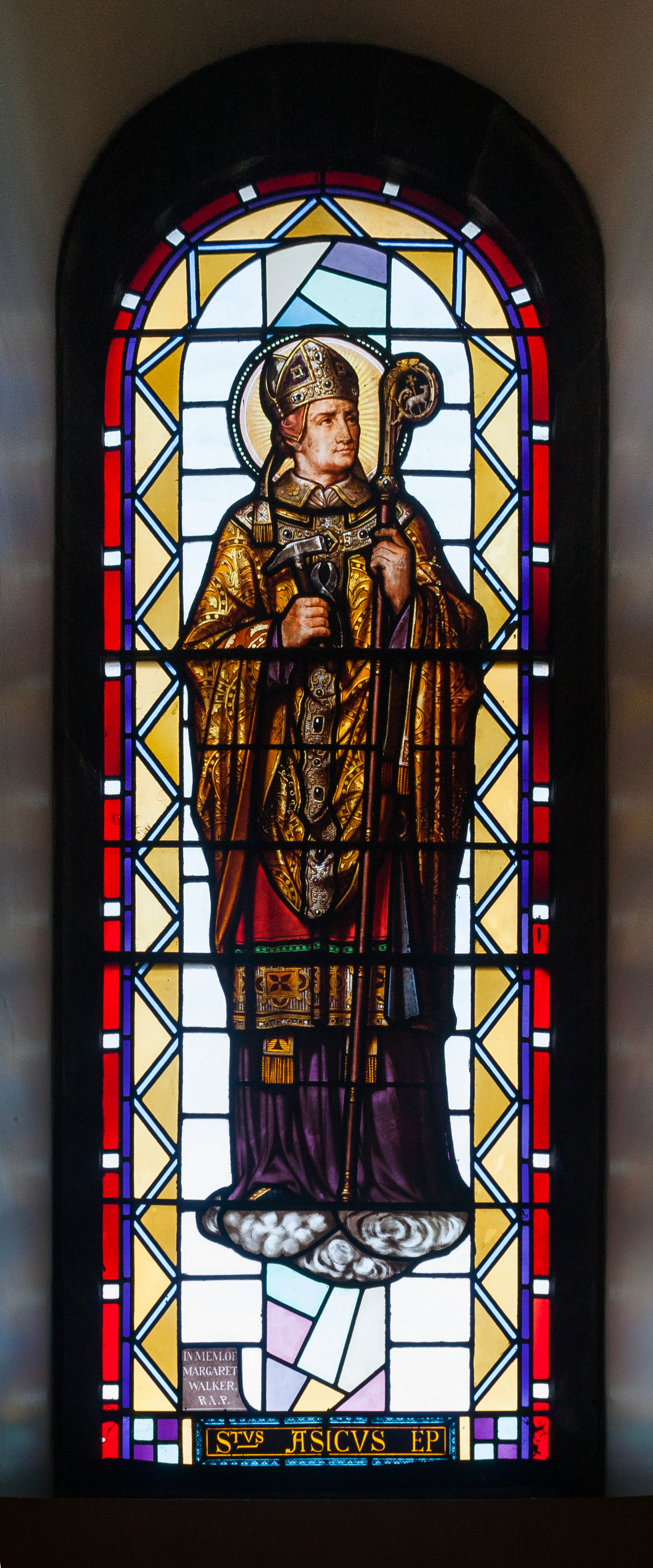
- Assicus in a stained glass window of Sligo Cathedral

Saint Patrick's coppersmith and Bishop of Elphin
- Born: unknown
- Died: c. 490; Racoo, Ballintra, County Donegal, Ireland
- Venerated in: Catholic Church, Eastern Orthodox Church, Anglican Communion
- Feast: 27 April
- Patronage: Elphin, Ireland

Assicus (Asicus, Assic) was the first bishop of Elphin, Ireland, and venerated as the patron saint of that place. He was also an artisan metalworker.

== Tradition ==
Assicus was a friend of St. Patrick, and a skilled metal worker in brass and copper. Converted to Christianity by Saint Patrick, he is also said to have been Patrick's worker in iron.

At Elphin, Patrick built a church, called through centuries, "Tempull Phadruig" (Patrick's church). There he established an episcopal monastery, one of the first monasteries founded by him. He appointed Assicus as abbot-bishop, and with him left Bite, son of the brother of Assicus, and Cipia, mother of Bite. Assicus was of the family of Hono, a druid of wealth and influence, from whom Patrick obtained the land.

== Artisan ==
Under the Brehon Law, craftsmen were well respected in ancient Ireland. The first bishop of Elphin is described in the Book of Armagh as the cerd (the wright or goldsmith) of St. Patrick. Assicus made chalices, patens, and metal book-covers for the churches founded by Patrick.

In the Tripartite Life of St Patrick is stated:

Bishop St. Assic was Patrick's coppersmith, and made altars, tables, and square bookcases. Besides, he made our saint's patens in honour of Bishop Patrick, and of them I have seen three square patens, that is, a paten in the Church of Patrick in Armagh, and another in the Church of Elphin, and a third in the great-church of Donough-patrick (at Carns near Tulsk).

Assicus was an expert metal worker, and was also renowned as a bellfounder. Following the example of their masters, the successors and spiritual children of St. Assicus founded a school of art and produced beautiful objects of Celtic workmanship in the Diocese of Elphin.

== Death ==
Of his last days the following graphic description is given by Archbishop Healy:

Assicus himself in shame because of a lie told either by him, or, as others say, of him, fled into Donegal, and for seven years abode in the island of Rathlin O'Birne. Then his monks sought him out, and after much labour found him in the mountain glens, and tried to bring him home to his own monastery at Elphin. But he fell sick by the way and died with them in the wilderness. So they buried the venerable old man in the churchyard of Rath Cunga, now Racoo, in the Barony of Tirhugh, County Donegal. The old churchyard is there still, though now disused, on the summit of a round hillock close to the left of the road from Ballyshannon to Donegal, about a mile to the south of the village of Ballintra. We sought in vain for any trace of an inscribed stone in the old churchyard. He fled from men during life, and, like Moses, his grave is hidden from them in death.

His feast is celebrated 27 April, as is recorded in the Martyrology of Tallaght under that date.

== Identities ==
Assicus is sometimes thought to be the same man as Tassac and Assam (or Assan), or both.
