= Saul, County Down =

Village in Northern Ireland

Coordinates: 54°20′38.13″N 5°40′28.29″W

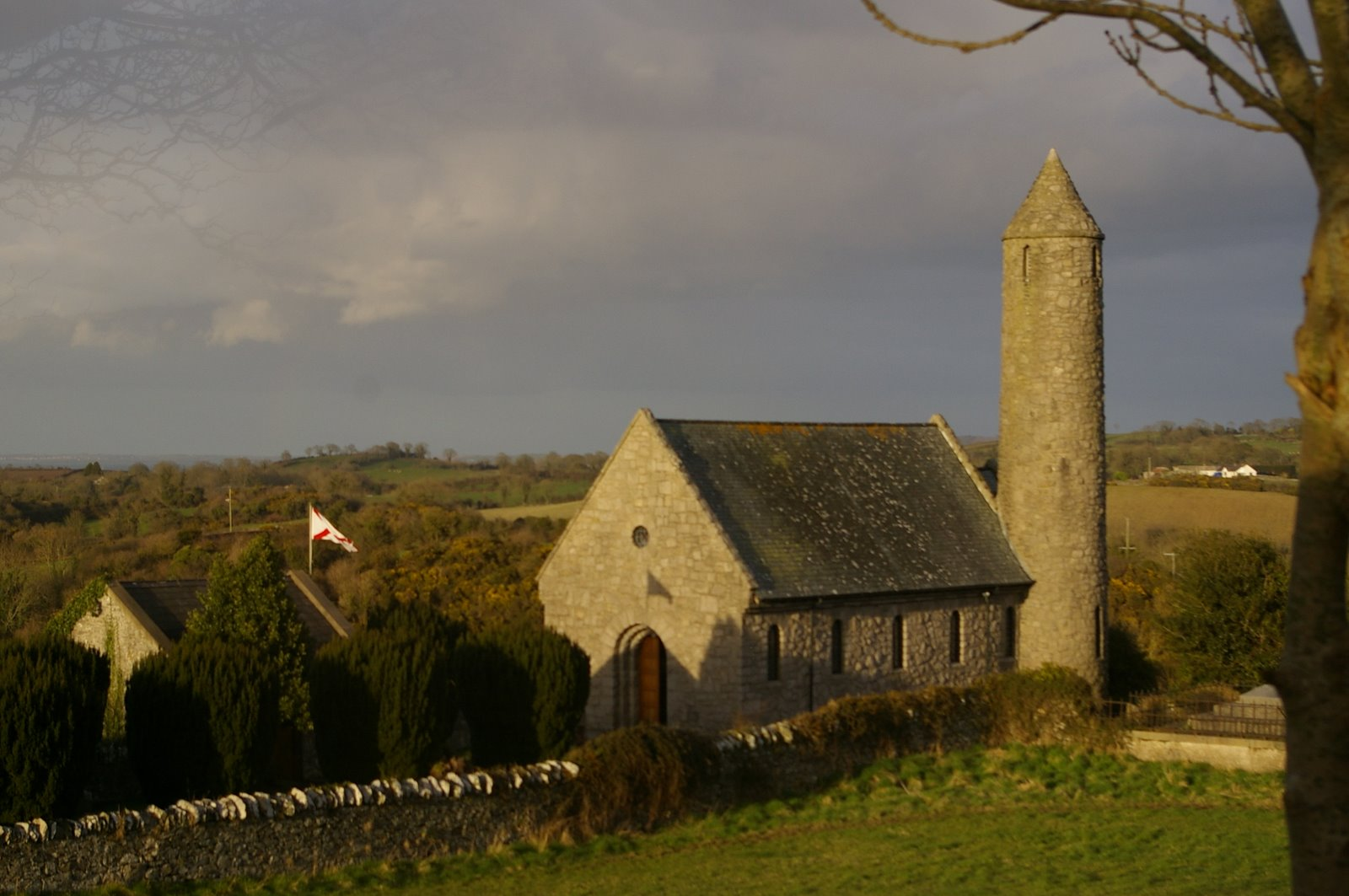
Saul church

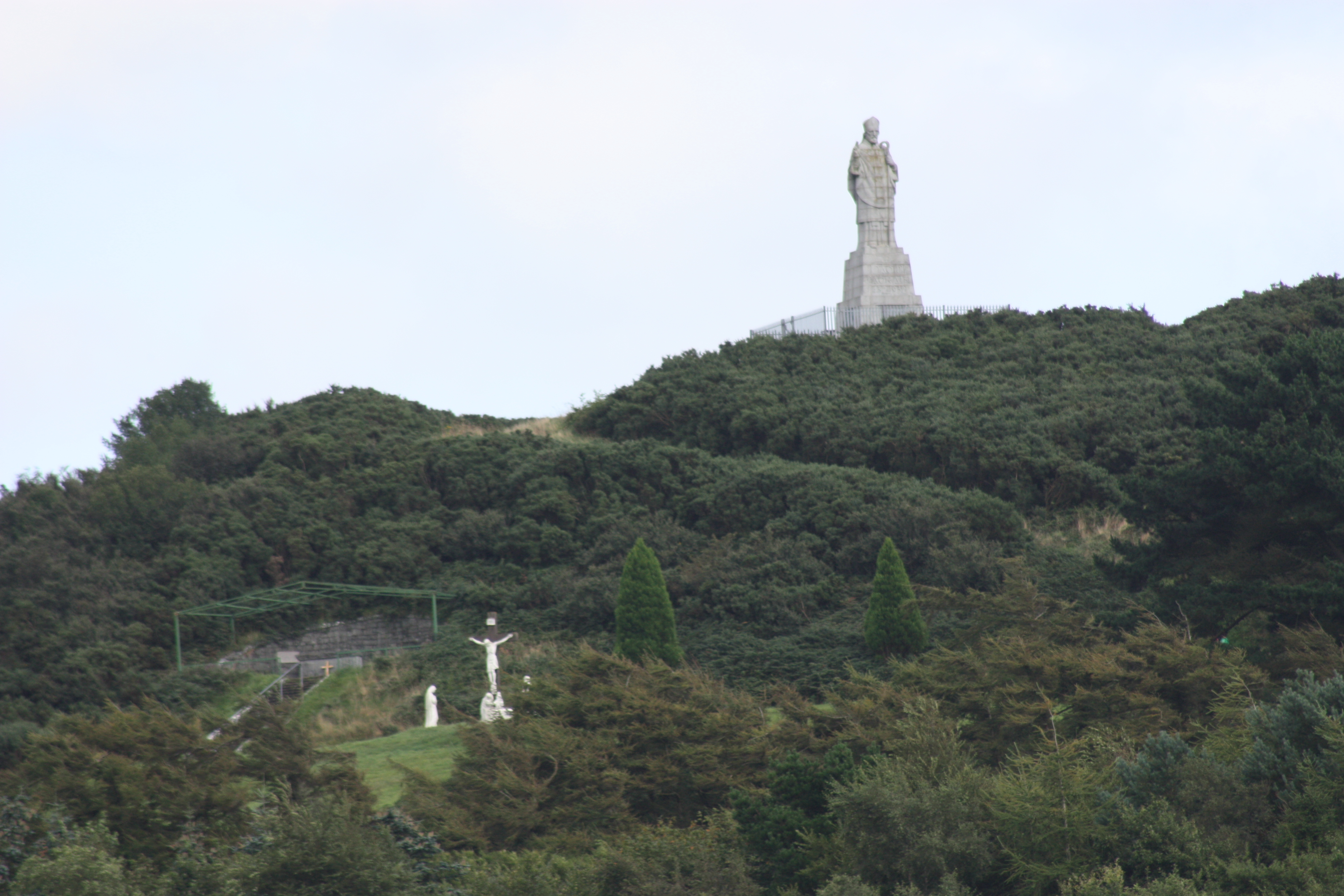
Saint Patrick's statue

Saul (Irish: Sabhall Phádraig) is a village in County Down, Northern Ireland, within the civil parish of Saul and Ballee.

The village lies to the east of Downpatrick and has strong links with Saint Patrick. It is claimed that when Saint Patrick arrived in Ireland in 432, strong currents swept his boat through the Strangford Lough tidal narrows and he landed where the Slaney River flows into the lough. The local chieftain, Dichu Mac Trichim, was converted and gave him a barn (Old Irish saball, hence the placename) for holding services. Allegedly, Saint Patrick died in Saul Monastery on 17 March 461 and is buried in nearby Downpatrick. Nearby is a hill known as St. Patrick's Shrine with a large statue of the saint at the top. The modern "Saint Patrick's Memorial Church" is built on the reputed spot of this building and includes a replica round tower.

Saul has expanded closer into Downpatrick with new estates being built such as Saul Meadows, Saul Acres and Saul Manor. The village has a soccer club and Gaelic football club St Patrick's GAC, formed in 1928.A recent revival of hurling and camogie began in 2022 after 30 years since it was last played in Saul.

== Civil parish of Saul ==
The civil parish is in the historic barony of Lecale Lower and contains the following settlements:

- Saul

=== Townlands ===
The civil parish contains the following townlands:

- Ballinarry
- Ballintogher
- Ballynagarrick
- Ballysugagh
- Ballywoodan
- Carrowcarlin
- Carrowvanny
- Castle Island
- Gores Island
- Green Island
- Hare Island
- Launches Little Island
- Launches Long Island
- Lisbane
- Lisboy
- Portloughan
- Quoile
- Ringbane
- Russells Quarter North
- Russells Quarter South
- Salt Island
- Saul
- Shark Island
- Walshestown
- Whitehills

== See also ==
- List of towns and villages in Northern Ireland
- List of civil parishes of County Down
