= Honorata of Pavia =

Saint Honorata of Pavia
- Died: 11 January 500; Pavia
- Venerated in: Catholicism; Eastern Orthodox Church
- Feast: 11 January

Honorata of Pavia (died 11 January 500 in Pavia), sister of Bishop Epiphanius (+496), was a consecrated virgin and Catholic saint. Details of her life come from Ennodius's biography of her brother. The youngest of his four pious sisters—Speciosa, Luminosa, Liberata, and Honorata—all later venerated as virgins, though some scholars count only Honorata as his blood sibling. Well-educated and dedicated to God by Epiphanius, she was captured during Odoacer's 476 sack of Pavia but ransomed by her brother along with other prisoners. She lived in prayer and charity, dying peacefully in sanctity and buried beside Epiphanius in St. Vincent's Church. In art, she appears in a tunic holding a book. Her feast is kept on the anniversary of her death.
