= Quintian, Lucius and Julian =

Saints Quintian, Lucius and Julian

Martyrs
- Died: 430 AD; Africa
- Venerated in: Roman Catholic Church; Eastern Orthodox Church
- Feast: May 23

Quintian (Quinctianus), Lucius and Julian (Julianus) are venerated as saints and martyrs by the Roman Catholic Church. According to the Roman Martyrology, they were inhabitants of North Africa who were killed during the persecutions of the Vandal king Huneric (476–484 AD), who was an Arian. However, the date of their martyrdom may be conjectural. They are the only ones named in a group of sixteen martyrs, which included several women.

According to the Catholic Encyclopedia, Quinctianus was a bishop and was probably the same person as a bishop named Urcitanus.

The Martyrologium Hieronymianum mentions other African martyrs of this same name on other feast days; however, no other information is included for the martyrs placed under the different feast days.

The Great Synaxaristes of the Orthodox Church mentions that saints Quintianus, Lucius and Julianus were martyred together with nineteen other Christians.
