= John Angeloptes =

Saint John Angeloptes

Bishop of Ravenna
- Died: 433; Ravenna, Italy
- Honored in: Roman Catholic Church, Eastern Orthodox Church
- Feast: 27 November

John Angeloptes was the Bishop of Ravenna from 430 to 433 and Metropolitan of Aemilia and Flaminia. He was the successor to St. Ursus of Ravenna. John's epithet of 'Angeloptes' denotes his gift of having had the opportunity to see an angel; more specifically, he was reported to have had an angel help him in conducting the Divine Liturgy. Due to an error in historical transmission, he is often confused with his counterpart John II.

His feast day is on 27 November.
