= Thomais of Alexandria =

Saint Thomais of Alexandria
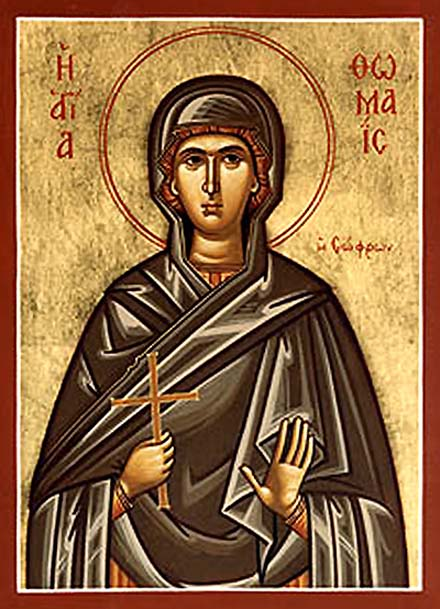

Martyr
- Born: 5th century
- Feast: April 14
- Patronage: Alexandria, Egypt

Thomais of Alexandria (Greek: Θωμαΐς; Arabic: تمادة الإسكندرية; born 5th century) was a Christian saint and martyr, she is honored and celebrated in the Roman Catholic Church and Eastern Orthodox Church on April 14.

== Early life ==
Tomaida was born in the 5th century, she was native to Alexandria. Eventually, Tomaida entered a marriage to a fisherman, her father-in-law soon became captivated and infatuated with Tomaida and endeavored to seduce her with his advances.

Whilst defending her chastity, she was stabbed to death by her father-in-law. After the incident, he went blind. He was tried and convicted and soon sentenced to be decapitated for his crime.

== Bibliography ==
- Arduino, Fabio (April 10, 2007). "Santa Tomaide d'Alessandria" [Saint Tomaide of Alejandría]. santiebeati.it.
