= Georgia of Clermont =

French nun and hermit

Saint Georgia of Clermont
- Died: c.500
- Honored in: Eastern Orthodox Church; Catholic Church
- Feast: 15 February

Georgia (died c. 500) was a virgin and hermit near Clermont, Auvergne. In the Catholic Church and Orthodox Church, she is revered as a saint and her feast day is 15 February.

== Biography ==
The only information about Saint Georgia comes from Gregory of Tours, who speaks of her in his De Gloria Confessorum (To the Glory of the Confessors). Refusing to marry, she led a hermit's life in the countryside, praying and fasting. She lived and died near Clermont-Ferrand, then the capital of Merovingian Gaul.

According to legend, during her funeral a flock of doves followed the coffin as it was carried in procession to the cemetery. They remained to guard the tomb the rest of the day. Her remains could be found in the church of San Cassiano in Clermont, France.
