= Epiphanius of Pavia =

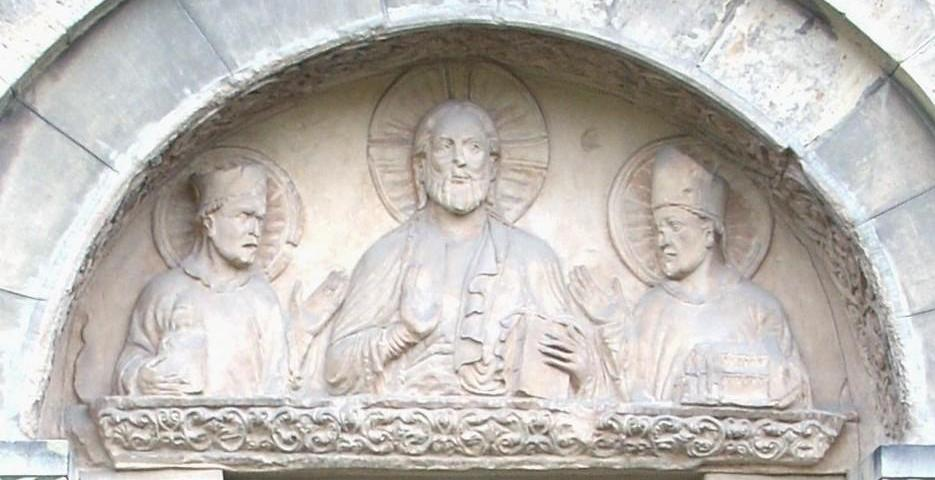
- Tympanon depicting Christ, Saint Godehard and Epiphanius, on the St. Godehard Basilica in Hildesheim, Germany.
- Born: 438; Pavia
- Died: January 21, 496 (aged 57–58)
- Venerated in: Orthodox Church; Roman Catholic Church
- Feast: 21 January

Epiphanius of Pavia (438–496), later venerated as Saint Epiphanius of Pavia, was Bishop of Pavia from 466 until his death in 496. Epiphanius additionally held the offices of lector, subdeacon and deacon.

During his lifetime, Epiphanius undertook several church-related missions and exploits. Two of the most significant of these were his journey, as an emissary for the emperor Julius Nepos, to the Visigothic king Euric; and his journey to Ravenna, where he confronted Theodoric the Great shortly after his defeat of Odoacer, and pleaded for the restoration of the civic rights of Roman aristocrats who had supported Odoacer.

== Biography ==
Our primary source for Epiphanius' life is the Vita Epifanius written by Magnus Felix Ennodius, who knew him personally, travelling with the bishop on his mission to king Gundobad of the Burgundians in 494–6. According to Ennodius, Epiphanius' father was Maurus and his mother Focaria, who was related to Mirocles bishop of Milan (304-326). He joined the household of bishop Crispinus at the age of eight and became a lector, learning to read and write, as well as stenography. At the age of 18 he was consecrated subdeacon, and deacon at 20. Then Bishop Crispinus, as he lay dying, appointed Epiphanius as his successor in the presence of the ex-consul Flavius Rusticus. Although he resisted the ordination, Epiphanius was made bishop in Milan in his 28th year.

Shortly after becoming bishop, Epiphanius was asked to intervene between Anthemius and the barbarian leader Ricimer, appealing to both parties for peace. However, history shows that Epiphanius' efforts were in vain, for violence broke out between Ricimer and Anthemius; Anthemius was besieged in the part of Rome he controlled until his supporters deserted him, and he was caught attempting to flee the city disguised as a supplicant at the church of Santa Maria in Trastevere, where he was beheaded.

Most of these confrontations and speakings to high-ranking figures proved to be successful endeavors; religious dignitaries such as Epiphanius had wide-ranging influence on the rulers and aristocrats during this period. In the eighth year of his episcopate (spring 475), the emperor Julius Nepos sent him on a diplomatic mission to Euric about Visigothic incursions. A peace was concluded, although Nepos was deposed by Orestes shortly after.

Cook notes that of "the thirteen years of Odoacer's matery in Italy, from the defeat of Orestes in A.D. 476 to the coming of Thodoric, A.D. 489 -- a period which embraced nearly half of the episcopate of Epiphanius -- Ennodius devotes but eight sections of the vita (101 - 107), five of which are taken up with the account of the restoration of churches." The only other incident Ennodius recorded during these 13 years was his successful petition to Odoacer to alleviate the rapacious demands of the praetorian prefect Pelagius.

Another success was Epiphanius' successful negotiations over the ransom of his sister Honorata, who had been abducted from the monastery of St. Vincent in Pavia, during the war between Theodoric the Great and Odoacer. After Theodoric had prevailed, one of his acts was to punish the Romans who had supported Odoacer by depriving them of their civic rights; Epiphanius went to the Ostrogothic king and pleaded for their restoration. Theodoric granted the bishop's petition, on condition that Epiphanius act on his behalf and negotiate with the Burgundians to ransom the captives they took when they raided Liguria during the war between Theodoric and Odoacer in 489.

Epiphanius died following the rigors of his winter journey to Burgundy, on 21 January 496, in his fifty-eighth year. That particular year marked thirty years of his service to the church.

== Veneration ==
Following Epiphanius' death, Ennodius, his successor as bishop of Pavia, wrote a Vita or "Life" of Epiphanius; based on internal evidence dates its composition between 501 and 504. Epiphanius' relics were translated to Hildesheim in 963, where they are conserved in a grand reliquary chasse in the Dom. Despite the extensive evidence for the removal of his remains, there was in Pavia a persistent belief in possessing Epiphanius' remains. So strong was this belief that in the 18th century they reinterred what they considered the bishop's corpse in the church of San Francesco da Paola; later these relics were translated to the church of San Francesco Grande. In 1834, Bishop Tosi of Pavia formally recognized the authenticity of these remains.
