= Saint Isidore of Alexandria =

Isidore of Alexandria
- Died: 403; Constantinople, Roman Empire
- Occupation: Priest

Saint Isidore of Alexandria was an early Christian saint. According to Alban Butler,

He was taken from his cell where he had passed many years in the desert, ordained priest, and placed in the dignity of hospitaller, by St. Athanasius. He lived in that great city a perfect model of meekness, patience, mortification, and prayer. He frequently burst into tears at table, saying: "I who am a rational creature, and made to enjoy God, eat the food of brutes instead of feeding on the bread of angels."

Palladius, afterwards bishop of Helenopolis, on going to Egypt to embrace an ascetic life, addressed himself first to our saint for advice: the skilful director bade him go and exercise himself for some time in mortification and self-denial, and then return for further instructions.

St. Isidore suffered many persecutions, first from Lucius the Arian intruder, and afterwards from Theophilus, who unjustly accused him of Origenism. He publicly condemned that heresy at Constantinople, where he died in 403, under the protection of St. Chrysostom.

== Sources ==
- Butler, Alban (1798), The Lives of the Primitive Fathers, Martyrs, and Other Principal Saints... by the Rev. Alban Butler..., J. Moir
