= Armogastes =

Saint Armogastes
- Born: Africa
- Died: after 460 near Carthage, North Africa
- Feast: 29 March

Armogastes was a 5th-century Roman noble at the Vandal court in Africa who resisted conversion to Arianism. He was enslaved and put to work in the mines, then as a cowherd. His feast day is 29 March. Archinimus and Saturus suffered at the same time, and were also reprieved from death.

== Life ==
Armogastes was described in the Roman Martyrology as a count (comes). The text may be read as saying he was superintendent of the Theatre at Mascula, but this seems an unlikely occupation for a count. Gaiseric (c. 389–477), king of the Vandals in North Africa, renounced the Orthodox faith when he was a youth and professed Arianism. He expected all his followers to do the same. Armogastes refused, even after torture, but Gaiseric did not want to make a martyr out of him, so made him a slave and cowherd. He died around AD 463.

== Monks of Ramsgate account ==
The monks of St Augustine's Abbey, Ramsgate wrote,

ARMOGASTES, MASCULAS, ARCHIMINUS and SATURUS (Saints) Martyrs (March 29)
(5th century) African victims of the Arian persecution under Genseric, King of the Vandals. We have particulars concerning them from the pen of Victor Vitensis, a trustworthy writer of the following century. They were high-born nobles at the Royal Court. Armogastes was put to the torture, but afterwards made to languish to death in slavery “lest the Romans should venerate him as a Martyr.” The other two were beheaded about A.D. 464.

== Butler's account ==
The hagiographer Alban Butler wrote,

Saints Armogastes, Archinimus, and Saturus, Martyrs

Genseric, the Arian king of the Vandals, in Africa, having, on his return out of Italy, in 457, enacted new penal laws, and severer than any he had till then put in force against Catholics, count Armogastes, was on that occasion deprived of his honours and dignities at court, and most cruelly tortured. But no sooner had the jailors bound him with cords, but they broke of themselves, as the martyr lifted up his eyes to heaven; and this happened several times. And though they afterwards hung him up by one foot with his head downwards for a considerable time, the saint was no more affected by this torment than if he had lain all the while at his ease on a feather-bed. Theodoric, the king’s son, thereupon ordered his head to be struck off: but one of his Arian priests diverted him from it, advising him to take other measures with him to prevent his being looked upon as a martyr, by those of his party, which would be of disservice to the opposite cause. He was therefore sent into Byzancena to work in the mines; and some time after, for his greater disgrace, he was removed thence into the neighbourhood of Carthage, and employed in keeping cows. But he looked upon it as his glory to be dishonoured before men in the cause of God. It was not long before he had a revelation that his end drew near. So having foretold the time of his death, and given orders to a devout Christian about the place where he desired to be interred, the holy confessor, a few days after, went to receive the rewards of those who suffer in the cause of truth.

Archinimus, of the city of Mascula, in Numidia, resisted all the artifices which the king could use to overcome his faith, and was condemned to be beheaded, but was reprieved whilst he stood under the axe. Satur, or Saturus, was master of the household to Huneric, by whom he was threatened to be deprived of his estate, goods, slaves, wife, and children, for his faith. His own wife omitted nothing in her power to prevail with him to purchase his pardon at the expense of his conscience. But he courageously answered her in the words of Job: “You have spoken like one of the foolish women. If you loved me, you would give me different advice, and not push me on to a second death. Let them do their worst: I will always remember our Lord’s words: If any man come to me, and hate not his father and mother, his wife and children, his brethren and sisters, and his own life also, he cannot be my disciple.” He suffered many torments, was stripped of all his substance, forbidden ever to appear in public, and reduced to great distress. But God enriched him with his graces, and called him to himself.

== Liguori's account ==
Alphonsus Liguori (1696–1787) wrote in his History of Heresies and Their Refutation,

Genseric next issued a decree, that no one should be admitted into his palace or that of his son, unless he was an Arian, and then, as Victor Vitensis informs us, a person called Armogastes, who was in the court of Theodoric, one of the sons of Genseric, signalized himself for his constancy in the faith. Theodoric tried every means to make him apostatize, but in vain; he first made him promises of preferment; he next threatened him, and he then subjected him to the most cruel torments. }le had his head and legs bound with cords twisted with the greatest possible force; he then was hung up in the air by one leg, with his head down, and when all this could not shake his constancy, he ordered him to be beheaded. He knew, however, that Armogastes would be venerated as a martyr by the Catholics, if this sentence were carried into exe-cution, so he changed the sentence, and compelled him to dig the earth, and tend a herd of cows. While Armogastes was one day engaged in this humble employment under a tree, he begged a friend, a Christian of the name of Felix, to bury him after his death at the foot of that tree; he died in a few days after; and when his friend, in compliance with his request, set about digging his grave, he found in the spot a marble tomb, beautifully finished, and there he buried him. The name of St. Armogastes is marked in the Roman Martyrology on 29 March, and Archiminus and Saturus, who suffered likewise, are commemorated with him.

== Sources ==
- Baring-Gould, S. (Sabine), 1834-1924 (1897), The Lives Of The Saints, vol. 3, March, London: John C. Nimmo
- Butler, Alban (1798), The Lives of the Primitive Fathers, Martyrs, and Other Principal Saints, J. Moir
- St Alphonsus M Liguori (1857), The History of Heresies and Their Refutation, The Right Rev Dr Mullock (Translator), St Athanasius Press, ISBN 978-0-9769118-0-7
- St. Augustine's Abbey, Ramsgate (1921), The Book of saints : a dictionary of servants of God canonized by the Catholic Church, London: A. & C. Black, ltd. This article incorporates text from this source, which is in the public domain.
