= List of Persian saints =

Though Persia/Iran had never been a Christian country, Christianity had enough of an impact on Persia and Persians to produce a considerable number of saints of this origin, at various times in the Church's history – some of them travelling far afield from their native country, such as Saint Ivo of Huntingdonshire who got his fame as a hermit in England.

== List ==
- Abda and Abdisho
- Abdecalas
- Abdon and Sennen
- Abrosima
- Acacius of Amida
- Acepsimas of Hnaita
- Ajabel
- Anastasius of Persia
- Aphrahat
- Asyncritus of Hyrcania
- Bademus
- Barhadbesciabas
- Saint Benjamin the Deacon and Martyr
- Christina of Persia
- Daniel and Verda
- Gentile of Matelica
- Ishoʿsabran
- James Intercisus
- Mambeca
- Mana of Bet-Parsaje
- Saint Mari
- Maris, Martha, Abachum and Audifax
- Maruthas
- Sapor of Bet-Nicator
- Simon of Bet-Titta
- Veeda of Bakh
- Zanitas and Lazarus of Persia

== See also ==
- Martyrs of Persia under Shapur II

== Modern times ==
In modern times, some with connections to Iran have been proposed for canonization. Among these are:

- Servants of God Ibrahim Addai Scher (d. 1918) and 27 Companion Martyrs of the Assyrian genocide, Archeparchs, Eparchs, Priests, Catechumens, and Laypersons of the Archeparchy of Urmia; Priests of the Congregation of the Mission (Vincentians); Martyrs (Iraq-Iran)
