= Saint Daniel =

Saint Daniel may refer to:

- Daniel (biblical figure), biblical prophet, feast day July 21 (Roman Catholic) or December 17 (Eastern Orthodox)
- Daniel of Padua (died 168), Italian martyr, feast day January 3
- Daniel of Daniel and Verda (died 344), Christian martyr in Persia, feast day 21 February
- Daniel the Stylite (409–493), Mesopotamian monk and ascetic, feast day December 11
- Daniel and companions (died 1227), seven Friars Minor martyred at Ceuta (in present-day Morocco)
- Daniel Comboni (1831–1881), Italian Catholic missionary to Africa, feast day October 10

== See also ==
- Antoine Daniel (1601–1648), French Jesuit martyr and missionary to the Hurons, feast days October 19 and September 26
