= Zanitas and Lazarus of Persia =

Christian martyrs

Zanitas, Lazarus, and Companions

Martyrs
- Died: 27 March, 326; Bardiaboch, Sassanid Empire
- Honored in: Roman Catholic Church; Eastern Orthodox Church; Oriental Orthodox Church; Ancient Church of the East; Apostolic Church of the East
- Canonized: Pre-Congregation
- Feast: 27 March

Zanitas and Lazarus (died March 27, 326 AD) were martyrs of the Christian church in the Sasanid Empire.

They were monks. With their companions Maruthas, Narses, Helias, Mares, Abibus, Sembeeth, and Sabas, were arrested and imprisoned at Bardiaboch during the persecutions of Persian king Shapur II. After being comforted and inspired by Jonas and Barachius, they withstood torture and were killed on March 27, 326.

In 339, Shapur II began the second and most fierce persecution of Christians in the Parthian kingdom. This persecution lasted for 40 years until Shapur died in 379. The church historian Socrates records sixteen thousand unnamed Christians killed at this time including 22 bishops and hundreds of clergy. Traditions records that the brothers Saints Jonas and Barachisius heard about the persecution and went to Bardiaboch, where the nine were awaiting execution. They visited the monks in jail on the eve of the execution and found they had been tortured. Jonas and Barachisius gave comforting words to the prisoners and were themselves executed days later. The eleven martyrs were buried by Habdisotes, a notable Christian of that town.

They are commemorated as pre-congregational saints in the Roman Catholic Church on March 27.

== See also ==
- Martyrs of Persia under Shapur II
