= Milus =

Milus may refer to:

- Milus or Miles (bishop of Susa) (d. c. 340)
- Milus or Melus of Bari (d. 1020)
