= Death by sawing =

Act of cutting a living person with a saw

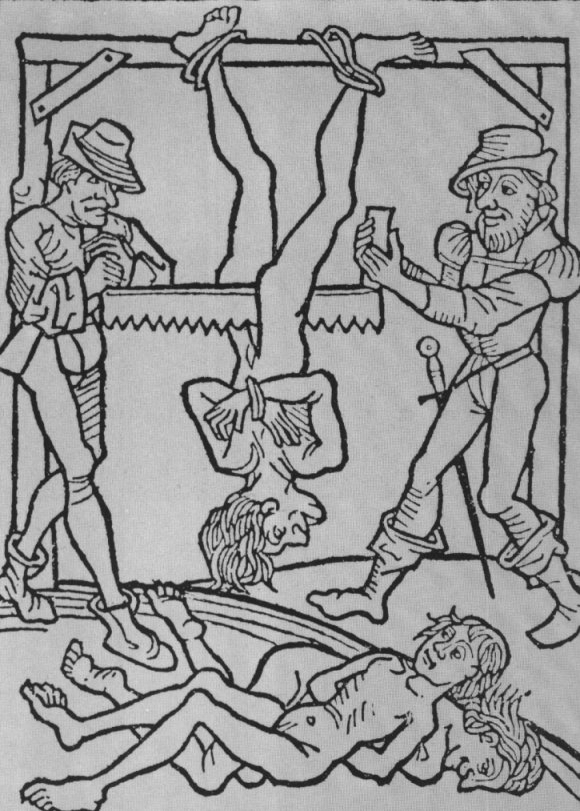
Sawing of three men, from a 15th-century print

Death by sawing is the act of sawing or cutting a living person in half, either sagittally (usually midsagittally), or transversely.

== Methods ==
Different methods of death by sawing have been recorded. In cases related to the Roman Emperor Caligula, the sawing is said to be through the middle (transversely). This method is similar to the ancient Chinese execution method of waist chopping. In the cases of Morocco, it is stated that the sawing was lengthwise, both from the groin upwards and from the skull downwards (midsagittally).

In only one case, the story about Simon the Zealot, the person is explicitly described as being hanged upside-down and sawn apart vertically through the middle, starting at the groin, with no mention of fastenings or support boards around the person, in the manner depicted in illustrations. In other cases where details about the method beyond the mere sawing act are explicitly supplied, the condemned person was apparently fastened to either one or two boards prior to sawing.

== Ancient history and classical antiquity ==
=== Ancient Persia ===
==== The legend of Jamshid ====
Jamshid was a legendary shah of Persia, whose story is told in the Shahnameh by Ferdowsi. After 300 years of blessed reign, Jamshid forgot the blessings came from Ahura Mazda, and began demanding that he be revered as a god himself. The people rebelled, and Zahhak had him sawn asunder.

==== Parysatis ====
Parysatis, wife and half-sister of Darius II (r. 423–405 BC) was the real power behind the throne of the Achaemenid Empire; she instigated and became involved in a number of court intrigues, made several enemies, yet had an uncanny knack for dispatching them at an opportune time. At one point, she decided to have the siblings of her daughter-in-law Stateira killed, and only relented from killing Stateira as well due to the desperate pleas of her son, Artaxerxes II. Stateira's sister Roxana was the first of her siblings to be killed, by being sawn in half. When Darius II died, Parysatis moved quickly, and was able to have the new queen Stateira poisoned; Parysatis still remained a power to be reckoned with for years after.

==== Hormizd IV ====
Hormizd IV (Persian: هرمز چهارم), son of Khosrow I, was the twenty-first King of Persia from AD 579 to 590. He was deeply resented by the nobility due to his cruelties. In 590, a palace coup was staged in which his son, Khosrow II, was declared king. Hormizd was forced to watch his wife and one of his sons sawn in two, and the deposed king was then blinded. After a few days, the new king is said to have killed his father in a fit of rage.

=== Thracians ===
Thracians were regarded as warlike, ferocious, and bloodthirsty by Romans and Greeks. One of the most notorious was the king Diegylis, possibly only topped by his son Ziselmius. According to Diodorus Siculus, Ziselmius sawed several people to death and commanded their families to eat the flesh of their murdered relatives. The Thracians eventually rebelled, captured him and sought to inflict every conceivable torture upon him prior to his death.

=== Ancient Rome ===
==== The Twelve Tables ====
Promulgated about 451 BC, the Twelve Tables is the oldest extant law code for the Romans. Aulus Gellius, whose work "Attic Nights" is partially preserved, states that death by the saw was mentioned for some offenses in the tables, but that the use of which was so infrequent that no one could remember ever having seen it done. Of the retained laws in the Twelve Tables, the following concerning how creditors should proceed with debtors is found in Table 3, article 6: "On the third market-day they [the creditors] shall cut pieces. If they shall have cut more or less [than their shares], it shall be with impunity." The translator notes the ambiguity of the original text, but says that later Roman writers understood this to mean that creditors were allowed to cut their shares from the body of the debtor. If true, that would constitute dismemberment, rather than sawing.

==== Caligula ====
This method of execution was uncommon throughout the time of the Roman Empire, though common during Caligula's reign, when the condemned, including members of his own family, were sawn across the torso rather than lengthwise down the body. It is said that Caligula would watch such executions while he ate, stating that witnessing the suffering acted as an appetiser.

==== The Kitos War ====
The Kitos War occurred 115–117 AD, and was a rebellion by the Jews within the Roman Empire. Major revolts happened several places, and the main source by Cassius Dio claims that in Cyrene, 220,000 Greeks were massacred by the Jews; in Cyprus, 240,000. Dio adds that many of the victims were sawn asunder, and that the Jews licked up the blood of the slain, and "twisted the entrails like a girdle about their bodies".

==== Valens ====
In 365 AD, Procopius declared himself emperor, and moved against Valens. He was defeated in battle, and due to the treachery of his two generals Agilonius and Gomoarius (they had been promised they would be "shown favour" by Valens), he was captured. In 366, he was fastened to two trees bent down with force; when the trees were released, Procopius was ripped apart in the manner of the legendary execution of the bandit Sinis. The "favour" Valens showed to Agilonius and Gomoarius was to have them both sawn asunder.

=== Jewish tradition ===
==== Death of Isaiah ====
The prophet Isaiah was, according to some traditional rabbinic texts, sawn apart on orders of King Manasseh of Judah. One tradition states that he was put within a tree, and then sawn apart; another says he was sawn apart by means of a wooden saw.

=== Christian martyrs ===
==== Simon the Zealot ====
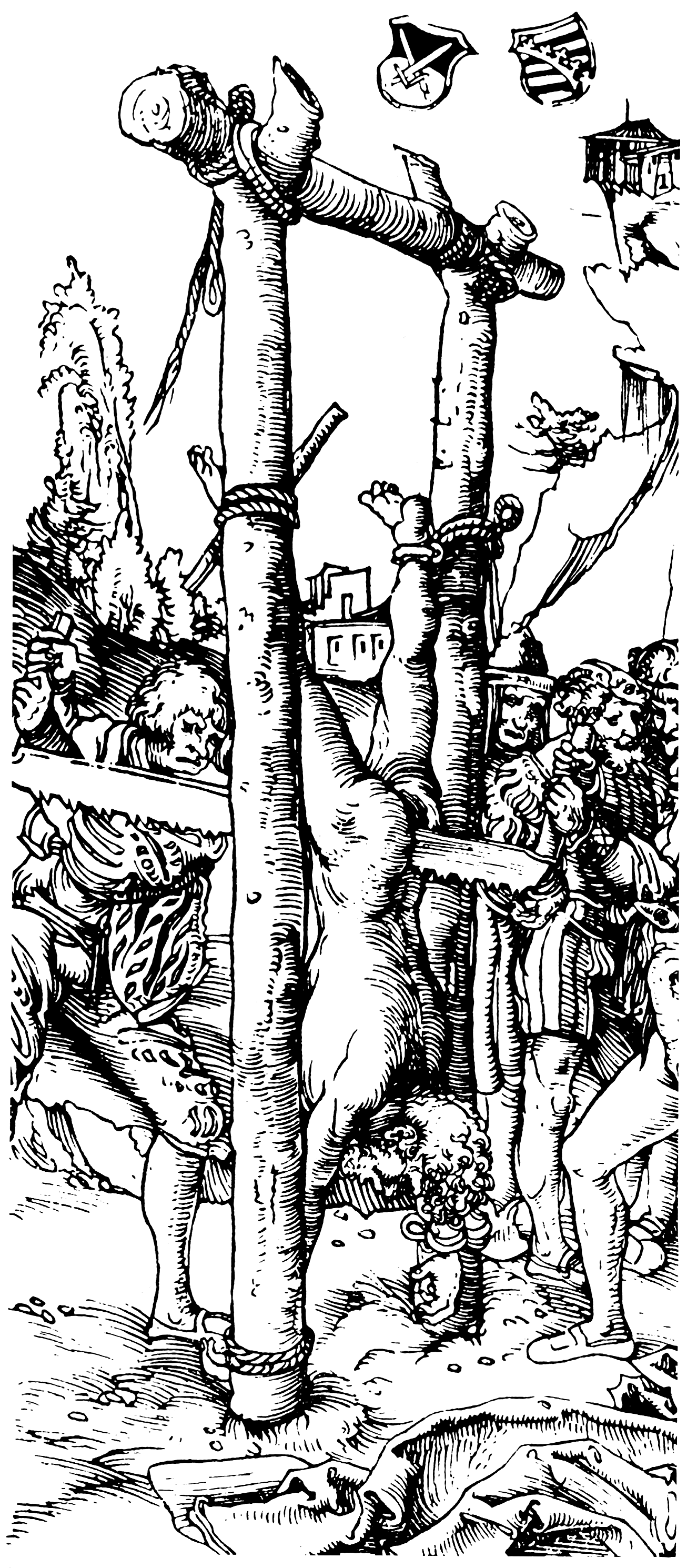
Illustration by Lucas Cranach the Elder of St. Simon sawn in two

Several early Christians are credited with being martyred by means of a saw. The earliest, and most famous, is the obscure apostle of Jesus, Simon the Zealot. He is said to have been martyred in Persia, and that the express mode by which he was executed was to be hanged up by the feet, as in the woodcut illustration.

==== Conus and his son ====
According to the Acta Sanctorum, after his wife's death in the age of Domitian, Conus went with his 7-year-old son into a desert. He destroyed several pagan idols in Cogni, Asia Minor (Anatolia). When caught, he and his son were tortured by starvation and fire, and were finally put to the saw, praying while they died.

Symphorosa and her seven sons

According to the 16th-century Foxe's Book of Martyrs, Symphorosa was a widow with seven sons living in the age of emperor Trajan (98–117) or Hadrian (117–138). Refusing a command to pray at a heathen temple, Symphorosa was scourged, and then thrown in the river Aniene with a large stone fastened to her. The six eldest sons were all killed by stab wounds, and the youngest, Eugenius, was sawn apart.

==== The 38 monks and martyrs on Mount Sinai ====
According to the Martyrologium Romanum, during the reign of Diocletian "wild barbarians" decided to rob a community of monks living at Mount Sinai. There was nothing of material wealth there, and in their rage, the Arabs slaughtered them all, several by flaying, others by sawing them with dull saws.

==== St. Tarbula ====
Accused of practising witchcraft and causing the sickness of the wife of the ardently anti-Christian Persian king Shapur II, Tarbula was condemned and executed by being sawn in half in the year 345.

== North Africa ==
=== Egypt ===
==== The monk from Montepulciano ====
In the 1630s, there are several reports from the Levant and Egypt that monks were killed. One of them, Brother Conrad d'Elis Barthelemy, a native of Montepulciano is said to have been sawn in two, from the head downwards.

==== The renegade Coptic governor ====
Writing in 1843, William Holt Yates speaks of a governor under Muhammad Ali (r.1801–1849), Abd-ur-Rahman Bey, who was said to be particularly cruel and avaricious. He was a renegade Copt, and abused his position to gain hold of wealth. He is even credited with having sawn people in two. Yates further supplies the detail: "This fellow has since been assassinated-report says, with sanction and approval of the Government"

=== Morocco ===
==== 1705 The sawing of Alcaide Melec ====
One of the most notorious cases of sawing as execution is that of the Alcaide (castellan/governor) Melec under Sultan Moulay Ishmael (r. 1672–1727). The fullest description of this execution is found in Dominique Busnot's 1714 work Histoire du règne de Mouley Ismael, although a brief notice of the event can be found in the January 1706 edition of Present state of Europe. In the following, the tale as told by Busnot will be given.

Melec was judged as the chief rebel to be punished in a rebellion instigated by one of the Sultan's sons, Mulay Muhammad. In particular, according to Busnot, the Sultaness was incensed that Melec had personally beheaded one of her cousins, Ali Bouchasra. In September/October 1705, Mulay Ismail sent for his chief carpenter and asked if his saws were capable of sawing a man in two. The carpenter answered "Sure enough". He was then given the grisly task, and before he left, he asked him whether Melec should be sawn across or along the length. The emperor said the sawing should proceed lengthwise, from the head downwards. He told Boachasra's sons they should follow the carpenter and decide for themselves how best to take revenge upon the murderer (i.e., Melec) of their father. Taking with him eight of the public executioner's assistants, the master carpenter went to the prison where Melec was held, two of his brand new saws packed in cloth, in order to keep from Melec information of the intended manner of execution. Melec was now placed on a mule, bound with an iron chain, and led to the public square, where some 4000 of his relatives and members of his tribe were assembled. These made a "terrifying" spectacle through screaming, and clawing their faces in a public display of grief. Melec, on the other hand, seemed unperturbed, calmly smoking from his tobacco pipe. When taken down from the mule, Melec's clothes were removed and damning letters "proving" his treason were cast into the fire.

Then, he was strapped onto a board, and placed upon a saw-bench, his arms and legs fastened. The executioner's team then sought to start by sawing him from the head downwards, but Boucasra's sons intervened, and demanded that one began between Melec's legs instead, because otherwise, he would die too quickly. Under the terrible screams of Melec and his relatives, thus began his execution. Once they had sawn him up to the navel, they pulled out the saw in order to commence from the other side. Melec is said to have been still conscious, asking for some water. His friends, though, thought it best to hasten his demise and shorten his sufferings, and the executioners went on, sawing him from skull to navel so he fell apart. In the process, chunks of flesh were ripped out by the saw's teeth, causing blood to splatter everywhere, thus making the execution quite unbearable to watch.

Around 300 other conspirators were impaled alive, and another report states that in addition to these, some other 20 chief conspirators had their arms and legs sawn off, and left to expire in the marketplace.

==== 1721 The sawing of Larbe Shott ====
19 July 1721, a noble descended from the Andalusian Moors, Larbe Shott was put to the saw. He had spent considerable time at Gibraltar, and one of the crimes imputed to him was to have spent time in Christian kingdoms without his emperor's leave. Furthermore, he had been found guilty of defiling himself with Christian women, and often drunk alcohol. In short, he was charged as an apostate and unbeliever, in addition to being charged with having invited the "Spaniards" to invade Barbary (i.e., treason). They brought him to one of the gates in the city, fastened him between two boards, and sawed him in two, from the skull downwards. After his death, Mulay Ishmael pardoned him, so that his body could be picked up and given a decent burial at least, instead of being eaten by the dogs.

== Americas ==
=== Cat Island mutiny ===
In 1757, a French officer was executed by his men in a mutiny on Cat Island in current-day Mississippi. Three of the mutineers were eventually captured and brought to New Orleans for trial. After conviction, two of the mutineers died on the breaking wheel. The last, a Swiss from the Karrer regiment, was nailed into a coffin-shaped wooden box which was sawn in two with a cross-cut saw. This claim was first made by the French captain and traveller Jean Bernard Bossu in his 1768 Nouveaux Voyages aux Indes Occidentales, translated into English by Johann Reinhold Forster in 1771.

In a footnote to his essay A Map within an Indian Painting?, jurist Morris S. Arnold wrote: "Bossu's books contain a lot of tall tales, so one needs to be cautious about relying on him." Bossu claims that being "sawed asunder" was a traditional Swiss military punishment, and alleges that one Swiss mutineer actually committed suicide to avoid that punishment. Therefore, the one who was allegedly sawn in half had his punishment as governed by Swiss military law, rather than French. An incident from 1741 (in Louisbourg, Canada) shows that at that time, when two Frenchmen and a Swiss were executed, Swiss mercenary troops had been placed under French military law, rather than under Swiss. Furthermore, detailing the recorded executions in the Swiss Canton of Zürich through the 15th-18th century, Gerold Meyer von Knonau records 1445 executions in total, none of them being through death by sawing.

=== Haitian revolution ===
In August 1791, a great slave revolt broke out at Saint-Domingue, eventually leading to Haitian independence. In the process, some 4,000 white planters and their family members were massacred. One of the victims was a carpenter by trade, Robert. The rebels decided he "should die in the way of his occupation" and accordingly fastened him between two boards and sawed him apart.

== Asia ==
=== Levant ===
==== An episode from the Crusades ====
In 1123, Joscelin de Courtenay and Baldwin II were separately ambushed and surprised by a Turkish emir, Balac, and made prisoners at the castle at Quartapiert. Some 50 Armenians, bound by oath to Joscelin as Count of Edessa, decided to free their liege lord as well as Baldwin II. Dressed as monks and pedlars, they gained entry in the town where the two nobles were held captive, and managed, through massacre, to take control of the castle. Joscelin slipped out in order to raise a force, while Baldwin II and his nephew Galeran remained behind to hold the castle. Apprised of the capture of the castle, Balac sent quickly a force to recapture it, and Baldwin II saw no possibility of holding it. Graciously, Balac took Baldwin and his nephew merely prisoners. Not so merciful was he towards the Armenians: Several of them were flayed, others buried up to the neck and used as target practice, the rest were sawn apart.

==== The Assassins ====
The Assassins, a misnomer for the Nizari, an Ismaili sect, had an independent kingdom in the Levant during the age of the Crusades, and were feared and loathed by Muslims and Christians alike. The Jewish traveller Benjamin of Tudela, travelling the region around 1157 notes that the Assassins were reputed to saw in two the kings of other peoples, if they managed to capture them.

=== Ottoman Empire ===
A number of accounts exist where the Ottomans are said to have sawn persons in two, most of them said to occur in Mehmed the Conqueror's reign (1451–1481).

==== 1453 conquest of Constantinople ====
A number of cruel excesses against the populace of Constantinople are said to have happened in the wake of the taking of the city. According to one rendering of the tale:

They no sooner found themselves masters of it, than they began to exercise on the inhabitants the most unremitting barbarities, destroying them by every method of ingenious cruelty. Some they roasted alive on spits, others they starved, some they flayed alive, and left them in that horrid manner to perish; many were sawn asunder, and others torn to pieces by horses. Three days and nights was the city given to spoil, in which time the soldiers were licensed to commit every enormity.

==== 1460 Capture of Mystras ====
After the last Despot of Morea, Demetrios Palaiologos, in 1460 switched allegiance to the Turks and gave them entry to Mystras, a tale grew up that the actual castellan at the castle of Mystras was ordered sawn in two. This tale was "well known" in later centuries, whatever its actual veracity.

==== 1460 Michael Szilágyi ====
In 1460, the Hungarian general Michael Szilágyi was seized by the Turks, and since he was regarded as a traitor and spy, he was sawn in half at Constantinople.

==== 1460–1464 campaigns and slaughter in the Morea ====
In the following years, inhabitants in Greece under the Venetians fought several battles in the Morea. In 1464, for example, a small city is said to have been subdued, and 500 prisoners sent to Constantinople. There, they were put to the saw, according to one account.

==== 1463 conquest of Mytilene, Lesbos ====
The Knights Hospitallers, then stationed at Rhodes, sent several knights to aid in the defence of Mytilene from the Turks. They eventually surrendered, under promise of having their lives spared. Instead, according to some reports, they were sawn asunder. According to Kenneth Meyer Setton, the sultan had actually promised to spare the heads of some 400 knights, and sawed them in half to keep his oath of not harming the heads.

==== 1469/1470 conquest of Negroponte ====
The Triarchy of Negroponte, a Crusader state or Stato da Màr under control of the Republic of Venice, was extinguished by the capture of the city in 1469/1470, and the governor Paolo Erizzo, is said to treacherously to have been ordered sawn in two, after have being promised his life would be spared. The sultan, Mehmed the Conqueror, is said to have cut off the head of Erizzo's daughter by his own hands, because she would not yield to his desires.

==== 1473 The arsonist at Gallipoli ====
In 1473, a Sicilian called Anthony is said to have set fire to the sultan's ships at the Sanjak of Gelibolu, Gallipoli. After being captured at Negroponte, he was brought before the sultan who asked him what harm had been done to him that he performed such an evil deed? The young man answered that he simply wanted to harm the enemy of Christianity in some glorious way. The sultan is said to have ordered that Anthony should be sawn in two.

==== 1480 invasion of Otranto ====
In 1480, the Ottomans, led by Gedik Ahmed Pasha, invaded mainland Italy, occupying Otranto. A general massacre, of disputed magnitude, occurred. Archbishop Stefano Pendinelli was, by some reports, ordered to be sawn in half.

==== 1611 revolt of Dionysius the Philosopher ====
Dionysius the Philosopher led an eventually unsuccessful revolt against the Ottomans, seeking to establish a power base at Ioannina. Dionysius was flayed alive, and his skin, stuffed with straw, was sent as a present to the sultan, Ahmed I, at Constantinople. The other principal conspirators were said to be punished in various ways, some were burnt alive, others impaled, and yet others sawn asunder.

==== The mythologized death of Rhigas, the protomartyr of Greek independence ====
Rigas Feraios (1760–1798) was an early Greek patriot, whose struggle for independence of Greece preceded with about 30 years the general uprising known as the Greek War of Independence. His actual manner of death has garnered many tales; Encyclopædia Britannica 1911, for example, states that he was shot in the back. Yet others state that he was strangled. Some 19th century stories report that he was sawn in two. Finally, one source asserts he was beheaded.

=== Mughal Empire ===
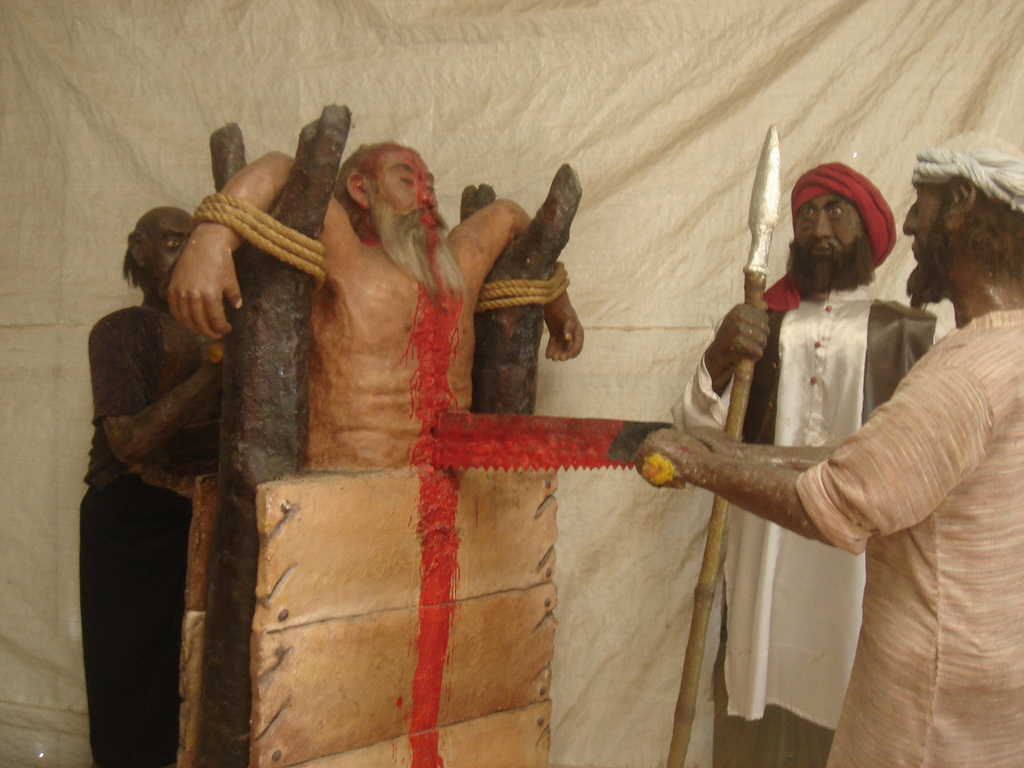
An artistic rendering of the execution of Bhai Mati Das by the Mughals. This image is from a Sikh Ajaibghar near the towns of Mohali and Sirhind in Punjab, India.

The Sikh Bhai Mati Das, a follower of the 9th guru, Guru Tegh Bahadur was in 1675 AD ordered to be executed by emperor Aurangzeb, along with several other prominent Sikhs, including their Guru, because the Guru was resisting the forceful conversion of Kashmiri Pandits into Islam. Bhai Mati Das was sawn in half, the others in different manners.

=== Burma ===
Several European reports state that even in the 1820s, sawing criminals in two was an occasional punishment in Burma for "certain offences". The criminals were fastened between two planks prior to the sawing. This may have been conflated by reports of disembowelment, for which eyewitness reports exist.

According to a British account, the Burmese general Maha Bandula is said to have had one of his high-ranking officers sawn in two, due to some act of disobedience, the person being fastened between two planks for that purpose.

=== Vietnam ===
==== Martyrdom of Augustin Huy ====
On occasion, a confusion of reports may exist where, for example, performed post-mortem indignities are misinterpreted as the actual manner of execution:

In 1839, the governor of Vietnam's Nam Định Province summoned five hundred soldiers to a banquet to pressure them into trampling upon a cross in renunciation of Christianity. Most of the guests complied, but three Catholic soldiers refused. One of the Vietnamese Martyrs, Augustin Huy, is reported by some sources to have been sawn in two. Others report that he was hacked to death, or cut in two. But a letter from 1839, just three weeks after the execution 12 June, states that he was beheaded:

I have to announce to you the death of two Tonquinese, who here shed their blood for the faith on the 12th of June, 1839. They were beheaded near the port of Cua-thuan-an, the principal port of Hue. Their bodies were first cut into five pieces and then cast into the sea.

=== Imperial China ===
==== Technique ====
The movement of a saw may cause a body to sway back and forth making the process difficult for the executioners. The Chinese overcame this problem by securing the victim in an upright position between two boards firmly fixed between stakes driven deep into the ground. Two executioners, one at each end of the saw, would saw downwards through the stabilized boards and enclosed victim. Whether sawing as an execution method actually existed, or that cases referred to are garbled accounts of the "slow slicing" method of execution remains an open question.

==== Tang dynasty ====
The emperor Zhaozong of Tang (r. 888–904) is said to have commanded one of his prisoners sawn asunder.

==== Qing dynasty ====
When the last emperor of the Ming dynasty committed suicide in 1644, the new emperor had one of the previous regime's strongest supporters, Chen, said to be viceroy of Canton, sawn in two. Growing more popular in his martyrdom, the new regime condemned Chen's execution, declared he was a holy man and erected a Canton pagoda in his memory.

== Europe ==
=== Spain ===
==== Morisco revolt ====
In the aftermath of the destruction of the last Islamic kingdom in Spain, Granada in 1492, the Moriscoes, the descendants of Muslims and those who still were, in secret, adherents of Islam, felt increasingly persecuted. In 1568, the Morisco revolt broke out, under leadership of Aben Humeya. The crushing of the revolt was extremely bloody, and at Almería in 1569, the historian Luis del Marmol Carvajal states that one Morisco was sawn apart alive.

==== La Mancha rebellion ====
In the Spanish rebellion of 1808 against the occupying French forces, reports exist that some French officers were sawn in two. In one of those reports, it is colonel Rene (or Frene) who met this fate. In another report, Rene was merely thrown into a kettle of boiling water, whereas the officers Caynier and Vaugien were the ones sawn in two.

=== Russia ===
==== 1812 Grande Armée ====
After the Fire of Moscow in September 1812, the French Grande Armée had not exactly endeared itself to the local population. The peasant population is said to have become embittered, fanaticized, and even developed an effective guerrilla. In addition, the "wild Cossacks" lurked about, and both groups of Russians could be a deadly enemy to solitary French soldiers. Some of those unfortunates are said to have been sawn apart.

=== Hungary ===
==== 1848 Revolution ====
The Hungarian Revolution of 1848 was a bitter struggle where atrocities were committed against others of different ethnicities and of different religious persuasions. A decidedly partisan pamphlet from 1850, Ungarns gutes recht (The well-founded right of Hungary) from 1850, states that in the struggles around Banat, some 4,000 Serbians, spurred on by the preaching of the Metropolitan of Karlovci, Josif Rajačić, committed heinous deeds against the Hungarians. Women, children and old men were mutilated, roasted over slow fires, some sawn apart.

== Cultural references ==
=== Tortures after death ===
==== Hindu mythology ====
In Hindu lore, Yama is the god of death. He determines the punishments to those who were wicked in life. Those guilty of robbing a Brahmin, are to be sawn apart while being in Naraka (Hell).

==== Chinese mythology ====
Sawing people asunder is one of the punishments said to occur in Buddhist Hell, and the priests knew how to make a visible spectacle of sufferings in the beyond, by commissioning artists to make paintings the populace were meant to see and reflect upon:

At a Buddhist temple in Canton, at certain seasons of the year, the court is set round with pictures, which pourtray in a fearful manner the sufferings of the dead. Some are sawn asunder; some are gored with pitchforks; some are thrown into a cauldron of boiling water; others are burnt. The artists, under the gifted instruction of the priests, succeeded in representing every sight that is terrible to the eye or revolting to the senses. In the recess at Mongha beforementioned, a few of these choice subjects were displayed with an edifying effect. The presumed existence of a place of torment brings a revenue into the coffers of the priest, who is assumed to have the power of appeasing the wrath of the judges.

=== Segare la vecchia ===
In Italy and Spain, a curious tradition of segare la vecchia ("sawing the old woman") was upheld on Laetare Sunday (Mid-Lent Sunday) in hamlets and towns, well into the 19th century. The custom consisted of the boys running about to find the "oldest woman in the village", and then make a wooden effigy in her likeness. Then, the wooden figure was sawn across the middle. The folklorist Jacob Grimm regards this as an odd spring ritual, in which the "old year"/winter is symbolically defeated. He also notes that a rather similar custom existed in his day among Southern Slavs.

== See also ==
- Outline of capital punishment

== Bibliography ==
- Abbott, G. (2004). Execution: A Guide To The Ultimate Penalty. Summersdale Publishers Ltd. ISBN 1-84024-433-X.
- Anonymous (1850). Ungarns gutes recht:eine historische denkschrift von einem diplomaten. London: W.M. Watts.
- Asiatic Journal (1840). Asiatic Journal, volume 32 New series. London: Allen&co.
- von der Aurachl, Ph. S. (1859). Das Heil kommt nicht aus Oesterreich: Eine Stimme aus Bayern. Berlin: Ferdinand Riegel.
- Benjamin of Tudela; Martinet, Adam (tr) (1858). Reisetagbuch:Ein Beitr. zur Kenntniß d. Juden in d. Diaspora während d. XII. Jhs. Bamberg.
- Bridgman, Elijah C.; Williams, Samuel W. (1841). The Chinese Repository, Volume 10. Canton: Bridgman and Williams.
- Busnot, Dominique (1716). Das Leben des Blutdürstigen Tyrannen Muley-Ismael, jetztregierenden Kaysers von Marocco. Hamburg: von Wiering.
- Censer, Jack; Hunt, Lynn (2001). Liberty, Equality, Fraternity: Exploring the French Revolution. University Park, Pennsylvania: Pennsylvania State University Press. ISBN 0-271-02088-1.
- Chateaubriand, François-Réné (1812). Travels in Greece, Palestine, Egypt, and Barbary during the years 1806 and 1807, Volume 2. London: h. Colburn.
- Coleman-Norton, P.R. (1948). The Twelve Tables. Princeton Univ. Dept. of Classics. ASIN B0007HKWAO.
- Collins, Arthur; Brydges, Sir Egerton (1812). Collins's Peerage of England; Genealogical, Biographical, and Historical, Volum 6. London: F. C. and J. Rivington, Otridge and son.
- Deinl, Franz (1830). Römisches Martyrologium, wie es von dem Papste Gregor dem Dreyzehnten eingerichtet, und von Benedikt dem Vierzehnten verbessert wurde. Munich: Daisenberger.
- Dignas, Beate; Winter, Engelbert (2007). Rome and Persia in late antiquity: neighbours and rivals. Cambridge University Press.
- Diodorus Seculus; Wurm, Julius F. (tr.) (1840). Historische Bibliothek, Volum 19. Stuttgart: J.B. Metzler.
- Du Pin, Louis E. (1699). A compleat history of the canon and writers of the books of the Old and New Testament: by way of dissertation with useful remarks on that subject, Volume 1. London: H. Rhodes.
- Edwards, Bryan (1819). The History, Civil and Commercial, of the British West Indies, Volum 3. London: G. and W.B. Whittaker.
- Fallmerayer, Jakob P. (1836). Geschichte der Halbinsel Morea während des Mittelalters: Bd. Morea, durch innere Kriege zwischen Franken und Byzantin verwüstet und von albanesischen Colonisten überschwemmt, wird endlich von den Türken erobert. Von 1250-1500 nach Christus. Stuttgart: J.G. Cotta'schen Buchhandlung.
- de Ferreras, Juan; Semler, Johann S. (1760). Algemeine Historie von Spanien: Mit den Zusätzen der französischen Uebersetzung nebst der Fortsetzung bis auf gegenwärtige Zeit, Volume 10. Halle: Gebauer.
- Forster, Johann R.; Bossu, Jean-Bernard (1771). Travels Through that Part of North America Formerly Called Louisiana, Volum 1. London: T. Davies. ISBN 9780608438306.
- Foxe, John (1840). Book of Martyrs: A Universal History of Christian Martyrdom from the Birth of Our Blessed Saviour to the Latest Periods of Persecution, Volumes 1-2. Philadelphia: E.C. Biddle.
- Foy, Maximilien S. (1827). Geschichte des Krieges auf der pyrenäischen Halbinsel unter Napoleon, 3. Stuttgart: Francky.
- Geyer, J.K. (1738). Christ-Catholische Hauß-Postill Oder Auslegung Deren Sonn- und Feyertäglichen Evangelien, Volume 2. Passau: Lang.
- Gibbon, Edward (1776). The History of the Decline and Fall of the Roman Empire, Volum 1. London: W. Strahan and T. Cadell.
- Gliddon, George R. (1841). A Memoir on the Cotton of Egypt. London: J. Madden.
- Grimm, Jacob (1835). Deutsche Mythologie. Göttingen: Dieterichsche Buchhandlung. ISBN 9783598509902.
- Grumeza, Ion (2010). The Roots of Balkanization: Eastern Europe C.E. 500-1500. Lanham, Maryland: University Press of America. ISBN 9780761851356.
- Günther, Johannes; Schulz, Otto A. (1856). Handbuch für Autographensammler. Leipzig: O.A. Schulz.
- Hahn, Heinrich (1860). Geschichte der katholischen Missionen seit Jesus Christus bis auf die neueste Zeit: Für die Mitglieder der katholischen Missions-Vereine und alle Freunde der Missionen, Volum 3. Cologne: DuMont-Schauberg.
- Head, Duncan; Heath, Ian (1982). Armies of the Macedonian and Punic Wars 359 BC to 146 BC: Organisation, Tactics, Dress and Weapons. Wargames Research Group.
- Heyne, Carl T. (1840). Geschichte Napoleons von der Wiege bis zum Grabe: Für alle Völker deutschen Sinnes und deutscher Zunge in Wort und Bild, Volum 2. Chemnitz: Goedsche.
- Hughes, Thomas S. (1820). Travels in Sicily, Greece & Albania, Volum 2. London: J. Mawman.
- Inderbitzi, Thomas (1840). Annalen der Verbreitung des Glaubens: Monatsschr. D. Vereins der Glaubensverbreitung, Volum 8. Mainz: Kirchheim, Schott&Thielmann.
- Institution for the Progation of the Faith (1840). Annals of the propagation of the faith: a periodical collection of letters from the bishops and missionaries employed in the missions of the old and new word, volume 1. London: Andrews.
- Judson, Ann H. (1823). An account of the American Baptist mission to the Burman empire: in a series of letters, addressed to a gentleman in London. London: J. Butterworth & Son and T. Clark.
- Knonau, Gerold M. von (1846). 1901 Reprint: Der canton Zürich, historisch-geographisch-statistisch geschildert von den ältesten zeiten bis auf die gegenwart Volume 2. Zürich: Huber und compagnie.
- Knowles, James D. (1830). Life of Mrs. Ann H. Judson: late missionary to Burmah. Philadelphia: American Sunday school union.
- von Kreckwitz, Abraham (1654). Sylvula Politico-Historica Lustwäldlin Allerhand Politischer Gnomen und Historien: Auß vielen Glaubwürdigen Scribenten meistes Auß dem Latein- vnnd Frantzösischen Inns Deütsche transferiret, Vnd Summarisch ohn allen ornat also verfasset Daß es in Täglicher Conversation Discoursen vnd Gesprächen Fug- vnd Nutzlich kan gebraucht werden, Volume 1. Leipzig: Riese.
- Lay, George T. (1841). The Chinese as they are: their moral, social, and literary character. A new analysis of the language; with succinct views of their principal arts and sciences. London: W. Ball and Co.
- Lempriere, John; Lord, Eleazar (1825). Lempriere's universal biography:containing a critical and historical account of the lives, characters, and labours of eminent persons, in all ages and countries. Together with selections of foreign biography from Watkin's dictionary, recently published, and about eight hundred original articles of American biography, Volume 1. New York: R. Lockwood.
- Lewis, G.Malcolm; Arnold, Morris S. (1998). "A Map within an Indian Painting?" in Cartographic Encounters: Perspectives on Native American Mapmaking and Map Use. Chicago: University of Chicago Press. ISBN 9780226476940.
- Majer, Friedrich; Gruber, Johann G. (1804). Allgemeines Mythologisches Lexicon: Aus Original-Quellen bearbeitet. Welche die nicht altklassischen Mythologien, nämlich die heiligen Mythen und Fabeln, so wie die religiösen Ideen und Gebräuche der Sinesen, Japaner ... enthält, volume 2. Weimar: Verlag des Landes-Industrie-Comptoirs.
- Mignot, Vincent; Hawkins, A. (tr) (1787). The history of the Turkish, or Ottoman Empire: from its foundation in 1300, to the peace of Belgrade in 1740. To which is prefixed An historical discourse on Mahomet and his successors, Volum 1. Exeter: R. Thorn.
- Murray, J (1829). The Quarterly Review, volume 41. London: J. Murray.
- Napier, William F. P. (1862). History of the war in the Peninsula and in the south of France: from the year 1807 to the year 1814, Volum 1. New York: W.J. Widdleton.
- Napier, William F. P. (1839). History of the war in the Peninsula and in the south of France: from the year 1807 to the year 1814, Volum 1. Paris: Charles Hingray.
- Osborne, T. (1742). An Universal History, from the Earliest Account of Time to the Present; Compiled from Original Authors and Illustrated with Maps, Cuts, Notes, Chronological and Other Tables, Volum 6. London: T. Osborne et al.
- Osborne, T. (1744). An Universal History, from the Earliest Account of Time to the Present; Compiled from Original Authors and Illustrated with Maps, Cuts, Notes, Chronological and Other Tables, Volum 2. London: T. Osborne et al.
- Osborne, T. (1747). An Universal History, from the Earliest Account of Time to the Present; Compiled from Original Authors and Illustrated with Maps, Cuts, Notes, Chronological and Other Tables, Volum 5. London: T. Osborne et al.
- Pachtler, Georg M. (1861). Das Christenthum in Tonkin und Cochinchina, dem heutigen Annamreiche: von seiner Einführung bis auf die Gegenwart. Paderborn: F. Schöningh.
- Pouqueville, Francois C.H.L. (1813). Travels in the Morea, Albania, and Other Parts of the Ottoman Empire. London: Henry Colburn.
- Reider, William D (1841). The new tablet of memory; or, Recorder of remarkable events, alphabetically arranged, from the earliest period. London: John Clements.
- Rhodes, Henry (1706). The Present State of Europe, Or, The Historical and Political Mercury, Volum 17. London: Henry Rhodes.
- Rosenmüller, E.F.K. (1820). Das alte und neue Morgenland oder Erläuterungen der heiligen Schrift aus der natürlichen Beschaffenheit, den Sagen, Sitten und Gebräuchen des Morgenlandes, Volum 5. Leipzig: Baumgärtner.
- Sadler, Johann E.; Heim, Franz J. (1858). Vollständiges Heiligen-Lexikon, oder Lebensgeschichten aller Heiligen, Seligen aller Orte und aller Jahrhunderte, deren Andenken in der katholischen Kirche gefeiert oder sonst geehrt Wird. Augsburg: F.C.
- Salisbury, A. (1830). A History of the most distinguished martyrs: in various ages and countries of the world. Philadelphia: A. Salisbury.
- Scott, G.R. (1995). A History Of Torture. Merchant Book Company Limited. ISBN 1-85958-174-9.
- Schild, Wolfgang (1997). Die Geschichte der Gerichtsbarkeit. Munich: Callwey Verlag 1980. Lizenz für Nikol Verlagsgesellschaft mbH, Hamburg.
- Schmauss, Johann J. (1719). Ausführliches Heiligen-Lexicon: Darinn Das gottseelige Leben und der Tugend-Wandel, das standhaffte Leyden und Sterben, und die grossen Wunderwercke aller Heiligen Gottes... Beschrieben werden. Cologne and Frankfurt.
- Setton, Kenneth M (1978). The Papacy and the Levant, 1204-1571: The Fifteenth Century, volume 2. Philadelphia: American Philosophical Society. ISBN 9780871691279.
- Singha, H.S (2000). The Encyclopedia of Sikhism. New Delhi: Hemkunt Press. ISBN 9788170103011.
- Smedley, Edward (1832). Sketches from Venetian history, volume 2. New York: J, J. Harper.
- Sozomen (1846). A History of the Church in nine books, from A.D.324 to A.D.440. London: S. Bagster and Sons.
- Warnekros, Heinrich E. (1832). Entwurf der Hebräischen Alterthümer. Weimar: Hoffmann.
- Watkins, John (1806). A biographical, historical and chronological dictionary. London: Richard Phillips.
- Webber, Christopher; McBride, Angus (2001). The Thracians 700 BC-AD 46 (Men-at-Arms). Osprey Publishing.
- Wigand, Otto (1844). Wigands Vierteljahrsschrift volume 1. Leipzig: Otto Wigand.
- Windus, John (1725). A journey to Mequinez, the residence of the present emperor of Fez and Morocco: On the occasion of Commodore Stewart's embassy thither for the redemption of the british captives in the year 1721. London: J. Tonson.
- Yates, William H. (1843). The Modern History and Condition of Egypt, Its Climate, Diseases, and Capabilities, Volum 2. London: Smith, Elder and Company.

Web resources

- catholic.org. "St. Tarbula". catholic.org.
- catholic Online. "St. Domingo Nicolas Dat Dinh". catholic.org.
- Chisholm, Hugh, ed. (1911). "Rhigas, Constantine" . Encyclopædia Britannica. Vol. 23 (11th ed.). Cambridge University Press. pp. 239–240.
- Suetonius; Rolfe, J.C. (tr.) (1914). "The Lives of the Twelve Caesars". Loeb Classical Library.
