= Daniel and Verda =

Christian martyrs under King Shapur II of Persia

Saints Daniel and Verda Martyrs
- Born: Persia
- Died: 344; Persia
- Canonized: Pre-congregation
- Feast: 21 February

Saints Daniel and Verda (died 344) were Christian martyrs under King Shapur II of Persia. Their feast day is 21 February.

== Monks of Ramsgate account ==
The Monks of Ramsgate wrote in their Book of Saints (1921),

Daniel and Verda (SS.) Martyrs (Feb. 21)
(4th cent.) Persian Martyrs, greatly honoured in the East, who suffered under King Sapor II (A.D. 344).

== Butler's account ==
The hagiographer Alban Butler (1710–1773) wrote in his Lives of the Fathers, Martyrs, and Other Principal Saints under February 21,

SS. Daniel, Priest, and Verda, Virgin, Martyrs
From their authentic acts, written by St. Maruthas, in Syriac, and published by Stephen Assemani among the Oriental Martyrs, t. 1. p. 108.
A.D. 344.

TWO years after the martyrdom of St. Milles, Daniel, a priest, and a virgin consecrated to God, named Verda, which in Chaldaic signifies a rose, were apprehended in the province of the Razicheans, in Persia, by an order of the governor, and put to all manner of torments for three months, almost without intermission. Among other tortures, their feet being bored through, were put into frozen water for five days together. The governor, seeing it impossible to overcome their constancy, condemned them to lose their heads. They were crowned on the 25th of the moon of February, which was that year the 21st of that month, in the year of Christ 344, and of King Sapor II. the thirty-fifth. Their names were not known either to the Greek or Latin martyrologists: and their illustrious triumph is recorded in few words by St. Maruthas: but was most glorious in the sight of heaven.

== See also ==
- Martyrs of Persia under Shapur II

== Sources ==
- Butler, Alban (1866), The Lives of the Fathers, Martyrs, and Other Principal Saints, vol. 2, James Duffy This article incorporates text from this source, which is in the public domain.
- St. Augustine's Abbey, Ramsgate (1921). The Book of saints : a dictionary of servants of God canonized by the Catholic Church. London: A. & C. Black, ltd. OCLC 671676136. This article incorporates text from this source, which is in the public domain.
