= Tarbula =

Persian saint, virgin, and martyr (d. between 341 and 349)

Saint Tarbula
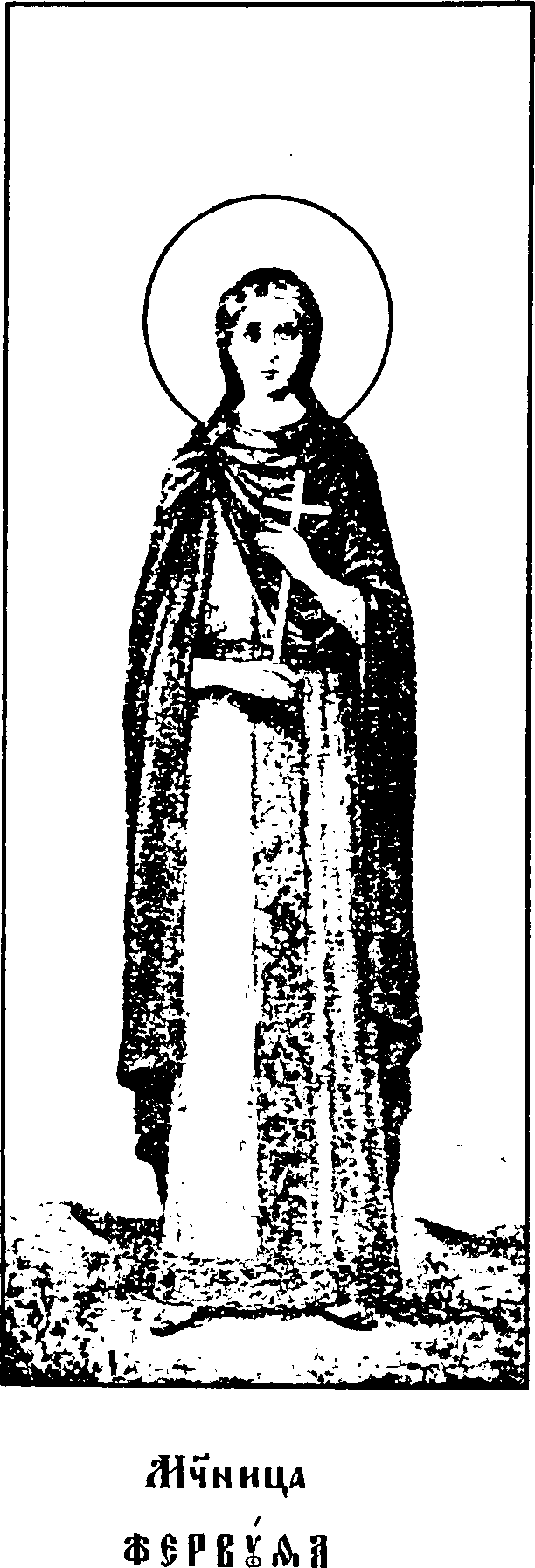
- Born: Sasanian Empire
- Died: 341 or 349; Sasanian Empire
- Venerated in: Catholic Church, Assyrian Church of the East, Eastern Orthodox Church
- Feast: 4 April

Tarbula (d. between 341 and 349), also called Tarbu, Therbuta, Pherbutha, and Phermoutha, (Syriac: ܬܪܒܘ Tarbo) was a Syriac Christian saint, virgin, and martyr who was cut in half by saw after being accused of witchcraft and causing the illness of the Persian queen, wife of Shapur II. Her feast day is 4 April, and she has been commemorated in one of the Persian martyr acts.

== Life ==
Tarbula was born in what is now modern-day Iraq. Her brother was Saint Symeon (also called Simeon), bishop of what is now Al-Mada'in. Their father was a fuller. Tarbula also had a sister whose name is unknown. In some texts "Tarbo" or "Tharba" is the name given to Tarbula, while her sister is named "Pherbutha". Tarbula however is how the historian Sozomen translated her name into Greek.

Tarbula, her sister, and a servant were all virgins and lived together "in a kind of ascetic house community", in the manner of Members of the Covenant.

Tarbula, her sister and the servant were brought to the royal court to attend the queen of Persian emperor Shapur II. Tarbula was "distinguished by her extraordinary beauty"; the Roman lawyer and Church historian Sozomen called Tarbula "beautiful and very stately in form". The queen suggested that she marry to increase her position, but Tarbula refused because she had made a vow to a life of service to God and virginity. One of the priests (magi) of the queen's court offered to marry Tarbula as well, but she also refused him; he might have accused the three women of poisoning the queen.

All three women were accused of witchcraft and for causing the queen's illness, in retaliation for the death of Symeon who had been murdered by Shapur II. A few sources blame the Jewish leaders for their arrest, conviction, and execution; though the religion of the Sasanids was Zoroastrianism, the queen was a Jewish convert and "had great confidence in the attachment of her co-religionists".

According to Sozomen, the case against the women was interpreted as retaliation against Emperor Constantine's banning of the prostitution of young girls and the destruction of the temple of Venus. One of the case's judges became "deeply enamored with her" and secretly proposed that she have intercourse with him in exchange for money and her freedom and the freedom of her sister and servant, but Tarbula refused. The other two judges also offered the women freedom in exchange for intercourse with them. The women were found guilty, condemned to death, and were cut in half by saw, then dismembered and their body parts nailed to gibbets. Their execution was called an "especially cruel martyrdom". The queen was advised to pass between the women's bodies to dissolve their curse against her and to heal her disease.

Their bodies were thrown into a ditch, which Christians secretly retrieved and buried.

Tarbula's feast day is 4 April.

== Ritual execution ==
The death by saw execution of Tarbula and her companions was not only an ancient punishment but also seen as a powerful religious ritual by many ancient Middle Eastern peoples - capable of not only breaking the imagined spell on the queen, but also purify and/or bring luck and health to whomever passed between the victims remains.

The death of Tarbula and her companions therefore gains a strong symbolic message; that of faithful Christians not denouncing their faith or giving up their virtue even in the face of death. They become martyrs through their execution at the hands of non-Christians and sacrifice in a heathenish ritual.

== In the Arts ==
Tarbula is not widely featured in the arts but there are some notable examples such as;

A pieta engraved by Hieronymus Wierix

Martyrdom of St. Tarbula (ca. 1634) copper engraving by an unknown artist (possibly Adriaen Collaert) in' Sacrum Sanctuarium Crucis ' by Petro Bivero

Balthasar I Moretus depicted the Martyrdom of St. Tarbula with turbaned onlookers. The image reinforces the Christian theme of resurrection through Christ even after torture and death.

== See also ==
- Martyrs of Persia under Shapur II
- Death by sawing

== Works cited ==
- Dunbar, Agnes B.C. (1901). A Dictionary of Saintly Women. Vol. 2. London: George Bell & Sons.
- Jensen, Anne (1996). God's Self-Confident Daughters: Early Christianity and the Liberation of Women. Translated by Dean Jr., O.C. (1st ed.). Louisville, Kentucky: Westminster John Knox Press. ISBN 978-0-664-25672-2.

Dometius of Persia
