= Old English Martyrology =

9th-century literary collection

The Old English Martyrology is a collection of over 230 hagiographies, probably compiled in Mercia, or by someone who wrote in the Mercian dialect of the Old English language, in the second half of the 9th century.

The sources of the Old English Martyrology include the works of Bede, Aldhelm, Eddius, Adomnán, Gregory the Great, and Isidore of Seville, showing that the scribe had access to a significant library. He even have had access to the Syriac Acts of Mar Milus or an otherwise unknown Latin translation of it, since he includes the Persian martyr Milus of Susa (15 November). This work could have been brought to England by Theodore of Tarsus.

Five principal manuscripts survive, all fragmentary. Parts of January, and much of February and December are missing. The standard modern edition is by Günter Kotzor, Das altenglische Martyrologium (Abhandlungen der Bayerischen Akademie der Wissenschaften, volumes 88/1 and 88/2, 1981). Earlier editions, replaced by Kotzor's work, include Herzfeld's An Old English Martyrology (Early English Text Society, no. 116, 1900). An English translation by Christine Rauer became available in 2013.
