= Sapor, Isaac, Mahanes, Abraham, and Simeon =

Saints Sapor, Isaac, Mahanes, Abraham, and Simeon
- Born: Persia
- Died: 339
- Canonized: Pre-congregation
- Feast: 30 November

Saints Sapor, Isaac, Mahanes, Abraham, and Simeon (died 339 AD) were a group of Christians in Persia who were martyred under King Shapur II. Their feast day is 30 November.

== Monks of Ramsgate account ==
The monks of St Augustine's Abbey, Ramsgate wrote in their Book of Saints (1921),

Sapor, Isaac and others (SS.) MM. (Nov. 30)
(4th cent.) A band of Martyrs in Persia who endured savage torture and in the end were beheaded under Sapor II, the persecuting monarch (A.D. 339).

== Butler's account ==
The hagiographer Alban Butler (1710–1773) wrote in his Lives of the Fathers, Martyrs, and Other Principal Saints under November 30,

Saints Sapor and Isaac, Bishops, Mahanes, Abraham, and Simeon, MM.

IN the thirtieth year of Sapor II., the Magians accused the Christians to the king, with loud complaints, saying: “No longer are we able to worship the sun, nor the air, nor the water, nor the earth: for the Christians despise and insult them.” Sapor, incensed by their discourse against the servants of God, laid aside his intended journey to Aspharesa, and published a severe edict commanding the Christians everywhere to be taken into custody.

Mahanes, Abraham, and Simeon were the first who fell into the hands of his messengers. The next day the magians laid a new information before the king, saying: “Sapor, bishop of Beth-Nictor, and Isaac, bishop of Beth-Seleucia, build churches, and seduce many.” The king answered in great wrath: “It is my command that strict search be made to discover the criminals throughout my dominions, and that they be brought to their trials within three days.” The king’s horsemen immediately flew day and night in swift journeys over the kingdom, and brought up the prisoners, whom the magians had particularly accused; and they were thrown into the same prison with the aforesaid confessors.

The day after the arrival of this new company of holy champions, Sapor, Isaac, Mahanes, Abraham, and Simeon, were presented to the king, who said to them: “Have not you heard that I derive my pedigree from the gods? yet I sacrifice to the sun, and pay divine honours to the moon. And who are you who resist my laws, and despise the sun and fire?” The martyrs, with one voice, answered: “We acknowledge one God, and Him alone we worship.” Sapor said: “What God is better than Hormisdatas, or stronger than the angry Armanes? and who is ignorant that the sun is to be worshipped.” The holy bishop Sapor replied: “We confess only one God, who made all things, and Jesus Christ born of him.”

The king commanded that he should be beaten on the mouth; which order was executed with such cruelty, that all his teeth were knocked out. Then the tyrant ordered him to be beaten with clubs, till his whole body was bruised and his bones broken. After this he was loaded with chains. Isaac appeared next. The king reproached him bitterly for having presumed to build churches; but the martyr maintained the cause of Christ with inflexible constancy. By the king’s command several of the chief men of the city who had embraced the faith, and abandoned it for fear of torments, were sent for, and by threats engaged to carry off the servant of God, and stone him to death.

At the news of his happy martyrdom, St. Sapor exulted with holy joy, and expired himself two days after in prison, of his wounds. The barbarous king, nevertheless, to be sure of his death, caused his head to be cut off and brought to him. The other three were then called by him to the bar: and the tyrant finding them no less invincible than those who were gone before them, caused the skin of Mahanes to be flayed from the top of the head to the navel; under which torment he expired. Abraham’s eyes were bored out with a hot iron, in such a manner, that he died of his wounds two days after. Simeon was buried in the earth up to his breast, and shot to death with arrows. The Christians privately interred their bodies. The glorious triumph of these martyrs happened in the year 339. See their genuine Chaldaic acts in Steph. Evod. Assemani, Acta Mart. Orient. t. 1, p. 226.

== See also ==
- Martyrs of Persia under Shapur II

== Sources ==
- Butler, Alban (1866), The Lives of the Fathers, Martyrs, and Other Principal Saints, vol. 11, James Duffy This article incorporates text from this source, which is in the public domain.
- St. Augustine's Abbey, Ramsgate (1921), The Book of saints : a dictionary of servants of God canonized by the Catholic Church, London: A. & C. Black, ltd. This article incorporates text from this source, which is in the public domain.
