= Jonas and Barachisius =

Persian martyrs

Saints Jonas and Barachisius
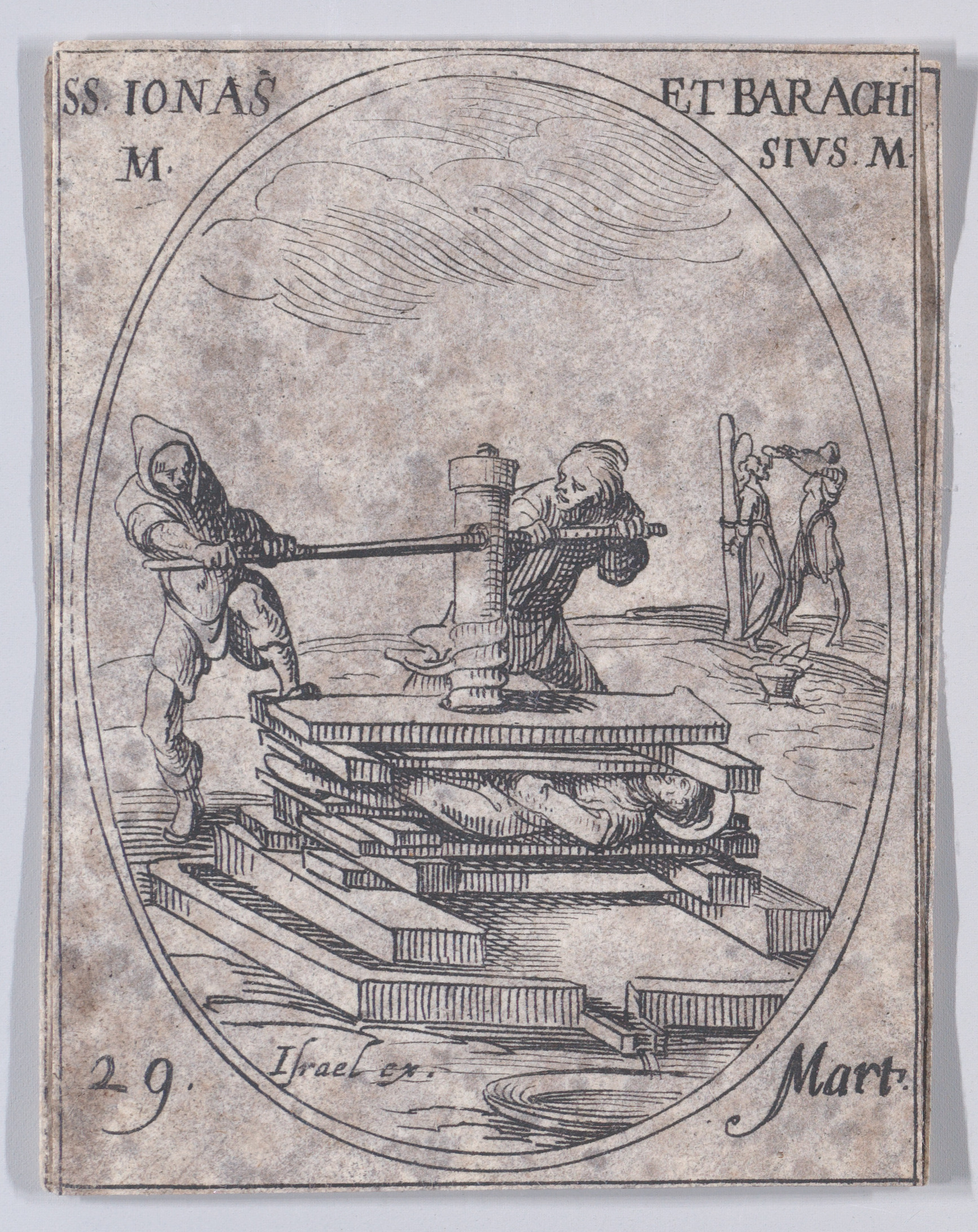
- 1636 depiction of the torture of Jonas and Barachisius from Les Images De Tous Les Saincts et Saintes de L'Année
- Born: Beth-Asa, Persia
- Died: 24 December 327; Hubaham, Persia
- Feast: 29 March

Saints Jonas and Barachisius (died 327), two brothers, were Persian martyrs during the persecutions of King Shapur II.

== Life ==
L. M Pétin in his Dictionnaire hagiographique (1850) says that Barachisius and his brother Jonas were from the town of Beth-Asa in Persia. When Shapur II started his persecution of the Christians in 327, they went to Hubaham to encourage the martyrs and were arrested in turn. The judge demanded that they renounce their faith but they refused, despite extreme tortures, and died on 24 December 327. Their feast day is 29 March.

== Monks of Ramsgate account ==
The monks of St Augustine's Abbey, Ramsgate wrote in their Book of Saints (1921),

Jonas, Barachisius and Others (SS.) MM. (March 29)
(4th cent.) King Sapor II of Persia, in the eighteenth year of his reign, raised a fierce persecution against the Christians. Among the sufferers were the two brothers, Jonas and Barachisius of the city of Beth-Asa. While travelling about and encouraging the Christians of his neighbourhood (nine of whom received the Crown of Martyrdom), they were arrested and after bravely enduring every form of torture, laid down their lives for Christ’s sake. They died A.D. 327..

== Butler's account ==
The hagiographer Alban Butler (1710–1773) wrote in his Lives of the Fathers, Martyrs, and Other Principal Saints under May 26,

Saints Jonas, Barachisius, and Their Companions, MM.

A.D. 327.

King Sapor, in the eighteenth year of his reign, raised a bloody persecution against the Christians, and demolished their churches and monasteries. Jonas and Barachisius, two brothers of the city Beth-Asa, hearing that several Christians lay under sentence of death at Hubaham, went thither to encourage and serve them. Nine of that number received the crown of martyrdom. After their execution, Jonas and Barachisius were apprehended for having exhorted them to die. The president mildly entreated the two brothers to obey the king of kings, meaning the king of Persia, and to worship the sun, moon, fire, and water. Their answer was, that it was more reasonable to obey the immortal King of heaven and earth, than a mortal prince. The Magians were much offended to hear their king called mortal. By their advice the martyrs were separated, and Barachisius was cast into a very narrow close dungeon. Jonas they detained with them, endeavouring to persuade him to sacrifice to fire, the sun, and water.

The prince of the Magians, seeing him inflexible, caused him to be laid flat on his belly with a stake under his navel, and to be beaten both with knotty clubs and with rods. The martyr all the time continued in prayer, saying: “I thank you, O God of our father Abraham. Enable me I beseech you to offer to you acceptable holocausts. One thing I have asked of the Lord: this will I seek after. The sun, moon, fire, and water I renounce: I believe and confess the Father, Son, and Holy Ghost.” The judge ordered him next to be set in a frozen pond, with a cord tied to his foot. After supper and a short nap he sent for Barachisius, and told him his brother had sacrificed. The martyr said it was impossible that he should have paid divine honours to fire, a vile creature, and spoke much on the immensity and power of God, and with such eloquence and force, that the Magians were astonished to hear him, and said one to another, that if he were permitted to speak in public, he would draw over many from their religion. Whereupon they concluded for the future to hold his interrogatories in the night. In the mean time they caused two red-hot iron plates, and two red-hot hammers, to be applied under each arm, and said to him: “If you shake off either of these, by the king’s fortune, you deny Christ.” He meekly replied: “I fear not your fire; nor shall I throw off your instruments of torture. I beg you to try without delay all your torments on me. He who is engaged in combat for God, is full of courage.” They ordered melted lead to be dropped into his nostrils and eyes; and that he should then be carried to prison, and there hung up by one foot.

Jonas, after this, being brought out of his pool, the Magians said to him: “How do you find yourself this morning? We imagine you passed the last night but very uncomfortably.” “No,” replied Jonas: “from the day I came into the world, I never remember a night more sweet and agreeable: for I was wonderfully refreshed by the remembrance of Christ’s sufferings.” The Magians said: “Your companion hath renounced.” The martyr, interrupting them, answered: “I know that he hath long ago renounced the devil and his angels.” The Magians urged: “Take care lest you perish, abandoned both by God and man.” Jonas replied: “If you are really wise, as you boast, judge if it be not better to sow the corn, than to keep it hoarded up. Our life is a seed sown, to rise again in the world to come, when it will be renewed by Christ in immortal light.” The Magians said: “Your books have drawn many aside.” Jonas answered: “They have indeed drawn many from worldly pleasures. When a servant of Christ is in his sufferings inebriated with love from the passion of his Lord, he forgets the transitory state of this short life, its riches, estates, gold, and honours; regardless of kings and princes, lords and noblemen, where an eternity is at stake, he desires nothing but the sight of the only true King, whose empire is everlasting, and whose power reaches to all ages.” The judges commanded all his fingers and toes to be cut off, joint by joint, and scattered about. Then they said to him: “Now wait the harvest to reap other hands from this seed.” To whom he said: “Other hands I do not ask. God is present, who first framed me, and who will give me new strength.” After this the skin was torn off the martyr’s head, his tongue was cut out, and he was thrown into a vessel of boiling pitch; but the pitch by a sudden ebullition running over the servant of God was not hurt by it. The judges next ordered him to be squeezed in a wooden press till his veins, sinews, and fibres burst. Lastly, his body was sawn with an iron saw, and, by pieces, thrown into a dry cistern.

Guards were appointed to watch the sacred relics, lest Christians should steal them away. The judges then called upon Barachisius to spare his own body. To whom he said: “This body I did not frame, neither will I destroy it. God its maker will again restore it; and will judge you and your king.” Hormisdatscirus, turning to Maharnarsces, said: “By our delays we affront the king. These men regard neither words nor torments.” They therefore agreed that he should be beaten with sharp pointed rushes; then that splinters of reeds should be applied to his body, and by cords strait drawn and pulled, should be pressed deep into his flesh, and that in this condition his body pierced all over with sharp spikes, armed like a porcupine, should be rolled on the ground. After these tortures, he was put into the screw or press, and boiling pitch and brimstone were poured into his mouth. By this last torment he obtained a crown equal to that of his brother. Under their most exquisite tortures they thought they bought heaven too cheap. Upon the news of their death, Abtusciatus, an old friend, came and purchased their bodies for five hundred drachms and three silk garments, binding himself also by oath never to divulge the sale. The acts are closed by these words: “This book was written from the mouths of witnesses, and contains the acts of the saints, Jonas, Barachisius, and others, martyrs of Christ, who by his succour fought, triumphed, and were crowned, in whose prayers we beg place may by found, by Esaias, son of Adabus of Arzun, in Armenia, of the troop of royal horsemen, who was present at their interrogatories and tortures, and who wrote the history of their conflicts.” They were crowned on the 29th of the moon of December. This was the 24th of that month, in the year of Christ 327, of Sapor II. the 18th. The Roman Martyrology mentions them on the 29th of March.

== See also ==
- Martyrs of Persia under Shapur II

== Sources ==
- Butler, Alban (1833), The Lives of the Fathers, Martyrs, and Other Principal Saint, vol. 1, Coyne This article incorporates text from this source, which is in the public domain.
- Pétin, L. M., Abbé (1850), Dictionnaire hagiographique ou Vie des saints et des bienheureux, honorés en tout temps et en tous lieux, depuis la naissance du christianisme jusqu'à nos jours ... (in French)
- St. Augustine's Abbey, Ramsgate (1921), The Book of saints : a dictionary of servants of God canonized by the Catholic Church, London: A. & C. Black, ltd. This article incorporates text from this source, which is in the public domain.
