= Gentile of Matelica =

Blessed Gentile of Matelica O.F.M.
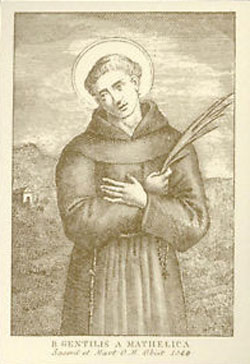
- Blessed Gentile Matelica O.F.M.
- Born: 1290; Matelica, Marche, Italy
- Died: 5 September 1340; Tabriz, Persia
- Venerated in: Latin Church; Franciscan Orders
- Beatified: 1795
- Major shrine: Basilica di Santa Maria Gloriosa dei Frari, Venice, Italy
- Feast: 7th of September
- Attributes: Franciscan Habit; Crucifix; Martyrs Palm

Gentile of Matelica was a 14th-century Italian Franciscan friar, priest, missionary, and martyr. Born in the town of Matelica in 1290 after time ministering in Italy he went on to undertake missions in Egypt and Persia and was martyred in Tabriz on 5 September 1340. His longstanding cult received papal approbation in 1795.

== Biography ==
He was a born to the noble Finaguerra family and as a youth joined the Order of Friars Minor. During his studies he was attracted to the ideas of the Spiritual Franciscans who wanted a stricter observance of the Rule inspired by the ideals of Francis of Assisi. Following his priestly ordination he retired to the life of a hermit at La Verna. Inspired by prayer he initially embarked on a preaching tour of the towns around Arezzo and his noted piety inspired his brethren to elect him Guardian of his Friary twice. Later his superiors gave him permission to work as a missionary among the Saracens, first in Egypt. Slow to learn Arabic he resolved to return to Italy but decided to remain following a vision after which he was able to speak all the local languages with fluency. He travelled widely also in Anatolia (modern Turkey) and made pilgrimage to the Dominical sites under the protection of the Province of the Holy Land.

In around 1321 he came to Persia to Tabriz where he joined the mission of his brethren Thomas of Tolentino and Peter of Siena. He reportedly experienced a great deal of success attracting large crowds to his sermons which were accompanied by miraculous flocks of birds to attract people from far and wide, and baptised many thousands of Saracens.

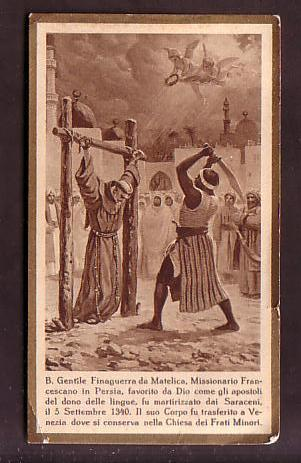
Gentile of Matelica's martyrdom

Gentile enjoyed a long-standing relationship with the Venetian Ambassador Marco Cornaro to whom he was an advisor. He correctly prophesied both Cornaro's illnesses and the fact he would later become Doge of Venice.

On 5 September 1340 Gentile was attacked by Muslim opponents in Tabriz and was martyred Sources dispute whether this occurred by clubbing to death or by beheading. His body was brought by Marco Cornaro to the Franciscan church in Venice, where his relics remain today (Santa Maria Gloriosa dei Frari).

== Veneration ==
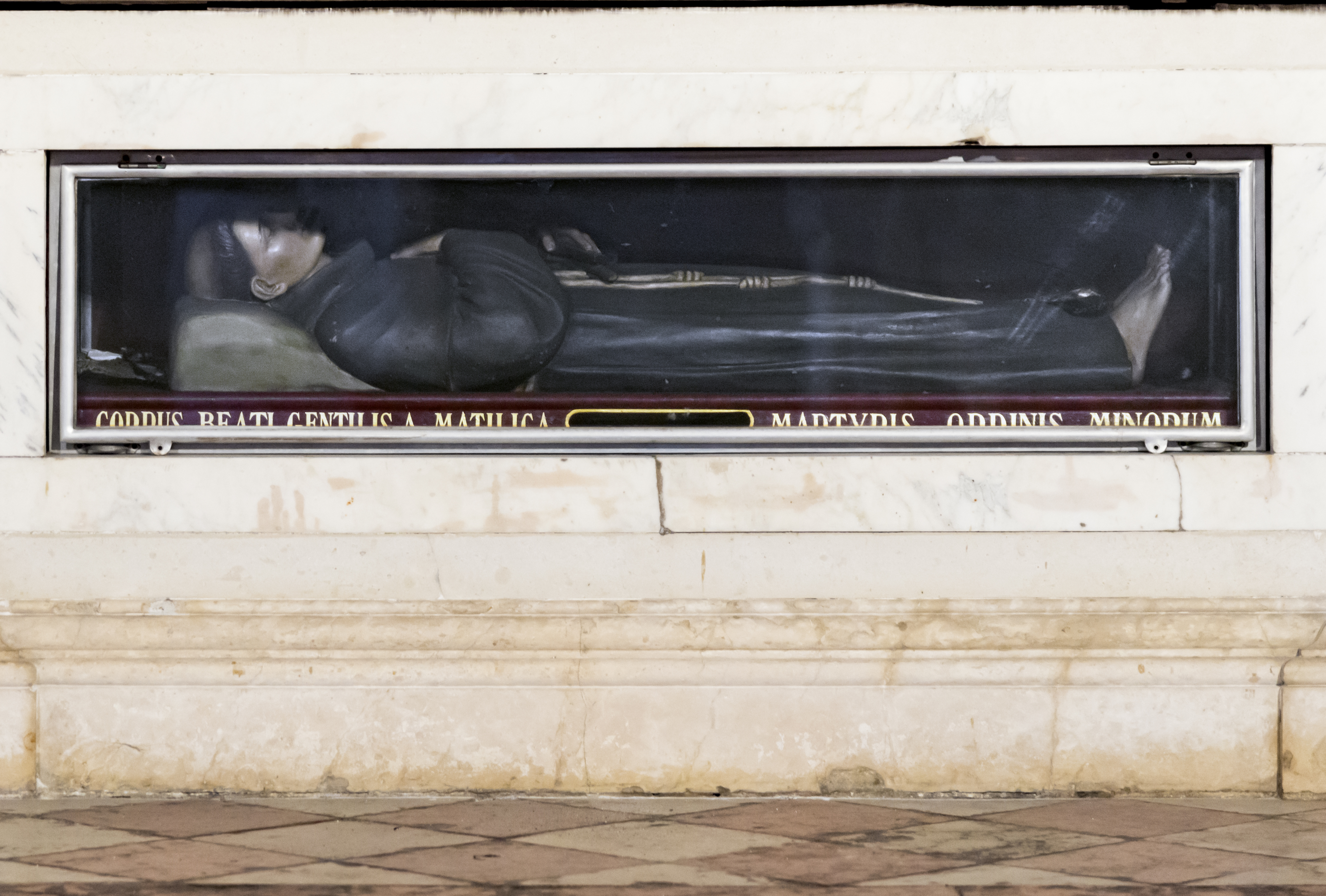
Effigy of Gentile in his shrine in Venice

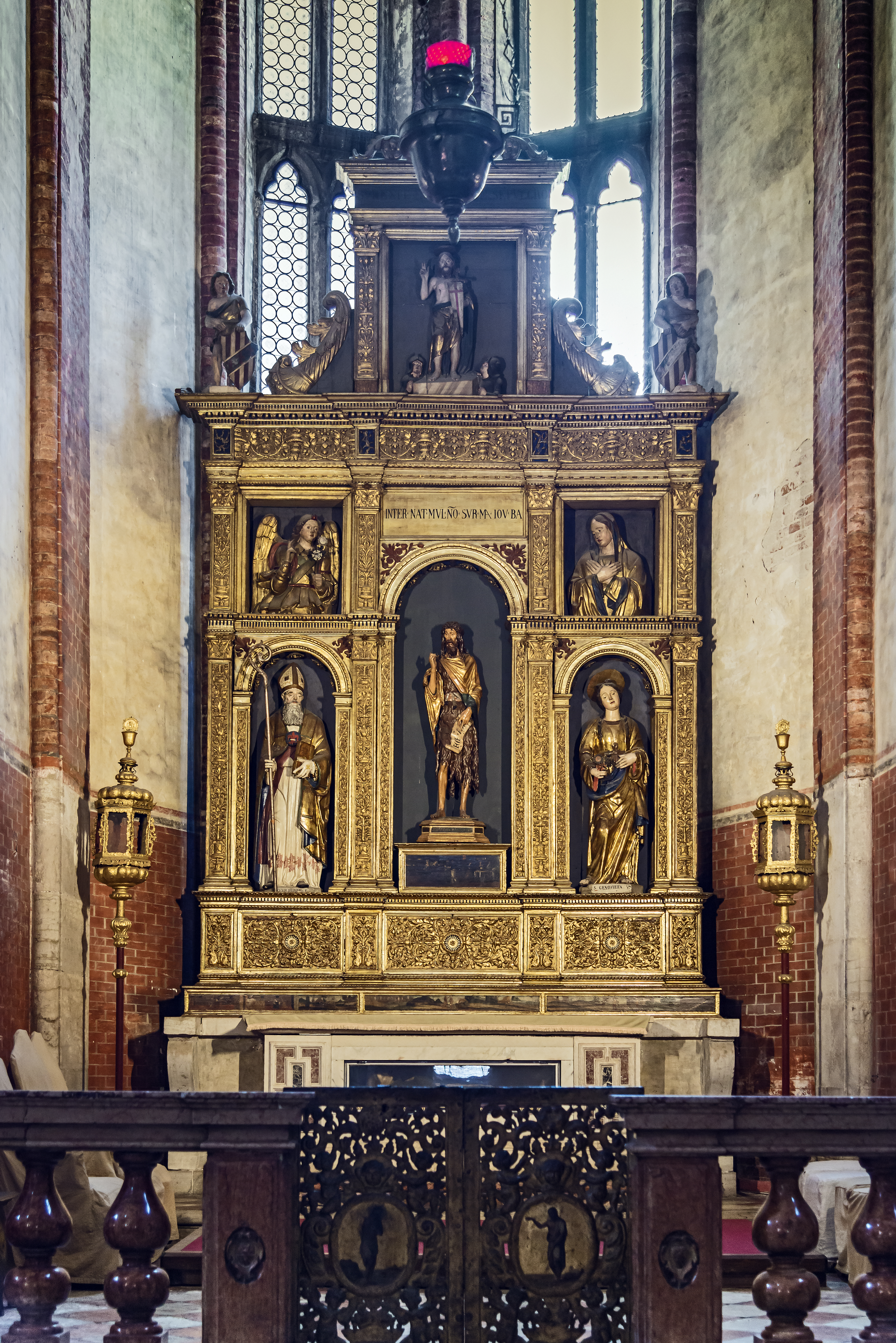
Cappella di San Giovani (Santa Maria Gloriosa dei Frari, Venice) containing the shrine of Blessed Gentile

Venerated by the Franciscans on 5 September for centuries following his death, his cult was finally recognised in 1795 through a concession of Pope Pius VI to celebrate his feast. Today he is celebrated on 7 September.

== See also ==
- Catholic Church in Iran
