= Acepsimas of Hnaita =

20th-century Christian bishop, martyr, and saint

Saint Acepsimas
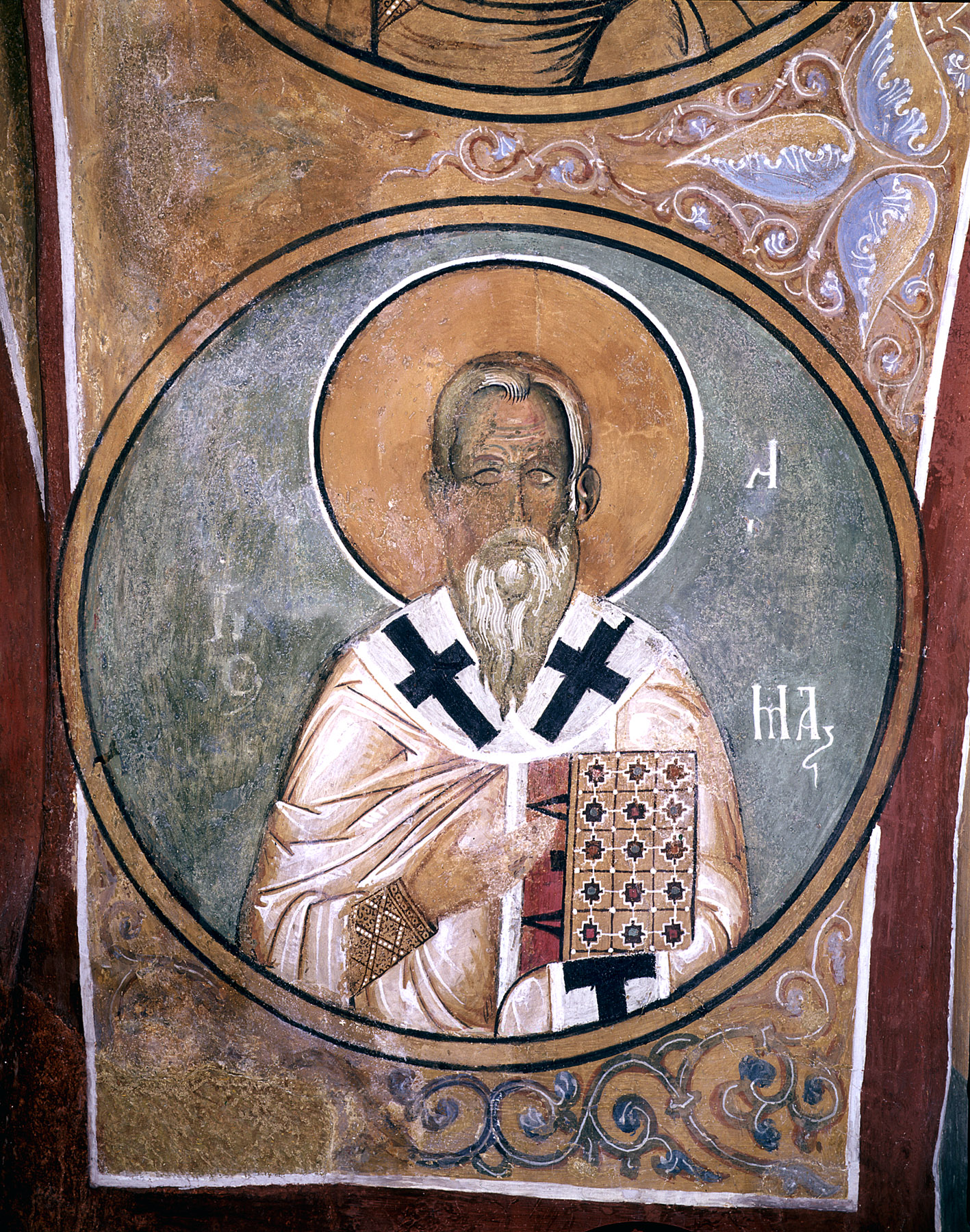

Bishop, Martyr
- Died: October 10, 376
- Venerated in: Syriac Orthodox Church; Eastern Orthodox church Roman Catholic Church
- Feast: November 3 in Greek Orthodox Church; April 22 in Roman Catholic Church; September 2 in Syriac Orthodox Church

Acepsimas of Hnaita (Syriac: ܥܩܒ݂ܫܡܐ) (died October 10, 376) was a bishop, martyr, and saint.

Acepsimas was one of the martyrs of Persia under Shapur II, and the martyrdom of Acepsimas was narrated in one of the Persian martyr acts, a collection of works of Syriac literature that narrate the Christians who were killed in the history of the Sasanian Empire for their Christian faith.

== Life ==
Acepsimas was the bishop of Hnaita, residing at Paka in western Persia. He and several companions, including the priest Joseph of Bet-Katoba, who was then 70 years old, and the deacon Aitillaha of Bet-Nuhadra, who was then 66 years old, were arrested by Shapur II for refusing to worship according to the Zoroastrian faith. Acepsimas was taken in chains to Arbela (modern Erbil) before the governor. This judge admired how he could deny the divinity of the sun, which all the East adored. The martyr answered him, expressing his astonishment how men could prefer a creature to the Creator. By the orders of the governor he was laid on the ground with his feet bound, and in that posture barbarously scourged, till his whole body was covered with blood. He was then thrown into prison.

Acepsimas endured three years of prison before he was racked and whipped to death on October 10, 376. Joseph was taken to Hdajab where he was tortured until he was stoned to death by apostate Christians at Tabaha on the Friday after Pentecost, 377. Aithalla was stoned to death at Destegerd on November 3, 377. They were the last martyrs of the Christian persecution of Shapur II. The book of their acts, which has survived, is said to be genuine.

== Veneration ==
Acepsimas and his companions are considered saints. The Roman Catholic Church keeps their feast on April 22. The Greek and Russian Orthodox Churches keep their feast with the full office of the day on November 3. The Syriac Orthodox Church keeps their feast on September 2. Aithalla has a feast in the Greek Orthodox Church held in his specific honor on September 1.

Other individuals who are recognized with this group include the bishop Abdjesus and a deacon named Abdjesu.

== See also ==
- Martyrs of Persia under Shapur II

== Sources ==
- Holweck, F. G. A Biographical Dictionary of the Saints. St. Louis, MO: B. Herder Book Co. 1924.
