= Martyrs of Persia under Shapur II =

Christian martyrs of the 4th century

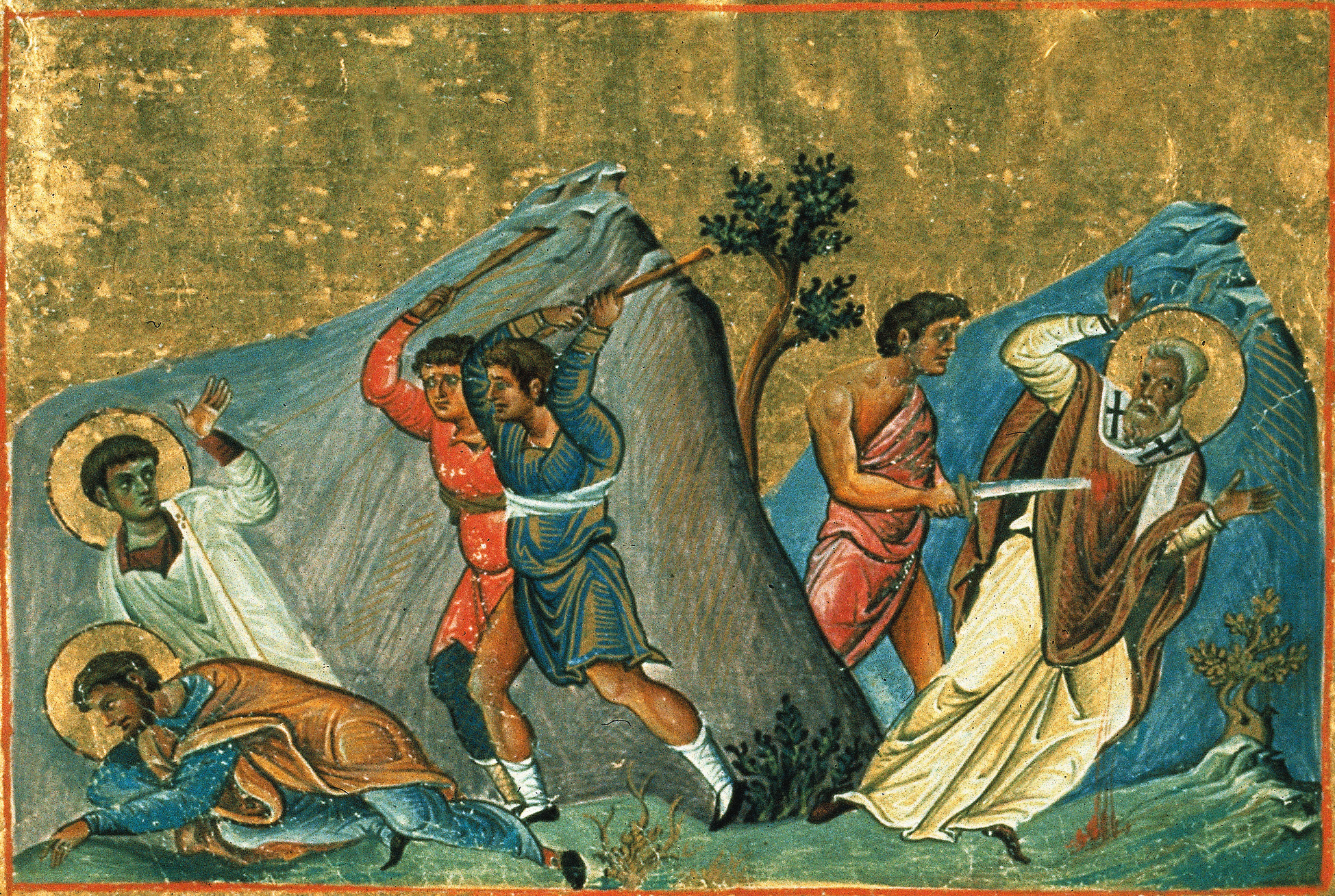
- Martyrdom of Miles (bishop of Susa) from the Menologion of Basil II (c. 1000)
- Born: 4th century Persia
- Died: 4th century Persia
- Feast: 6 April, 22 April and 9 May

The Martyrs of Persia under Shapur II were Christian martyrs who were put to death by Shapur II of Persia (r. 309–379) for failing to renounce their faith. Historical accounts suggest that approximately 16,000 Christians may have been martyred during this period. Accounts of individual martyrs through the history of the Persian empire, especially in Shapur II's time, were recorded across dozens of written Persian martyr acts. The martyrs are also remembered collectively in the Roman and Orthodox calendars, with the Roman Martyrology listing feast days on April 6, April 22, and May 9 for different groups of martyrs.

== Historical background ==
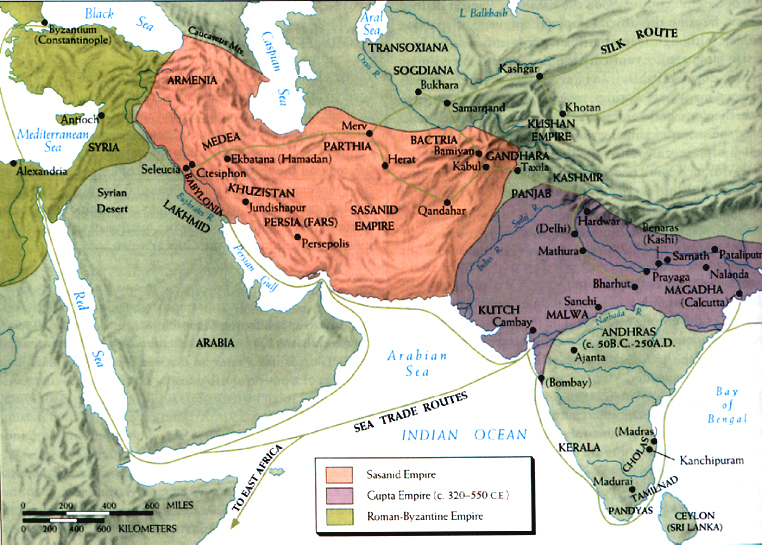
Sasanid empire

The standard view of early Christianity in Persia is that it was tolerated until Constantine the Great (r. 306–337) was converted to Christianity. In a letter to Shapur II, tansmitted by Eusebius in his Vita Constantini he asks Shapur to treat the Christians well. Shapur II then became suspicious of Christians in his empire, and after being defeated in a war with Rome ordering that the Christian churches be destroyed and their clergy executed. This was later extended to execution of all Christians. This view is based on Syriac accounts of martyrdoms which might exaggerate the extent.

The theme of Shapur's persecution being a reaction to Constantine's conversion emerged only during the reign of Theodosius II (r. 402–450), and must be treated with some skepticism. However, there is no doubt that Shapur II severely persecuted the Christians from 339 until his death in 379, and the 5th-century Syriac Passions most likely were the source for Sozomenos's account in his Ecclesiastical History, and have been carried forward into Greek translations.

== Sozomen's account ==
Sozomen (c. 400–450 AD) wrote in his Ecclesiastical History, Chapter XIV - Conduct and martyrdom of Milles the Bishop, multitude of bishops slain in Persia by Sapor, besides obscure individuals,

I shall briefly state that the number of men and women whose names have been ascertained, and who were martyred at this period, has been computed to be upwards of sixteen thousand, while the multitude of martyrs whose names are unknown was so great that the Persians, the Syrians, and the inhabitants of Edessa, have failed in all their efforts to compute the number.

== Monks of Ramsgate accounts ==
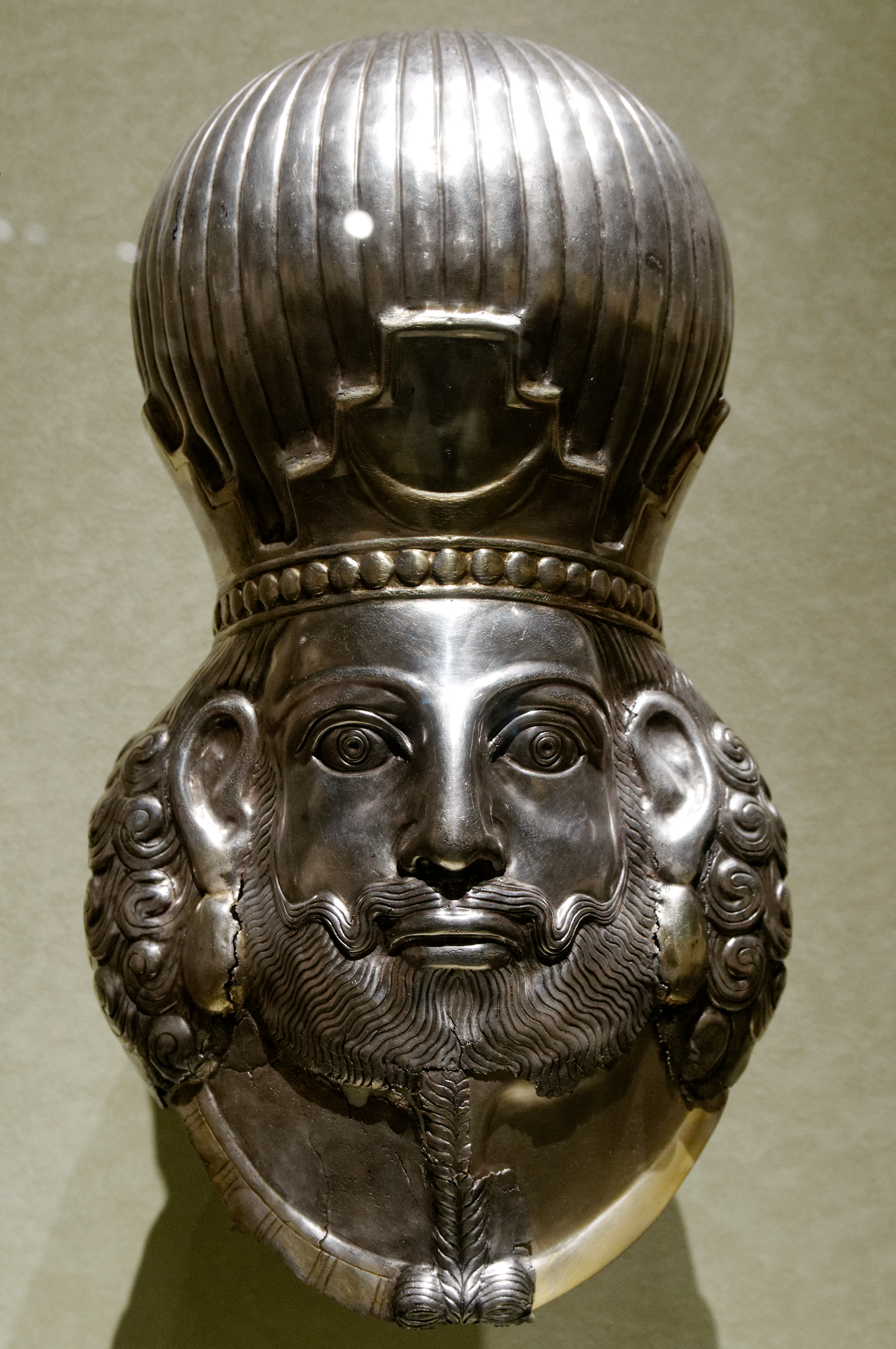
Bust of Shapur II (r. 309–379)

The Monks of Ramsgate wrote in their Book of Saints (1921),

Persia (Martyrs of) (SS.) (April 6)
(4th cent.) One hundred Christian soldiers, for the most part Greeks, made prisoners by the Persian King Sapor II in his war with the emperor Constantius. They were all put to the sword by the Pagans and have since been venerated as martyrs.

Persia (Martyrs of) (SS.) (April 22)
(4th cent.) On April 22 the Roman Church commemorates the Passion of a vast number of Christians, massacred in Persian under King Sapor II on Good Friday. A.D. 380. Among them were Milles, Acepsimas, Mareas, Bicor and twenty other Bishops, about two hundred and fifty priests and deacons, and very many monks and nuns.

Persia (Martyrs of) (SS.) (May 9)
(Date uncertain.) The Martyrologies register for May 9: "In Persia three hundred and ten Martyrs"; but give no indication of date. It is conjectured that they suffered in the fourth century under the persecuting King Sapor II, but nothing certain is known about this group. An old Persian writer estimates the Persian Martyrs during the reign of Sapor II at two thousand. This estimate may be considered as quite moderate. Sozomen the historian reckons them to have numbered sixteen thousand; but that the total was (as some assert) two hundred thousand seems exaggerated.

Aithelas (St.) M. (April 22)
(4th cent.) One of the band of Persian Martyrs of which the leader was St. Abdiesus.

Azadenes (St.) M. (April 22)
(4th cent.) A deacon among the Martyrs of Persia, venerated on this day with St. Abdiesus, St. Azades, &c. They suffered under King Sapor II (A.D.341).

Barbasceminus and others (SS.) MM. (Jan. 14)
(4th cent.) Barbasceminus, Bishop of Seleucia, was one of the most distinguished of the Persian Martyrs of the fourth century under the persecuting King Sapor II. The contemporary writer, St. Maruthas, has left us a vivid account of his sufferings and of those who with him gave their lives for Christ.

Daniel and Verda (SS.) Martyrs (Feb. 21)
(4th cent.) Persian Martyrs, greatly honoured in the East, who suffered under King Sapor II (A.D. 344).

Jonas, Barachisius and others (SS.) MM. (March 29)
King Sapor II of Persia, in the eighteenth year of his reign, raised a fierce persecution against the Christians. Among the sufferers were the two brothers, Jonas and Barachisius of the city of Beth-Asa. While travelling about and encouraging the Christians of his neighbourhood (nine of whom received the Crown of Martyrdom), they were arrested and after bravely enduring every form of torture, laid down their lives for Christ's sake. They died A.D.327.

Sapor, Isaac and others (SS.) MM. (Nov. 30)
(4th cent.) A band of Martyrs in Persia who endured savage torture and in the end were beheaded under Sapor II, the persecuting monarch (A.D. 339).

== Roman Martyrology ==
The Roman Martyrology includes:

6th April ... In Persia, 120 blessed martyrs, in 345.

22nd April. The same day, many holy martyrs who, the year following the death of Saint Simeon, and on the anniversary of the Passion of our Lord, were put to the sword for the name of Christ throughout Persia, under king Sapor. Among those who then suffered for the faith were the eunuch Azades, a favorite of the king; Milles, a bishop renowned for sanctity and miracles; the bishop Acepsimas, with one of his priests named James; also Aithalas and Joseph, priests; Azadan and Abdiesus, deacons, and many other clerics; Mareas and Bicor, bishops, with twenty other bishops, and nearly two hundred and fifty clerics; many monks and consecrated virgins, among whom was the sister of Saint Simeon, called Tarbula, with her maid-servant, who were both killed in a most cruel manner by being tied to stakes and sawed in twain.

9th May ... In Persia, 310 blessed martyrs.

== Butler's account ==
The hagiographer Alban Butler (1710–1773) wrote in his Lives of the Primitive Fathers, Martyrs, and Other Principal Saints, under April 22,

Saints Azades, Tharba, and Many Others, Martyrs in Persia

A.D. 341.

In the thirty-second year of king Sapor II, (which Sozomen and others from him call, by an evident mistake, the thirty-third,) on Good-Friday, which fell that year on the 17th day of April, according to our solar year, the same day on which Saint Simeon and his companions suffered, a most cruel edict was published in Persia, inflicting on all Christians the punishment of instant death or slavery, without any trial or form of judicature. The swords of the furious were every where unsheathed; and Christians looked upon slaughter as their glory, and courageously went out to meet it. They had even in this life the advantage of their enemies, who often trembled or were fatigued, while the persecuted professors of the truth stood unshaken. “The cross grew and budded upon rivers of blood,” says Saint Maruthas; “the troops of the saints exulted with joy, and, being refreshed by the sight of that saving sign, were themselves animated with fresh vigour, and inspired others continually with new courage. They were inebriated by drinking the waters of divine love, and produced a new offspring to succeed them.” From the sixth hour on Good-Friday to the second Sunday of Pentecost, that is, Low-Sunday, (the Syrians and Chaldeans calling all the space from Easter-day to Whitsunday, Pentecost,) the slaughter was continued without interruption. The report of this edict no sooner reached distant cities, than the governors threw all the Christians into prisons, to be butchered as soon as the edict itself should be sent them: and upon its arrival in any place, whoever confessed themselves Christians were stabbed, or had their throats cut upon the spot. The eunuch Azades, a very great favourite with the king, was slain on this occasion; but the king was so afflicted at his death, that he thereupon published another edict, which restrained the persecution from that time to the bishops, priests, monks, and nuns. Great numbers also of the soldiery were crowned with martyrdom, besides innumerable others throughout the whole kingdom. Sozomen computes the number at sixteen thousand; but an ancient Persian writer, published by Renaudot, makes it amount to two hundred thousand.

The queen, in the mean time, fell dangerously ill. The Jews, to whom she was very favourable, easily persuaded her that her sickness was the effect of a magical charm or spell, employed by the sisters of the blessed Simeon, to be revenged for their brother’s death. One was a virgin, called Tharba, whom Henschenius and Ruinart corruptly call, with the Greeks, Pherbuta. Her sister was a widow, and both had consecrated themselves by vow to God in a state of continency. Hereupon the two sisters were apprehended, and with them Tharba’s servant, who was also a virgin. Being accused of bewitching the queen, Tharba replied, that the law of God allowed no more of enchantment than of idolatry. And being told they had done it out of revenge, she made answer, that they had no reason to revenge their brother’s death, by which he had obtained eternal life in the kingdom of heaven: revenge being moreover strictly forbidden by the law of God. After this they were remanded to prison. Tharba, being extremely beautiful, one of her judges was enamoured of her. He therefore sent her word the next day, that if she would consent to marry him, he would obtain her pardon and liberty of the king. But she refused the offer with indignation, saying, that she was the spouse of Jesus Christ, to whom she had consecrated her virginity, and committed her life; and that she feared not death, which would open to her the way to her dear brother, and to eternal rest from pain. The other two judges privately made her the like proposals, but were rejected in the same manner. They hereupon made their report to the king, as if they had been convicted of the crime; but he not believing them guilty, was willing their lives should be spared, and their liberty restored to them, on condition they would offer sacrifice to the sun. They declared nothing should ever prevail on them to give to a creature the honour due to God alone; whereupon the Magians cried out, “They are unworthy to live by whose spells the queen is wasting in sickness.” And it being left to the Magians to assign their punishments, and determine what death they should be put to, they, out of regard to the queen’s recovery, as they pretended, ordered their bodies to be sawn in two, and half of each to be placed on each side of a road, that the queen might pass between them, which, they said, would cure her. Even after this sentence, Tharba’s admirer found means to let her know, that it was still in her power to prevent her death, by consenting to marry him. But she cried out with indignation: “Most impudent of men, how could you again entertain such a dishonest thought? For me courageously to die is to live; but life, purchased by baseness, is worse than any death.” When they were come to the place of execution, each person was tied to two stakes, and with a saw sawn in two; each half, thus separated, was cut into six parts, and being thrown into so many baskets, were hung on two forked stakes, placed in the figure of half crosses, leaving an open path between them; through which the queen superstitiously passed the same day. Saint Maruthas adds, that no sight could be more shocking or barbarous, than this spectacle of the martyrs’ limbs cruelly mangled, and exposed to scorn. They suffered in the year 341.

== Sources ==
- Butler, Alban (1821), The lives of the fathers, martyrs, and other principal saints This article incorporates text from this source, which is in the public domain.
- Efthymiadis, Stephanos (25 February 2020), The Ashgate Research Companion to Byzantine Hagiography: Volume II: Genres and Contexts, Taylor & Francis, ISBN 978-1-351-39327-0
- Smith, Kyle (19 January 2016), Constantine and the Captive Christians of Persia: Martyrdom and Religious Identity in Late Antiquity, Univ of California Press, ISBN 978-0-520-28960-4
- Sozomen (1855), The Ecclesiastical History of Sozomen: Comprising a History of the Church from A.D. 324 to A.D. 440, H.G. Bohn, ISBN 978-0-7905-6568-2
- St. Augustine's Abbey, Ramsgate (1921). The Book of saints : a dictionary of servants of God canonized by the Catholic Church. London: A. & C. Black, ltd. OCLC 671676136. This article incorporates text from this source, which is in the public domain.
- The Roman and British Martyrology: Now First Translated, Literally, from the Latin Ed, O'Neill and Duggan, 1846 This article incorporates text from this source, which is in the public domain.
