= Miles (bishop of Susa) =

Bishop of Susa

Saint Miles
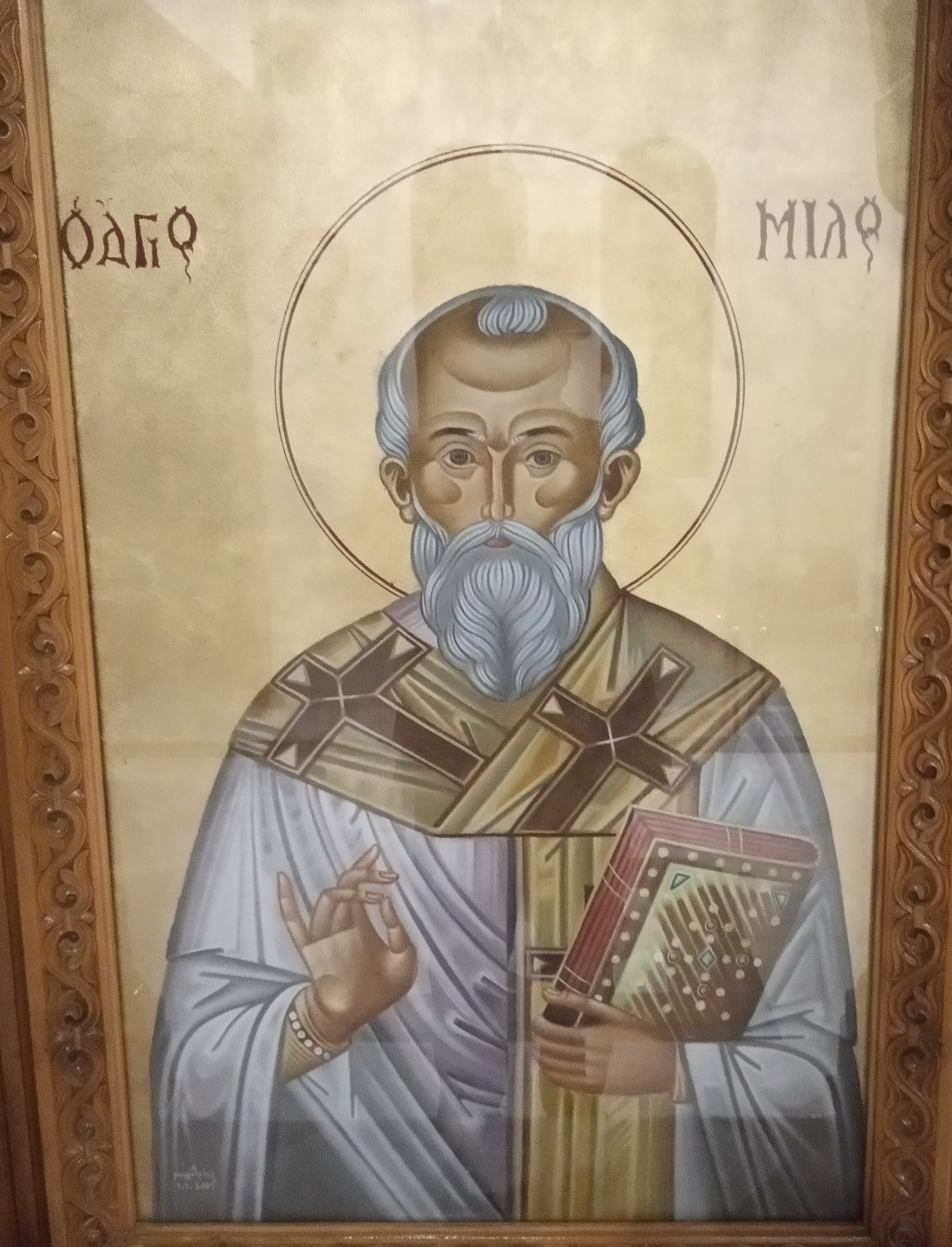
- Icon of Miles from a church dedicated to him in Patras

Bishop and Martyr
- Died: 340/341
- Venerated in: Eastern Orthodox Church; Oriental Orthodoxy; Roman Catholic Church
- Major shrine: Church of Saint Milos, Patras, Greece
- Feast: November 10

Miles (Syriac: ܡܝܠܣ, Greek: Μίλης), sometimes Mar Miles (Saint Miles), was a Persian Christian prelate who served as Bishop of Susa in Sasanian Persia from before 315 until his martyrdom in 340 or 341.

He engaged in efforts to evangelize Susa, traveled widely in the Eastern Roman Empire and led the opposition to Papa bar ʿAggai and the supremacy of the bishops of Seleucia-Ctesiphon in the Persian church. He was executed by the Sasanian authorities at the start of the Forty-Year Persecution.

Miles is mentioned in one of the Persian martyr acts contained in the Martyrology of 411. Sozomen in his Historia Ecclesistica, written in Constantinople in the first half of the 5th century, briefly summarizes a Syriac account of the life of Miles. Towards the end of the 6th century, a fuller Syriac hagiography appeared, the Acts of Miles or Martyrdom of Miles. His story also found its way into the Old English Martyrology.

== Name ==
Miles' name (Mynus) as it appears in the Old English Martyrology.

The name Miles is probably Persian (meaning "brave"), although it could be of Latin derivation (from miles, soldier). It was a common name in the Christian Church of the East in Persia and unknown in the Roman Empire. The Synodicon Orientale in manuscript BnF syr. 332 alone mentions seven bishops with that name, including the bishop of Susa. The Saint's name spelling has survived in different forms in various Christian martyrologies. In Old English, it appears as Mynus or Mylas. In modern English it may be rendered Milas or Milus.) In the Greek synaxaria it is found as Μίλλης (Millis, Milles), Μίλης (Milis, Miles) or Μίλος (Milos).

== Early life and travels ==
According to the Acts, Miles was a native of Susa. Before his conversion to Christianity, he was a Zoroastrian and served in the Sasanian army. He was consecrated bishop of Susa by Bishop Agapetus (Gadyahb) of Beth Lapaṭ (Gondeshapur). Miles traveled widely in the vicinity of Susa before going on a series of Christian pilgrimages. According to Sozomen, "failing in his efforts to convert the inhabitants [of Susa] to Christianity, he uttered imprecations against the city and departed". Not long after, continues Sozomen, the city incurred the king's wrath and was destroyed by an army with three hundred war elephants.

In his travels abroad, Miles took with him only the Gospels. He first stopped in Jerusalem; then the monastery of Saint Anthony in Egypt, where he met Amun, Anthony's successor; and finally Nisibis, where he helped Bishop Jacob construct the church that bears his name. Afterwards, he went to Seleucia-Ctesiphon, the capital of the empire.

It has been suggested, however, that Miles' travels as recorded in the Acts are "the defensive invention of history" by later dissidents opposed to the increasing authority of the bishops of Seleucia-Ctesiphon who sought to buttress their case by associating their hero, Miles, with some of the most famous people and names in the contemporary church.

== Meeting in Seleucia-Ctesiphon ==
End of Miles' entry in the Old English Martyrology, his name (spelled Mylas this time) highlighted in red.

Miles was the main opponent of the claims to primacy within the Persian church of Papa bar ʿAggai, the bishop of Seleucia-Ctesiphon. Their showdown at a synod in Seleucia-Ctesiphon in 315 is retold, in two contrasting versions, in the Acts of Miles and the Synodicon Orientale.

The account in the Synodicon is contained in a purported letter read into the record of the synod of Patriarch Dadishoʿ (424) by Bishop Agapetus. In this version, Papa was accused by some bishops of "violence and impurity" and Miles was sitting judgement on him. During the proceedings, Papa struck the Gospels in anger saying "Speak, Gospels, speak!" By divine judgement, he is struck down paralysed on one side (probably by a stroke). His situation was brought to the attention of the bishops of the Roman Empire (the fathers of the West), who sent a letter affirming the position of the bishop of Seleucia-Ctesiphon as head of the church in Persia and placing Papa's archdeacon Symeon bar Sebbaʿe in charge during the former's incapacity. The Western bishops reject Papa's trial because "only Christ can be the judge of a patriarch".

In the account in the Acts of Miles, Miles arrived in Seleucia-Ctesiphon to find the church in schism. He challenged Papa in a public meeting, bearing a copy of the Gospels to making his point. Papa responded by grabbing the Gospels and challenging them: "Speak then, Gospel, if you have anything to say." Before Papa was struck down (by a bolt of lightning in this account), Miles explained to the crowd that God would punish him for his pride.

There is no record in Roman sources of an appeal from a Persian bishop. The letter of the Roman bishops is most likely a fabrication from the reign of the Patriarch Joseph (552–567). There is, however, no reason to doubt the tradition of a confrontation between Papa and the bishops led by Miles over authority in the Persian church.

== Martyrdom ==
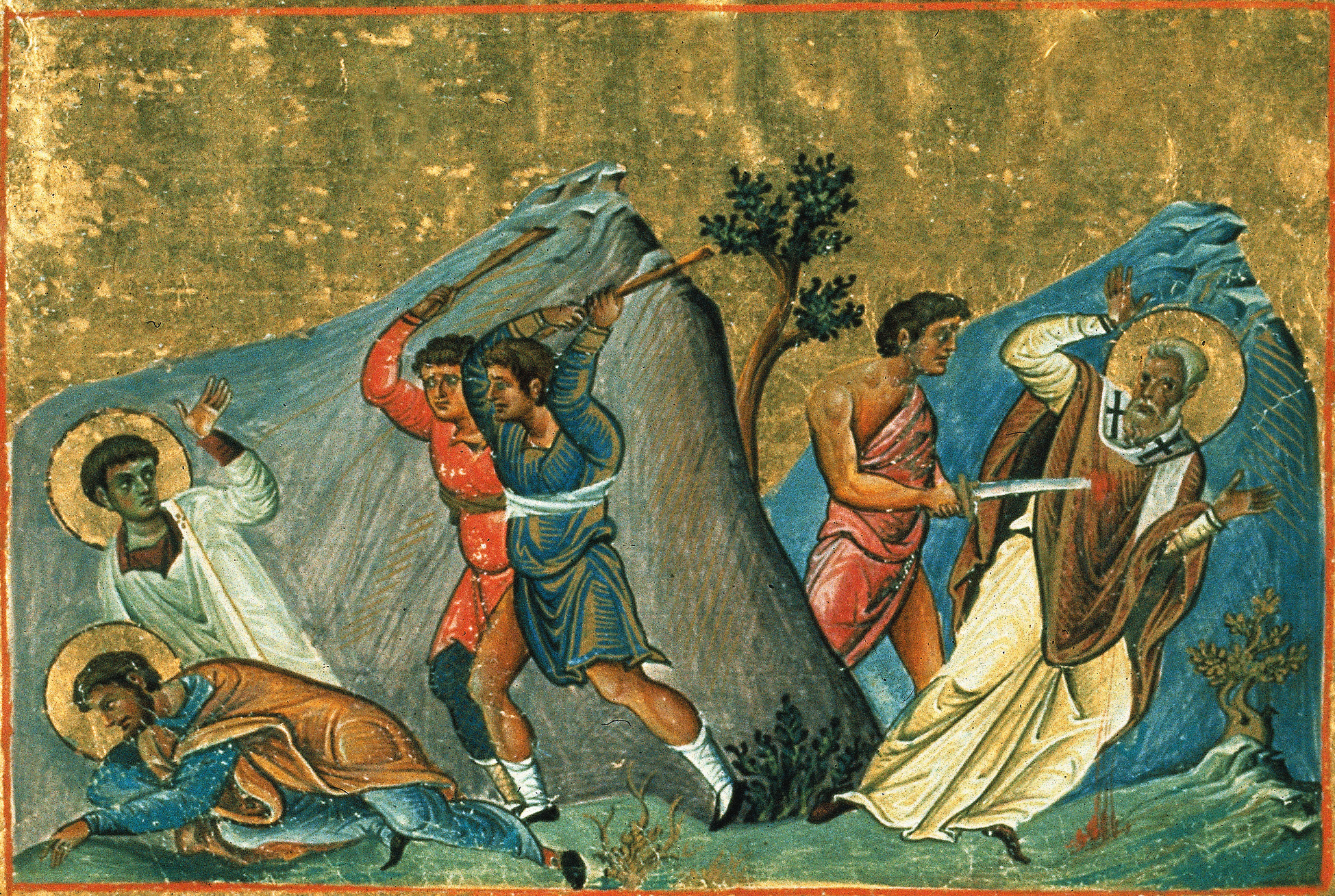
Martyrdom of Miles from the Menologion of Basil II (c. 1000)

The surviving version of the Acts of Miles was probably written in the late 6th century. It contains numerous fantastical elements that make separating fact from fiction difficult. Jérôme Labourt suggested, on the basis of the inclusion of Miles' otherwise unknown companions at the end, that it may combine traditions associated with several different martyrs.

According to the Acts, after Miles left Seleucia-Ctesiphon he went about performing miracles. He was arrested by Shah Shapur II at the start of the great persecution (340 or 341) and executed at Ray (Beth Rāziqāyē). He was buried at a place called Malcan alongside his companions Aborsima and Sina. Owing to the saint's protection, Malcan later became an impregnable fortress. Miles, Aborsima and Sina are among the 120 named Persian martyrs in what is the earliest dated Syriac manuscript, the Martyrology of 411.

A Syriac copy of the Acts seems to have made its way to England, possibly among the possessions of Theodore of Tarsus. Miles was included in the Old English Martyrology (late 9th century) under November 15 in an account clearly derived from the Syriac. The Acts was never translated into Greek. It is possible that it was translated into Latin in the lost martyrology of Acca of Hexham, which was a source for the Old English Martyrology.

The story of Miles was known in the Greek world, however. An account is found in the late 9th-century Synaxarion of Constantinople. The Menologion compiled for the Emperor Basil II around 1000 contains a depiction of the martyrdom of Miles, Aborsima (Eubores) and Sina (Sebon) for November 13. The iambic calendar of Christopher of Mytilene (early 11th century) contains the same three (Miles, Eubores and Senoi) plus Papas.

There was a monastery dedicated to Miles at Lycaonia in Asia Minor in 596, when Pope Gregory the Great wrote a letter in Latin to its abbot, Athanasius, absolving him of heresy. The only church in Europe dedicated to Miles is in Patras, Greece, built after a miracle was attributed to him there in 1939.

== See also ==
- Martyrs of Persia under Shapur II

== Sources ==
- Bakogiannis, Vasilios (2016). "How an Unknown Fourth-Century Persian Saint Became Famous in 1939 Greece". Mystagogy Resource Center. Translated by John Sanidopoulos.
- Chabot, J.-B. (1902). Synodicon orientale, ou Recueil de synodes Nestoriens, publié, traduit et annoté d'après le ms. syriaque 332 de la Bibliothèque nationale et le ms. K. VI, 4 du Musée Borgia, à Rome. Paris.
- Di Rienzo, Nunzia (2017). "Risemantizzare la memoria: Il conflitto tra Papa bar Aggai e Miles di Susa nell'ottica del catholicos di Seleucia" (PDF). Cristianesimo Nella Storia. 38 (3): 637–654.
- Follieri, Enrica (1959). "Il calendario giambico di Cristoforo di Mitilene secondo i mss. Palat. gr. 383 e Paris. gr. 3041". Analecta Bollandiana. 77 (3–4): 245–304. doi:10.1484/J.ABOL.4.01932.
- Gero, Stephen (1982). "The See of Peter in Babylon: Western Influences on the Ecclesiology of Early Persian Christianity". In Nina G. Garsoïan; Thomas F. Mathews; Robert W. Thomson (eds.). East of Byzantium: Syria and Armenia in the Formative Period. Dumbarton Oaks. pp. 45–51. ISBN 978-0-88402-104-9.
- Hutter, Irmgard (2007). "Das Oxforder „Bildmenologion"". In Martin Hinterberger; Elisabeth Schiffer (eds.). Byzantinische Sprachkunst: Studien zur byzantinischen Literatur gewidmet Wolfram Hörandner zum 65. Geburtstag. De Gruyter. pp. 143–180. doi:10.1515/9783110918229.143. ISBN 978-3-11-019501-9.
- Lapidge, Michael (2005). "Acca of Hexham and the Origin of the Old English Martyrology". Analecta Bollandiana. 123 (1): 29–78. doi:10.1484/j.abol.4.00189.
- "Miles, bishop and martyr in Persia, ob. c. 340". The Cult of Saints in Late Antiquity: From Its Origins to circa AD 700, Across the Entire Christian World. University of Oxford. 2017.
- Mullen, Roderic L. (2004). The Expansion of Christianity: A Gazetteeer of Its First Three Centuries. Brill.
- Nicodemus (2005) [1819]. Συναξαριστης: των δωδεκα μηνων του ενιαυτου [Synaxaristis: ton dodeka minon tou eniaftou]. Vol. 1. Ekdoseis Domos.
- Rauer, Christine, ed. (2013). The Old English Martyrology: Edition, Translation and Commentary. D. S. Brewer.
- Saint-Laurent, Jeanne-Nicole Mellon; Michelson, David A.; Gibson, Nathan P., eds. (2016). "Miles, bishop of Sus — ܡܝܠܣ". Qadishe: A Guide to the Syriac Saints. The Syriac Biographical Dictionary, Vol. 1. Syriaca.org.
- Smith, Kyle (2016). Constantine and the Captive Christians of Persia: Martyrdom and Religious Identity in Late Antiquity. University of California Press.
- Sozomen (1855). The Ecclesiastical History of Sozomen, Comprising a History of the Church from A.D. 324 to A.D. 440. Translated by Edward Walford. London: Henry G. Bohn.
- Stevenson, Jane (1998). "Ephraim the Syrian in Anglo-Saxon England" (PDF). Hugoye: Journal of Syriac Studies. 1 (2): 253–272. doi:10.31826/hug-2010-010116. S2CID 188096286.
- Wilmshurst, David (2011). The Martyred Church: A History of the Church of the East. East and West Publishing.
- Wood, Philip (2013). The Chronicle of Seert: Christian Historical Imagination in Late Antique Iraq. Oxford University Press.
