= Maruthas of Martyropolis =

5th century Christian Saint

Saint Maruthas
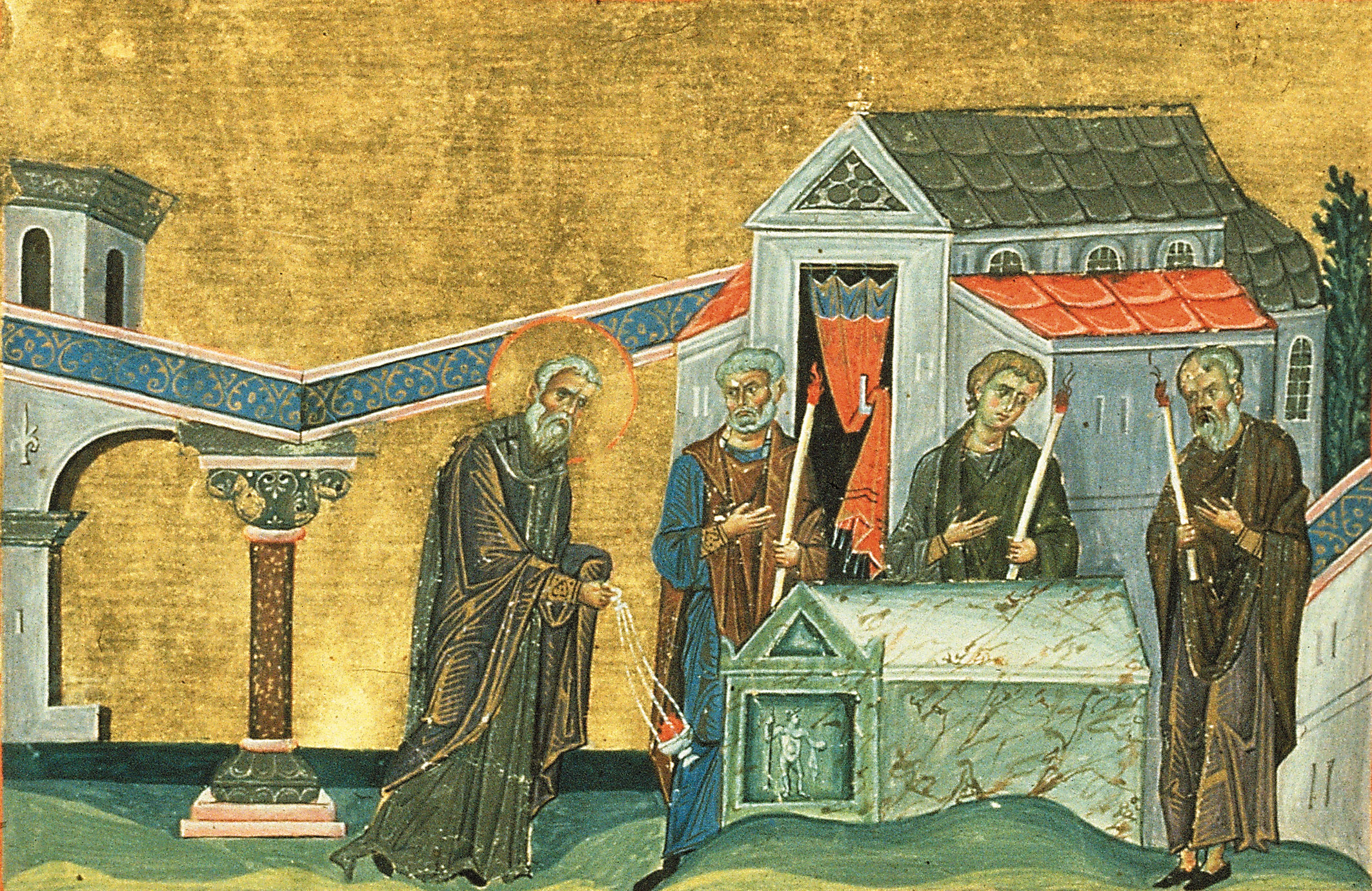
- Maruthas portrayed in the Menologion of Basil II

Father of the Syrian Church
- Born: c. 4th century AD
- Died: c. 420 AD
- Venerated in: Roman Catholicism; Eastern Catholicism; Eastern Orthodoxy; Oriental Orthodoxy
- Feast: 4 December (Roman Catholic Church)

Maruthas or Marutha of Martyropolis was a Syriac monk who became bishop of Maypherkat in Mesopotamia (Meiafarakin) for a period beginning before 399 up to around 410. He is believed to have died before 420. He is venerated as a saint in the Catholic, Greek Orthodox and Oriental Orthodox Churches, his feast being kept on 4 December.

He brought into his episcopal city the relics of so many martyrs that it received the Greek moniker Martyropolis. During his tenure as bishop he was a friend of Byzantine churchman John Chrysostom. Moreover, it was through this political connections he was able to act as an envoy and ambassador between the East Roman Emperor and the Persian Emperor.

In the interests of the Church of Persia, which had suffered much in the persecution of Shapur II, he came to Constantinople, but found Emperor Arcadius too busily engaged in the affairs about the exile of St. John Chrysostom. Later Maruthas was sent by Emperor Theodosius II to the court of Persia, where, notwithstanding the Magi, he won the esteem of King Yazdegerd I of Persia by his affability, saintly life, and, as is claimed, by his knowledge of medicine. Marutha therefore managed to negotiate a peace between the two empires.

He was present at the general First Council of Constantinople in 381 and at a Council of Antioch in 383 (or 390), at which the Messalians were condemned. For the benefit of the Persian Church he is said to have held two synods at Ctesiphon. A great organizer, he was one of the first to give a regular structure to the church, helped in his mission by the catholicos Isaac.

His writings include:

- Acts of the Persian Martyrs (these acts remember the victims of the persecution of Shapur II and Yazdegerd I)
- History of the Council of Nicaea
- A translation in Syriac of the canons of the Council of Nicaea
- A Syrian liturgy, or anaphora
- Commentaries on the Gospels
- Acts of the Council of Seleucia-Ctesiphon

He also wrote hymns on the Holy Eucharist, on the Cross, and on saints killed in Shapur's persecution.
