= November 5 (Eastern Orthodox liturgics) =

Day in the Eastern Orthodox liturgical calendar

Eastern Orthodox liturgical calendar
| November 4 | November 5 | November 6 |
November 5 O.S. ≍ November 18 N.S. November 5 N.S ≍ October 23 O.S.

An Eastern Orthodox cross

November 5 in Eastern Orthodox liturgical calendars is a feast day and a day of commemoration of saints and martyrs. Although some Orthodox churches use the Revised Julian Calendar and others use the traditional Julian calendar, the fixed commemorations for their respective November 5 are broadly the same, no matter which calendar is used. (Note: Despite the dates being the same, the days to which they refer typically differ by 13 days. The notation Old Style or O.S. is sometimes used to indicate a date in the traditional Julian Calendar (the "Old Calendar"). The notation New Style or N.S. indicates a date in the Revised Julian calendar (the "New Calendar").)

== Saints ==
- Apostles Patrobus, Hermas, Linus, Gaius, and Philologus, of the Seventy (1st century) (see also: November 4, January 4)
- Martyrs Galacteon and his wife Episteme at Emesa (253) (Note: "At Emesa, in Phoenicia, during the persecution of Decius, the holy martyrs Galation, and Epistemis, his wife, who were scourged, had their hands, feet and tongue severed from their bodies, and finally consummated their martyrdom by decapitation.")
- Martyrs Domninus, Timothy, Theophilus, Theotimus, Dorotheus, Eupsychius, Carterius, Silvanus, Pamphilius, Philotheos, Nearchos and other martyrs of Palestine (307) (Note: "Also, the holy martyrs Domninus, Theotimus, Philotheus, Silvanus, and their companions, under the emperor Maximinus.") (see also: November 15)
- Martyr Castor the Bishop, by fire, and Martyr Agathangelus, by the sword.
- Saint Domentius and Paul the Bishop. (Note: These are absent from the Synaxaria. However they are referenced in the Jerusalemitic Canonarion.)
- Venerable Gregory, Patriarch of Alexandria, Confessor (9th century)

== Pre-Schism Western saints ==
- Saint Felix and Eusebius, martyrs in Terracina, between Rome and Naples in Italy (1st century) (Note: "At Terracina, in Campania, the birthday of the holy martyrs, Felix, priest, and Eusebius, monk. The latter having buried the holy martyrs Julian and Caesarius, and converted to the faith of Christ, many whom the priest St. Felix baptized, was arrested with him, and both being led to the tribunal of the judge, who could not succeed in intimidating them, they were shut up in prison, and as they refused to offer sacrifice, were beheaded that same night.")
- Saint Domninus, first Bishop of Grenoble in France (4th century)
- Saint Dominator, fourteenth Bishop of Brescia in Lombardy in Italy (c. 495)
- Saint Fibitius, Abbot of a monastery in Trier in Germany, and the twenty-first bishop of that city (c. 500) (Note: "At Treves, St. Fibitius, who was made bishop of that city while filling the office of abbot.")
- Saint Magnus, Archbishop of Milan in Italy from 520 to 525, Confessor (525) (Note: "At Milan, St. Magnus, bishop and confessor.")
- Saint Laetus, a monk at the age of twelve, he is honoured near Orleans in France, his relics enshrined in the village of Saint-Lyé-la-Forêt (533) (Note: "At Orleans, in France, St. Lsetus, priest and confessor.")
- Saint Cybi (Kybi, Kebius, Cuby), Abbot, of Cornwall and Wales (550) (Note: Rev. Richard Stanton lists "St. Kybi, or Kebius" on November 6, as follows: "ST. KYBI was the son of Saloman, King of Brittany, and member of a family which produced several Saints in the Church of God. Kybi early in life devoted himself to the ecclesiastical state, and is said to have been consecrated Bishop by St. Hilary of Arles; but he fled from the honours due to him in his own country, and visited Great Britain and Ireland. Finally he settled himself in Anglesey, and became the Apostle of that island, where he ended his days in peace.") (see also: November 8)
- Saint Hermenegild, a monk at Salcedo in Galicia in Spain (586)
- Saint Augustine and Paulinus, monks sent by St Benedict to found the monastery of Terracina in Italy (6th century)
- Saint Kea (Kay, Kenan), Bishop of Devon and Cornwall (6th century) (Note: A saint who gave his name to Landkey in Devon, now in England. He spent some of his life in Brittany where he is venerated as St Quay.)
- Saint Bertilla (Berthild of Chelles), a nun at Jouarre near Meaux in France, who became Abbess of Chelles Abbey (c. 705)
- Saint Spinulus (Spinula, Spin), a monk at Moyenmoutier with St Hidulf, later founder of the monastery of Bégon-Celle (now Saint-Blasien) (707 or 720)
- Saint Kanten (Cannen), founder of Lianganten in Powys in Wales (8th century)
- Saint Odrada, Virgin, of Balen, Netherlands (8th century)
- Saint Gregory, a monk at Cassano, Calabria (1002) (see also: November 4)

== Post-Schism Orthodox saints ==
- Saint Jonah, Archbishop of Novgorod (1470) (Note: See: (in Russian) Иона (архиепископ Новгородский). Википедии. (Russian Wikipedia).)
- Saint Hilarion, Recluse, of Troekurovo (1853)
- Saint Dositheus, monk of Glinsk Hermitage (1874)

=== New martyrs and confessors ===
- New Hieromartyr Gabriel Maslennikov, Priest of Ryazan (1937) (Note: See: (in Russian) Масленников, Гавриил Михайлович. Википедии. (Russian Wikipedia).)

== Other commemorations ==
- Consecration of the Church of Theodore Tyron, in the "Sforakio" district of Constantinople. (Note: The complex represents one of the most important examples of Comnenian and Palaiologan architecture of Constantinople.)
- Election to the patriarchal throne of St. Tikhon, Patriarch of Moscow and All Rus (1917)
- Repose of Abbess Anna of Vraćevšnica monastery, Serbia (1975)
- Repose of Hieromonk Raphael (Ogorodnikov) of Porkhov, Pskov (1988)

== Icon gallery ==
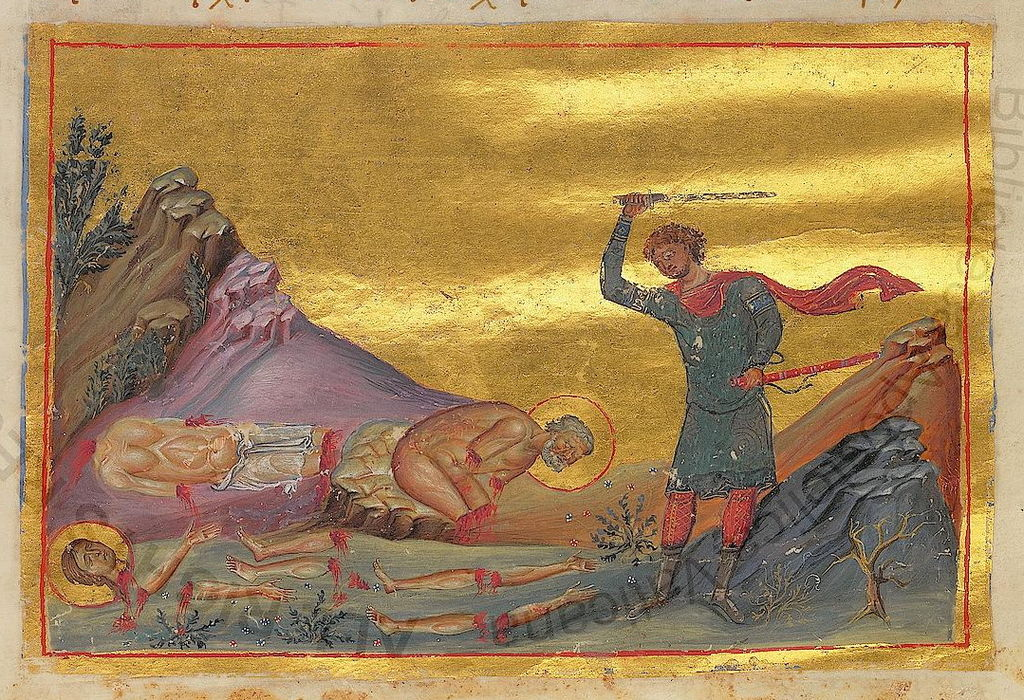
Martyrs Galacteon and his wife Episteme at Emesa.
(Menologion of Basil II, 10th century).

Martyrs Domninus, Timothy, Theophilus, Theotimus, Dorotheus, Eupsychius, Carterius, Silvanus, Pamphilius, Philotheos, Nearchos and other martyrs of Palestine.
(Menologion of Basil II, 10th century).

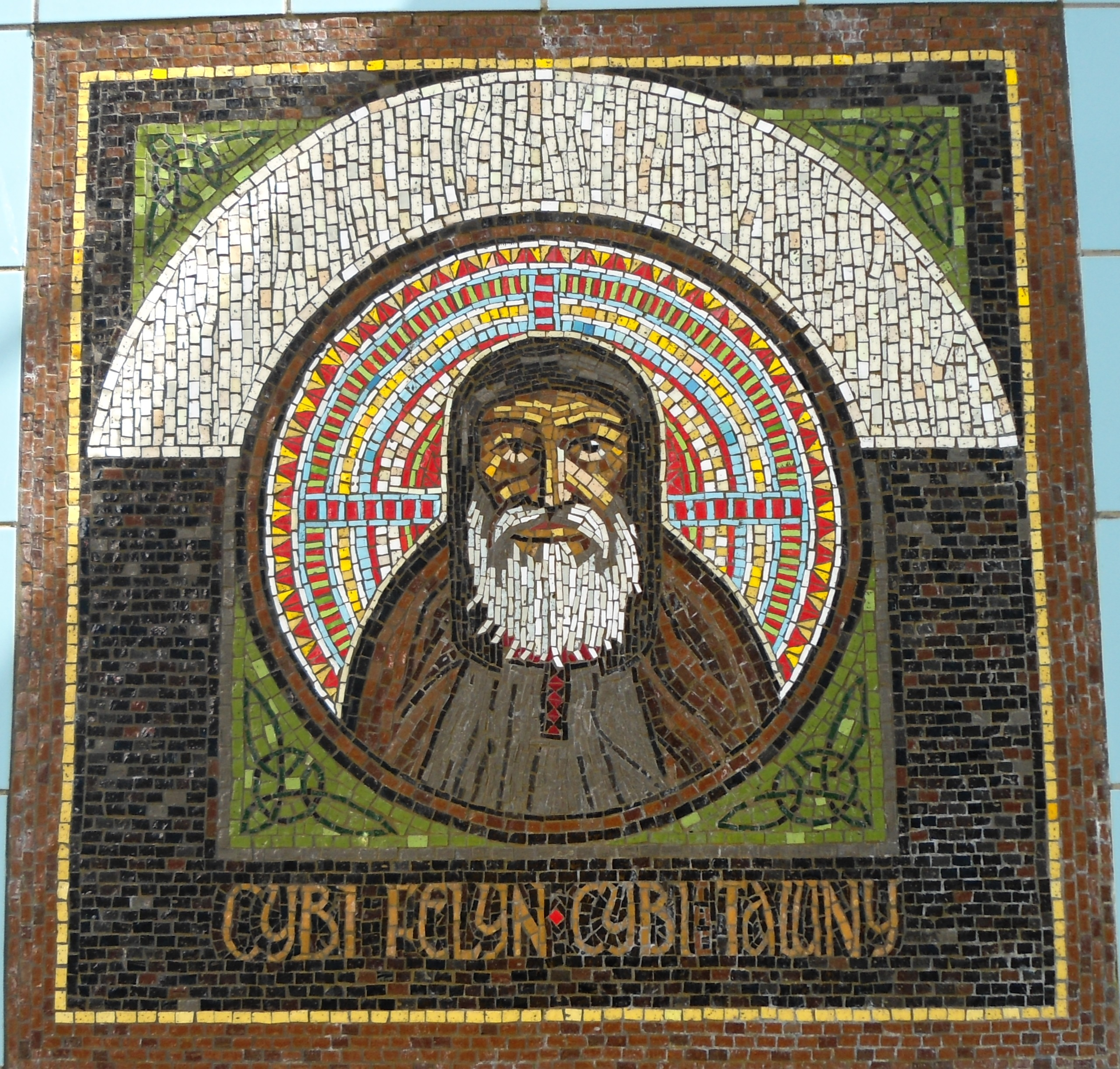
Saint Cybi, Abbot, of Cornwall and Wales.

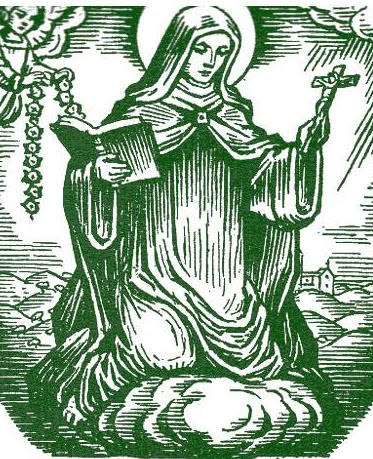
St Bertilla, Abbess of Chelles Abbey.

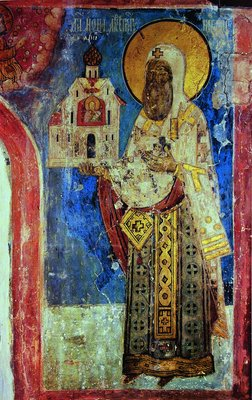
St. Jonah, Archbishop of Novgorod.

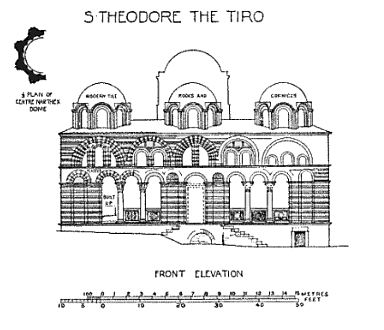
Church of Theodore Tyron, in the "Sforakio" district of Constantinople.

== Sources ==
- November 5/November 18. Orthodox Calendar (PRAVOSLAVIE.RU).
- November 18 / November 5. HOLY TRINITY RUSSIAN ORTHODOX CHURCH (A parish of the Patriarchate of Moscow).
- November 5. OCA - The Lives of the Saints.
- The Autonomous Orthodox Metropolia of Western Europe and the Americas (ROCOR). St. Hilarion Calendar of Saints for the year of our Lord 2004. St. Hilarion Press (Austin, TX). p. 83.
- The Fifth Day of the Month of November. Orthodoxy in China.
- November 5. Latin Saints of the Orthodox Patriarchate of Rome.
- The Roman Martyrology. Transl. by the Archbishop of Baltimore. Last Edition, According to the Copy Printed at Rome in 1914. Revised Edition, with the Imprimatur of His Eminence Cardinal Gibbons. Baltimore: John Murphy Company, 1916. p. 342.
- Rev. Richard Stanton. A Menology of England and Wales, or, Brief Memorials of the Ancient British and English Saints Arranged According to the Calendar, Together with the Martyrs of the 16th and 17th Centuries. London: Burns & Oates, 1892. p. 526.

Greek Sources

- Great Synaxaristes: (in Greek) 5 ΝΟΕΜΒΡΙΟΥ. ΜΕΓΑΣ ΣΥΝΑΞΑΡΙΣΤΗΣ.
- (in Greek) Συναξαριστής. 5 Νοεμβρίου. ECCLESIA.GR. (H ΕΚΚΛΗΣΙΑ ΤΗΣ ΕΛΛΑΔΟΣ).
- (in Greek) 05/11/2015. Ορθόδοξος Συναξαριστής.

Russian Sources

- (in Russian) 18 ноября (5 ноября). Православная Энциклопедия под редакцией Патриарха Московского и всея Руси Кирилла (электронная версия). (Orthodox Encyclopedia - Pravenc.ru).
- (in Russian) 5 ноября по старому стилю / 18 ноября по новому стилю. Русская Православная Церковь - Православный церковный календарь на 2015 год.
