= November 4 (Eastern Orthodox liturgics) =

Day in the Eastern Orthodox liturgical calendar

Eastern Orthodox liturgical calendar
November 3	November 4	November 5
November 4 O.S. ≍ November 17 N.S. November 4 N.S ≍ October 22 O.S.

An Eastern Orthodox cross

November 4 in Eastern Orthodox liturgical calendars is a feast day and a day of commemoration of saints and martyrs. Although some Orthodox churches use the Revised Julian Calendar and others use the traditional Julian calendar, the fixed commemorations for their respective November 4 are broadly the same, no matter which calendar is used. (Note: Despite the dates being the same, the days to which they refer typically differ by 13 days. The notation Old Style or O.S. is sometimes used to indicate a date in the traditional Julian Calendar (the "Old Calendar"). The notation New Style or N.S. indicates a date in the Revised Julian calendar (the "New Calendar").)

== Saints ==
- Saint Abimelech of Gerar the Righteous, who hosted Abraham, who had presented his wife Sarah as his sister (Genesis 20).
- Apostles Hermas, Patrobas, Linus, Gaius and Philologus, of the Seventy (1st century) (Note: Philologus and Patrobas - Orthodox in Rome greeted by the Apostle Paul in his letter to the Romans (16:14-18).) (Note: "The same day, the birthday of the Saints Philologus and Patrobas, disciples of the apostle St. Paul.") (see also: January 4, November 5)
- Hierymartyrs Nicander, Bishop of Myra, and Hermas, presbyter, both disciples of Titus (1st century)
- Martyr Porphyrius the Mime, of Caesarea (361) (see also: September 15)
- Saint Sylvia, mother of St. Gregory the Dialogist (6th century) (see also: November 3)
- Venerable Joannicius the Great of Bithynia (834)
- Venerable Gabriel of Atonelni

== Pre-Schism Western saints ==
- Saints Vitalis and Agricola, martyrs in Bologna in Italy, under Diocletian (c. 304) (Note: Vitalis suffered martyrdom with such courage that Agricola was inspired by him to face a shameful death - probably crucifixion - for Christ's sake. The basilica in Ravenna is dedicated to St. Vitalis.) (Note: "At Bologna, the holy martyrs Vitalis and Agricola. The former was first the servant of the latter, and afterwards his partner and colleague in martyrdom. He was subjected by the persecutors to all kinds of torments, so that there was no part of his body without wounds. After having suffered with constancy, he yielded up his soul to God in prayer. Agricola was put to death by being fastened to a cross with many nails. St. Ambrose relates that being present at their translation, he took the martyr's nails, his glorious blood, and the wood of his cross, and deposited them under the consecrated altars.")
- Saint Modesta, niece of Saint Modoald in France and first Abbess of Oehren in Trier in Germany (680)
- Saint Proculus, Bishop of Autun in France martyred by invading Huns (c. 717)
- Saint Clarus, a hermit near Rouen, murdered in the village of Saint-Clair-sur-Epte (c. 875) (Note: Born in Rochester in England, he went to France, where he lived as a hermit near Rouen. He was murdered in the village of Saint-Clair-sur-Epte where he lived and which is named after him. His relics are venerated there to this day.) (Note: "ST. CLARUS was an Englishman of high birth, who, in order to separate himself more completely from the world, left his own country, and settled in Neustria, or Normandy. It appears that he was then ordained priest, and by the sanctity of his life attracted many persons to his cell, to whom he would speak of the truths of salvation with great efficacy and benefit to their souls. Having fled to a forest to avoid the pursuits of a wicked and powerful woman, he was by her order tracked and murdered by two assassins, and so died a Martyr of chastity. St. Clarus was greatly venerated, not only in the province of Normandy, where his shrine was richly adorned, but also in the neighbourhood of Paris, whither his head has been translated.": The date of St. Clarus is variously placed in the seventh and in the ninth centuries, and there seem to be no means of determining which is the true one. It appears that there was another St. Clarus, a Martyr, in the diocese of Rouen, in the neighbourhood of Vexin. He is supposed to have lived in the third century, and is probably the one mentioned in the Roman Martyrology on this day.)
- Saint Birnstan of Winchester (Beornstan), Bishop of Winchester in England, who loved to pray for the departed (c. 934) (Note: "ST. BlRSTAN (also called BRISTAN and BRINSTAN) was consecrated by St. Frithestane, A.D. 932, the year before he died, to succeed him as Bishop of Winchester. He was a man of spotless holiness of life, and most remarkable for his charity towards the faithful departed and the suffering poor on earth. It was his custom daily to celebrate a Mass of Requiem for the holy souls, and at night to visit the cemeteries, and recite many psalms on their behalf. On one occasion, as he concluded these devotions with the words Requiescant in pace, he had the consolation of hearing the Amen in response, uttered by a host of voices, as of the dead speaking from their graves. It was also his practice each day to assemble a number of poor persons, to wash their feet, and to serve them at table, without assistance and without witnesses. When this charitable office was ended, he would retire to his chamber, and pass hours in solitary prayer. One day he did not reappear at the usual hour; but it caused little surprise, as his prolonged devotions were well known to his household; but on the next morning his attendants forced open the door, and found that the Saint had tranquilly expired, without any previous illness. He was buried in his church, without any signs of unusual reverence on the part of the people, in whom this sudden death seemed to have cancelled the impression they had of his sanctity. Many years after this event, as St. Ethelwold, then Bishop of Winchester, was praying before the relics of the Saints, St. Birstan appeared to him, in company with St. Birinus and St. Swithin, and told him that, as he enjoyed equal glory with them in heaven, it was the will of God that he should receive equal honour on earth. His translation was accordingly celebrated with great triumph, and thus reparation was made for the neglect with which he had been treated for some time.")
- Saint Gregory of Burtscheid, a Greek monk from Cerchiara in Calabria in Italy, founder of Burtscheid Abbey (999) (Note: He fled from the Saracens and met Emperor Otto III in Rome. The latter befriended him, invited him to Germany and built for him the monastery of Burtscheid near Aachen.) (see also: November 5)
- Saint Emeric of Hungary, son of Saint Stephen, the first Christian King of Hungary, he was a disciple of Saint Gerard Sagredo of Czanad, Confessor (1031)

== Post-Schism Orthodox saints ==
- Saint Luke, Bishop of Novgorod (1059)
- Holy and Righteous Ioane, Stepane, and Isaiah the Georgians. (Note: It is believed that Holy John, Steven, and Isaiah lived in Jerusalem and guarded the Tomb of our Lord. It is probable that the Georgian Orthodox Church proclaimed them deserving of exceptional honor in recognition of their dedicated service at the Tomb of the Savior. For several centuries the Georgian Church has glorified the Righteous John, Steven, and Isaiah and asked for their intercessions before the Lord.)
- Saint John III Doukas Vatatzes the Merciful, Emperor of Nicaea (1254)
- Venerable Mercurius the Faster of the Far Caves in Kiev (14th century) (see also: November 24)
- Blessed Simon of Yurievets and Zharki, Fool-for-Christ (1584) (Note: See: (in Russian) Симон Блаженный. Википедии. (Russian Wikipedia).)
- Saint Nicander, founder of Gorodnoezersk Monastery, Novgorod (1603)
- Saint Paul (Konyuskevych), Metropolitan of Tobolsk and Siberia (1768) (Note: See: (in Russian) Павел (Конюскевич). Википедии. (Russian Wikipedia).)
- Venerable George (Karslidis) of Drama the Confessor (1959) (see also: October 24 / November 6 - Russian)

=== New martyrs and confessors ===
- New Hieromartyr Nicholas Vinogradov, Confessor and Priest (1931)
- New Virgin Martyr Eugenia Lysova, Nun (1935)
- New Hieromartyr Seraphim Samoilovich, Archbishop of Uglich (1937)
- New Hieromartyr Alexander Petropavlovsky, Priest (1937)
- New Hieromartyr Ismael Bazilevsky, Priest (1941) (Note: See: (in Russian) Исмаил (Базилевский). Википедии. (Russian Wikipedia).)

== Other commemorations ==
- Narration of the destruction of Jerusalem (587 BC) in the Lamentations of Jeremiah the Prophet, and on the ecstasy of Abimelech (≍ Ebedmelech the Ethiopian, of Jeremiah 38:7). (Note: Saint Nicodemus the Hagiorite writes about this event.)
- Repose of Schemamonk Mark of Sarov Monastery (1817)
- Repose of Hieroschemamonk Daniel (Sandu Tudor), poet of Romania (1962) (see also: November 17 - N.S.)

== Icon gallery ==
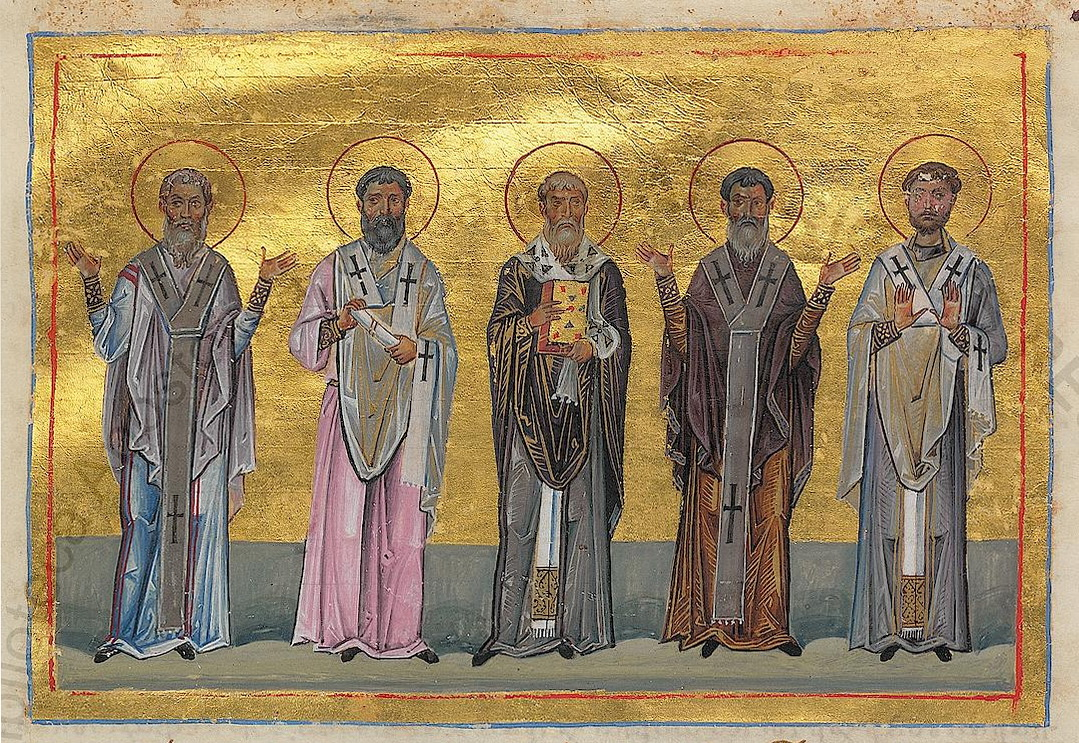
Apostles Hermas, Patrobas, Linus, Gaius and Philologus, of the Seventy.
(Menologion of Basil II, 10th century).

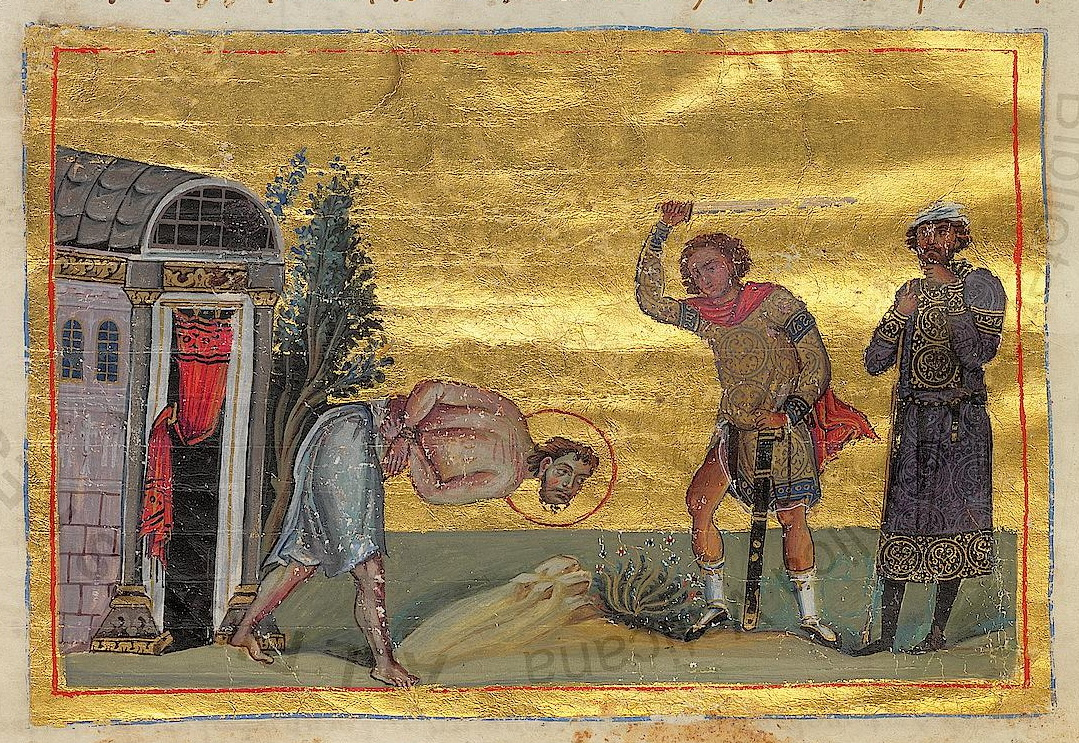
Martyr Porphyrius the Mime, of Caesarea.
(Menologion of Basil II, 10th century).

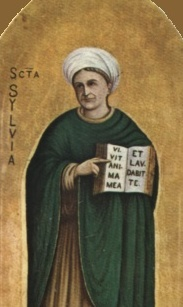
St. Sylvia, mother of St. Gregory the Dialogist.

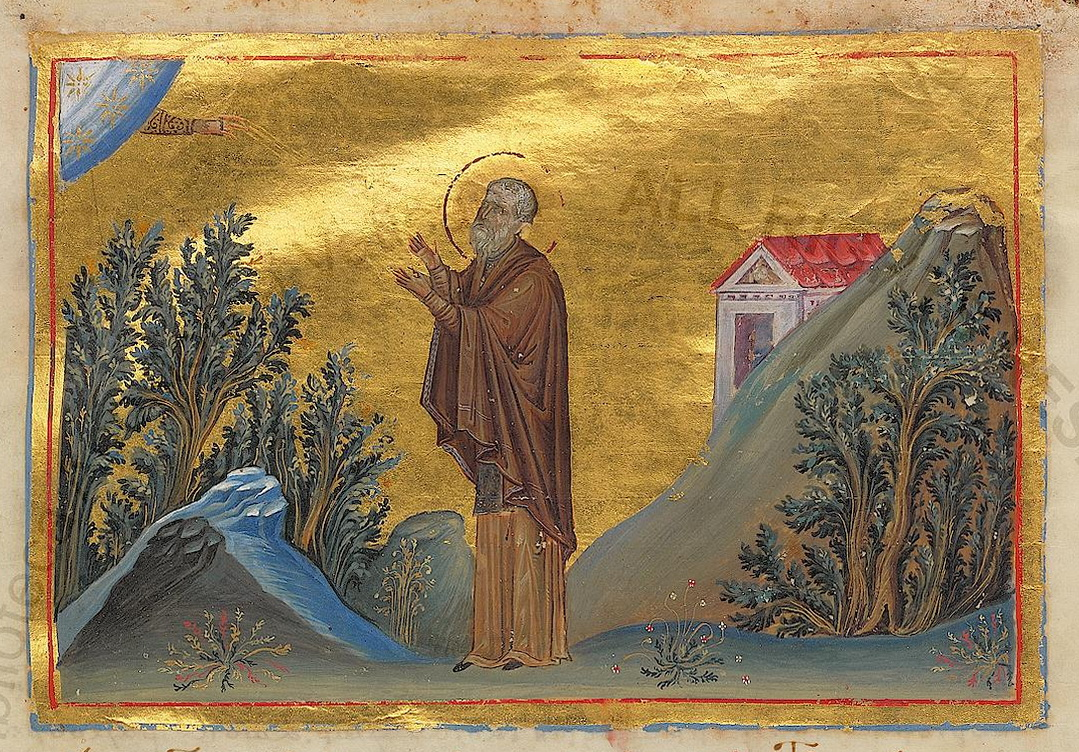
Venerable Joannicius the Great of Bithynia.
(Menologion of Basil II, 10th century).

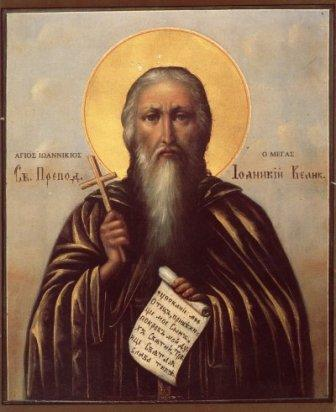
Venerable Joannicius the Great of Bithynia.

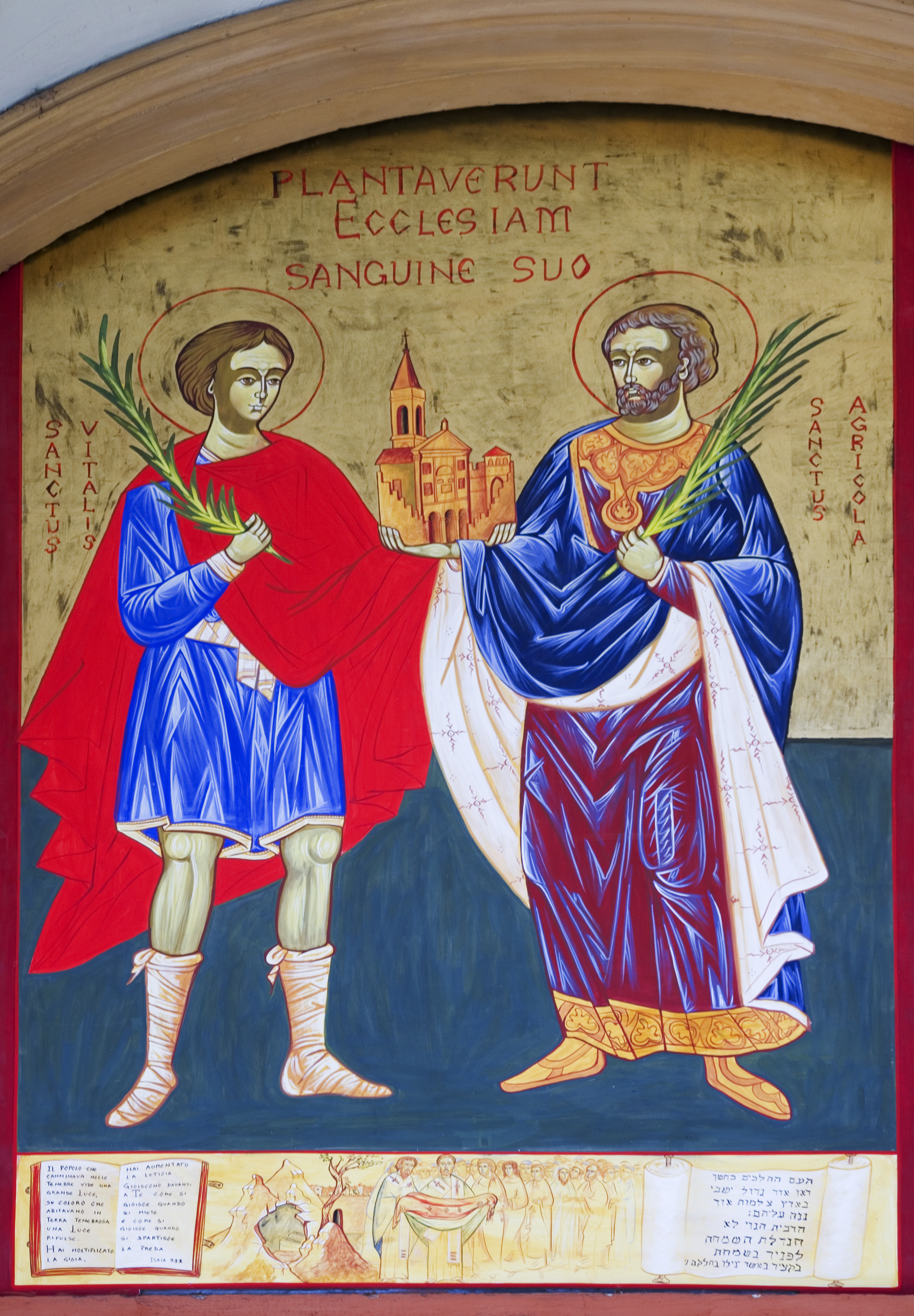
Sts. Vitalis and Agricola.

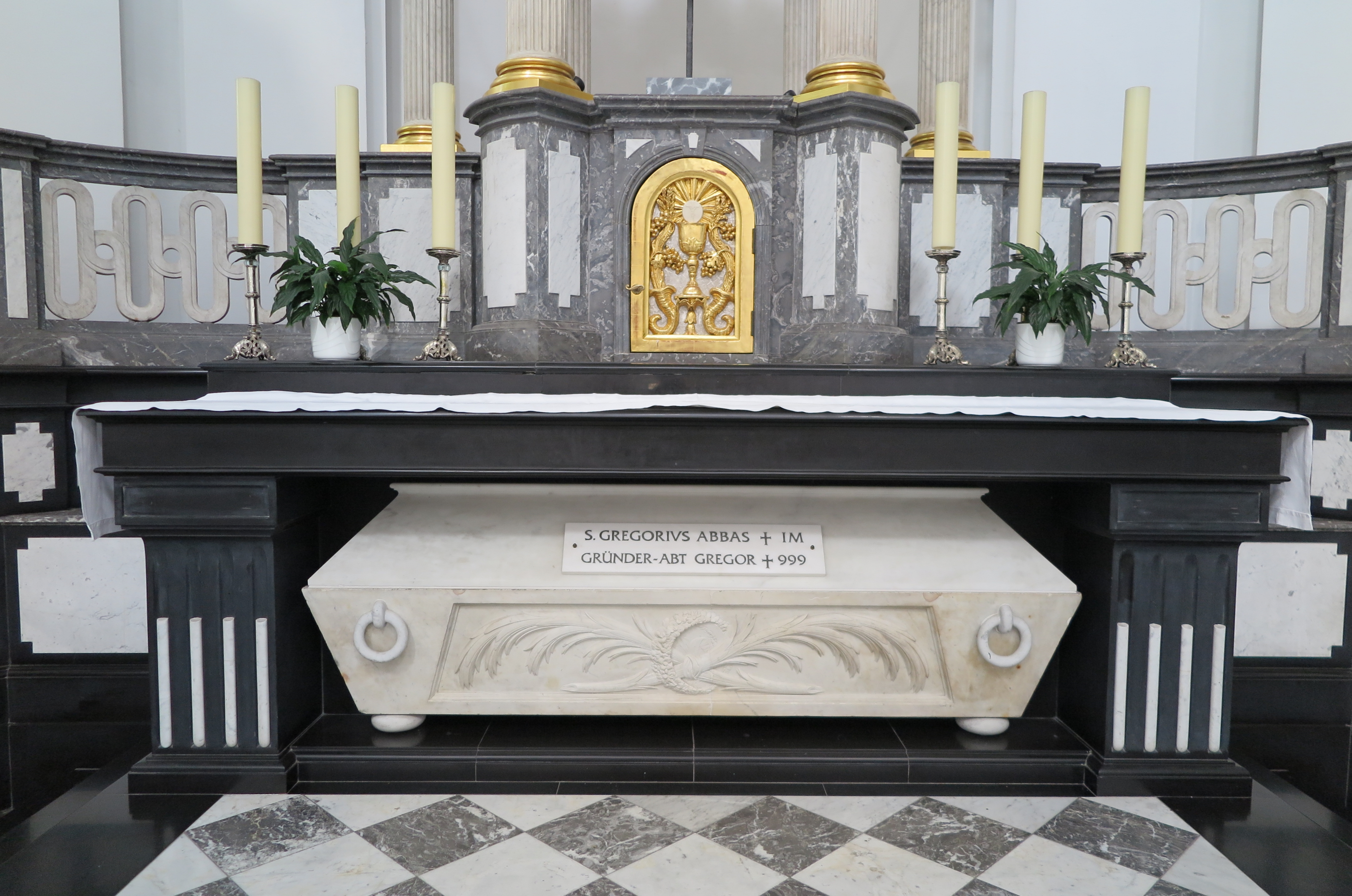
Reliquary of St. Gregory of Burtscheid, in Aachen-Burtscheid.

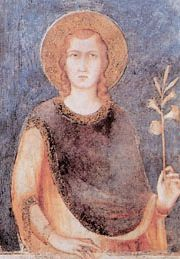
St. Emeric of Hungary.

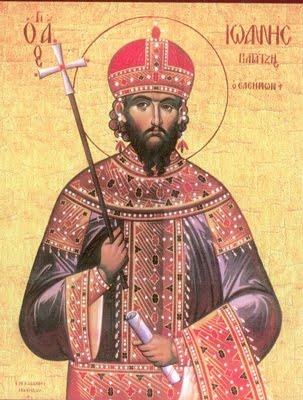
St. John Vatatzes the Merciful King, Emperor of Nicaea and "the Father of the Greeks."

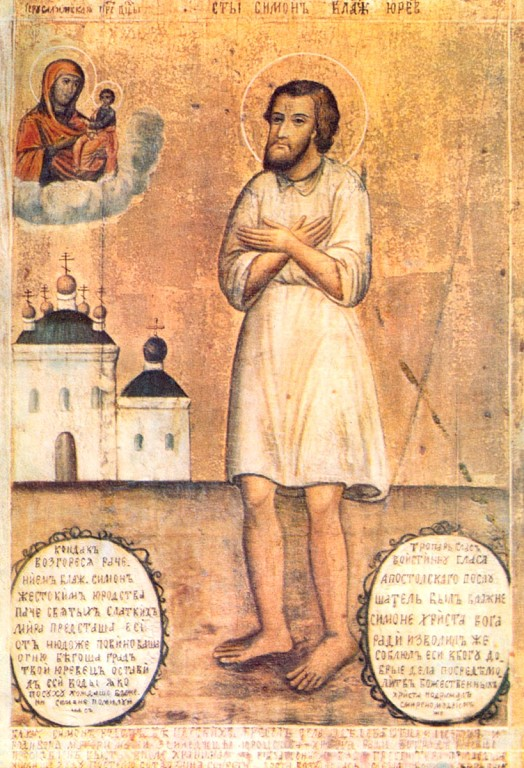
Blessed Simon of Yurievets and Zharki, Fool-for-Christ.

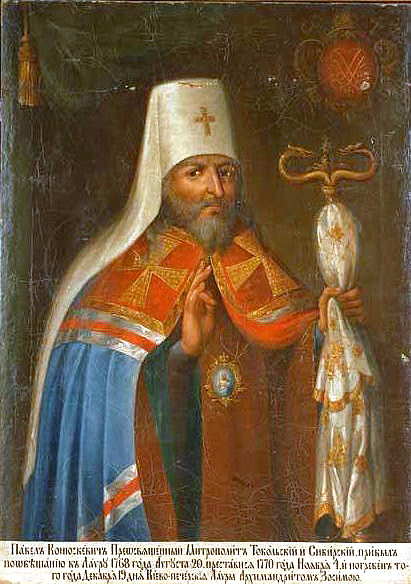
St. Paul (Konyuskevych), Metropolitan of Tobolsk and Siberia.

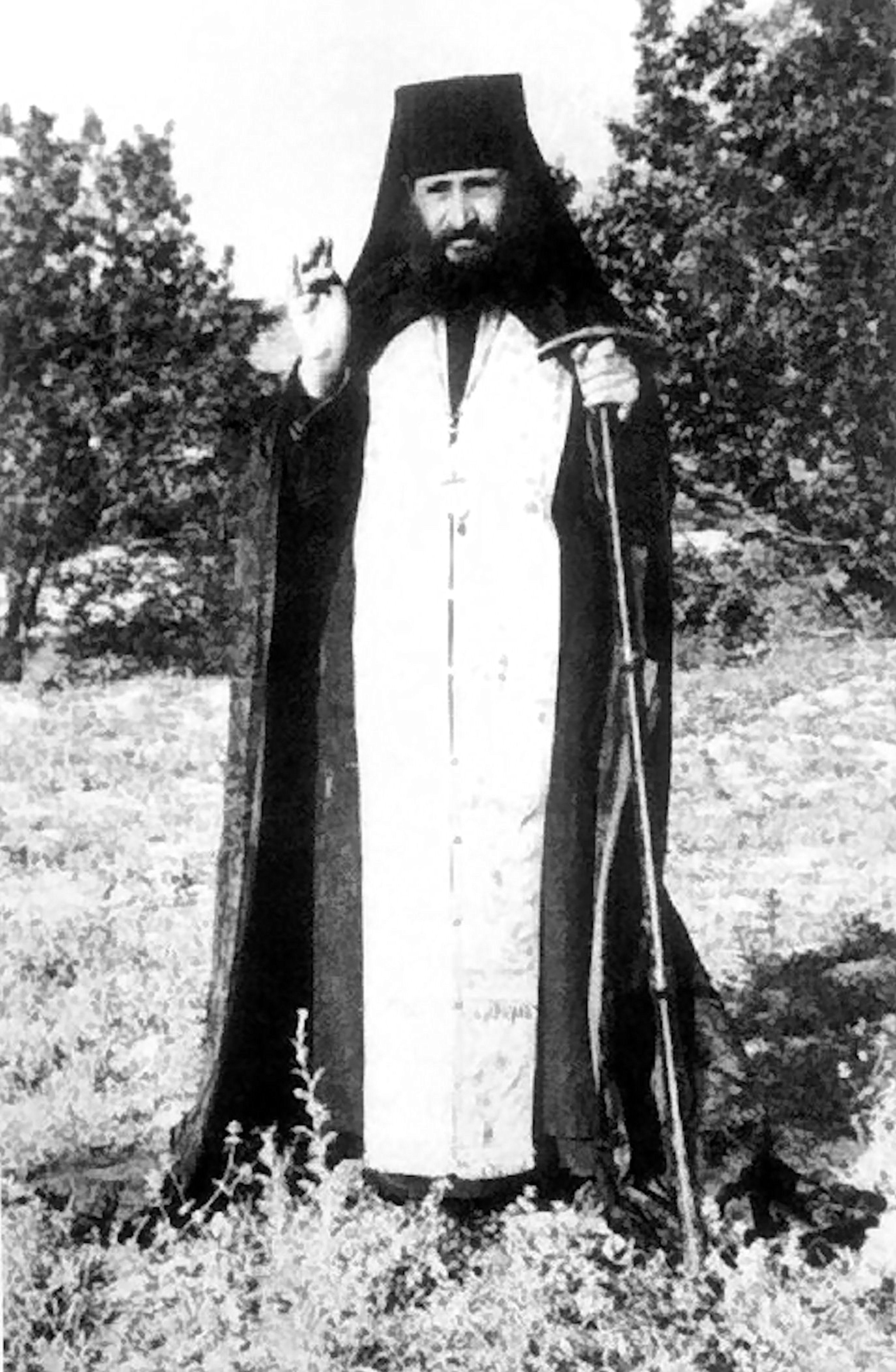
Venerable George (Karslidis) of Drama.

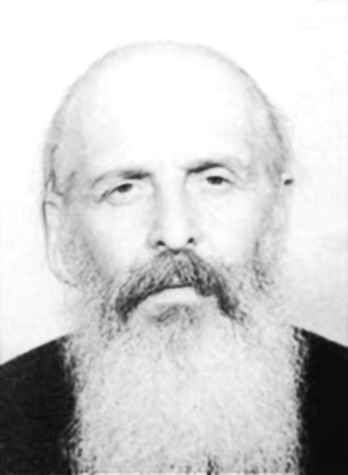
Sandu Tudor (Brother Agathon, Father Daniil Teodorescu).

== Sources ==
- November 4/November 17. Orthodox Calendar (PRAVOSLAVIE.RU).
- November 17 / November 4. HOLY TRINITY RUSSIAN ORTHODOX CHURCH (A parish of the Patriarchate of Moscow).
- November 4. OCA - The Lives of the Saints.
- The Autonomous Orthodox Metropolia of Western Europe and the Americas (ROCOR). St. Hilarion Calendar of Saints for the year of our Lord 2004. St. Hilarion Press (Austin, TX). pp. 82–83.
- The Fourth Day of the Month of November. Orthodoxy in China.
- November 4. Latin Saints of the Orthodox Patriarchate of Rome.
- The Roman Martyrology. Transl. by the Archbishop of Baltimore. Last Edition, According to the Copy Printed at Rome in 1914. Revised Edition, with the Imprimatur of His Eminence Cardinal Gibbons. Baltimore: John Murphy Company, 1916. pp. 340–341.
- Rev. Richard Stanton. A Menology of England and Wales, or, Brief Memorials of the Ancient British and English Saints Arranged According to the Calendar, Together with the Martyrs of the 16th and 17th Centuries. London: Burns & Oates, 1892. pp. 524–526.

Greek Sources

- Great Synaxaristes: (in Greek) 4 ΝΟΕΜΒΡΙΟΥ. ΜΕΓΑΣ ΣΥΝΑΞΑΡΙΣΤΗΣ.
- (in Greek) Συναξαριστής. 4 Νοεμβρίου. ECCLESIA.GR. (H ΕΚΚΛΗΣΙΑ ΤΗΣ ΕΛΛΑΔΟΣ).
- (in Greek) November 4. Ορθόδοξος Συναξαριστής.

Russian Sources

- (in Russian) 17 ноября (4 ноября). Православная Энциклопедия под редакцией Патриарха Московского и всея Руси Кирилла (электронная версия). (Orthodox Encyclopedia - Pravenc.ru).
- (in Russian) 4 ноября по старому стилю / 17 ноября по новому стилю. Русская Православная Церковь - Православный церковный календарь на 2015 год.
