= Hermas of Philippopolis =

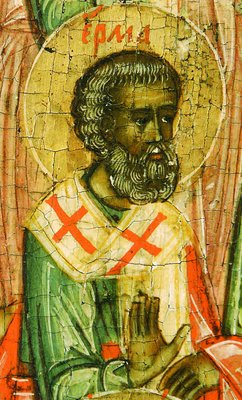

Saint Hermas of Philippopolis (Greek: Έρμάς ό Φιλιππουπολίτης) was one of the Seventy Disciples and was bishop in Philippopolis in Thrace (today's Plovdiv, Bulgaria). Hermas, the author of The Shepherd of Hermas, was often identified with him, but that Hermas was a second-generation Christian and lived some time after this Hermas.

He is mentioned in Romans 16:14, and his feast day is celebrated on May 31, on November 5 with Apostles Patrobas, Linus, Gaius, and Philologus, and on January 4 among the Seventy.

== Life ==
He was wealthy, but fell into poverty because of sin and the sins of his sons.

He was said to have been visited by an angel of repentance, who stayed with him until the end of his life.

He ended his life as a martyr.

== Sources ==
- St. Nikolai Velimirovic, The Prologue from Ohrid
