= November 17 (Eastern Orthodox liturgics) =

Day in the Eastern Orthodox liturgical calendar

Eastern Orthodox liturgical calendar
November 16	November 17	November 18
November 17 O.S. ≍ November 30 N.S. November 17 N.S ≍ November 4 O.S.

An Eastern Orthodox cross

November 17 in Eastern Orthodox liturgical calendars is a feast day and a day of commemoration of saints and martyrs. Although some Orthodox churches use the Revised Julian Calendar and others use the traditional Julian calendar, the fixed commemorations for their respective November 17 are broadly the same, no matter which calendar is used. (Note: Despite the dates being the same, the days to which they refer typically differ by 13 days. The notation Old Style or O.S. is sometimes used to indicate a date in the traditional Julian Calendar (the "Old Calendar"). The notation New Style or N.S. indicates a date in the Revised Julian calendar (the "New Calendar").)

== Saints ==
- Saint Gregory the Wonderworker of Neo-Caesarea (266) (Note: "AT Neocaesarea, in Pontus, the birthday of St. Gregory, bishop, illustrious by his learning and sanctity. The prodigies and miracles which he wrought to the great glory of the Church gained for him the surname of Wonder-worker.")
- Hieromartyr Basil, Bishop of Hamah (282)
- Martyrs Zachariah (Zacharias) the Cobbler and his wife, Mary (3rd century)
- Martyrs Gregory, Victor, and Geminus of Heracleon in Thrace (304)
- 150 philosophers converted by St. Catherine, and who suffered in Alexandria (305)
- Venerable Longinus of Egypt (4th century)
- Martyr Sak (Saktus, Sanctus) the Persian. (Note: He is not listed in the Synaxaria, but is found in Parisian Codex 1578. He may be one and the same as the Martyr Saktus / Sanctus (July 25).)
- Saint Maximus (Maximian), Archbishop of Constantinople (434) (see also: April 21)
- Saint Gennadius I, Patriarch of Constantinople (471)
- Saint John the Cobbler of Olumba, Cairo, and Sinai (7th century)
- Venerable Lazarus the iconographer of Constantinople (857)
- Great-Martyr Gobron (Michael) and 133 soldiers of Georgia (914)
- Venerable John of Olympus (John Dermokaitis), in Bithynia (c. 919–944) (Note: His memory is preserved in the Synaxarion of Delahaye, noting that he was an ascetic on Mt. Olympos in Bithynia. He may be the same individual as John the Monk, who was known for the sanctity of his life, under Emperor Romanos I Lekapenos (919–944). Emperor Romanos, after his death, sent a sealed epistle to this John the Monk, containing a confession of his sins.)
- Venerable Justin

== Pre-Schism Western saints ==
- Martyrs Acisclus and Victoria, at Córdoba in Hispania (304) (Note: "At Cordova, during the same persecution, the holy martyrs Acisclus, and Victoria, his sister, who were most cruelly tortured by order of the governor Dion, and thus merited to be crowned by our Lord for their glorious sufferings.") (Note: Brother and sister, they were born in Cordoba in Spain and were martyred, probably under Diocletian. Their home was turned into a church. They are the main patron-saints of Cordoba and were venerated throughout Spain and the south of France.)
- Saint Eugene, a deacon of the Church of Florence with Bishop Zenobius (422) (Note: "At Florence, St. Eugenius, confessor, deacon of blessed Zenobius, bishop of that city." He had been a disciple of St. Ambrose at Milan.)
- Saint Anianus of Orleans (Aignan), fifth Bishop of Orleans in France (453) (Note: He is famous for organising the defence of his city during the invasion of the Huns under Attila. He interceded with the latter on his approach to Orleans, thus saving it.) (Note: "At Orleans, St. Anian, bishop, whose precious death in the sight of the Lord is attested by frequent miracles.")
- Saint Gregory of Tours, Bishop of Tours (594), and with him Venerable Aredius, Abbot of Limoges and Venerable Vulfolaic, stylite of Trier, Gaul. (Note: Born in Auvergne in France, he was baptised George Florentius, but took the name Gregory when he became Bishop of Tours in 573. He was a fine bishop and excelled as a historian.)
- Saint Namasius (Naamat, Namat, Namatius), twenty-second Bishop of Vienne in France (c. 599)
- Venerable Hilda, Abbess of Whitby Abbey (680) (Note: Born in Northumbria, she was a relative of King Edwin. Baptised as a child by St. Paulinus in 631, at the age of thirty-three she joined the nuns of Hartlepool in Northumberland where soon after she became abbess. Later she became Abbess of Whitby. Her influence was one of the most decisive factors in uniting the Church in seventh century England. Five of her monks became bishops.)

== Post-Schism Orthodox saints ==
- Venerable Gennadius, Abbot of Vatopedi, Mount Athos (14th century)
- Venerable Nikon, Abbot of Radonezh, disciple of St. Sergius of Radonezh (1426) (Note: See: (in Russian) Никон Радонежский. Википедии. (Russian Wikipedia).)
- Saint Maximus III, Ecumenical Patriarch of Constantinople (1482)
- Venerable Archimandrite Sevastijan Dabović (Sebastian Dabovich) of San Francisco and Jackson, Enlightener and Apostle of the Church in America (1940) (Note: Canonized in 2015.) (see also: November 30 - N.S.)

== Other commemorations ==
- Translation of the relics (1935) of St. Gregory, Bishop of Assos near Ephesus (1150), to Lesvos. (Note: His feast day is on March 4. The Translation of his Relics to Lesvos took place on November 16, 1935. Based on the proposal of the Metropolitan of Mytilene, the Ecumenical Patriarchate appointed the feast day for the 'Translation of the relics of Saint Gregory, Bishop of Assos (1150), to be celebrated each year on the 1st Sunday after November 10.) (On the Sunday between November 11–17 each year.)
- Repose of Hieroschemamonk Daniel (Sandu Tudor), poet of Romania (1962) (see also: November 4 - O.S.)

== Icon gallery ==
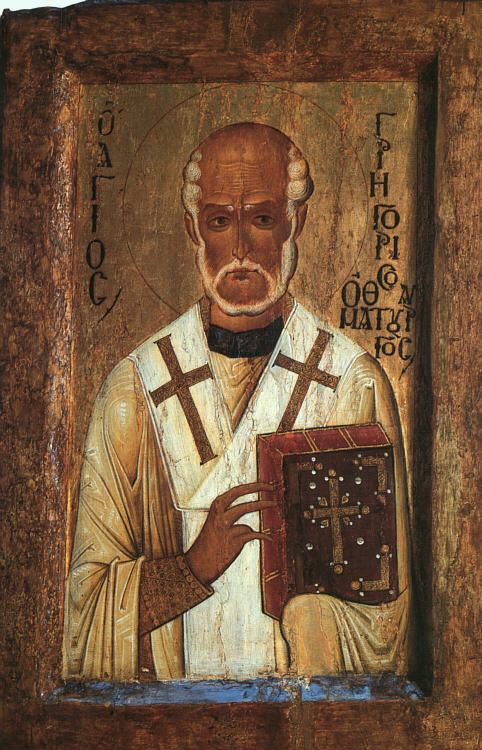
St. Gregory the Wonderworker of Neo-Caesarea.

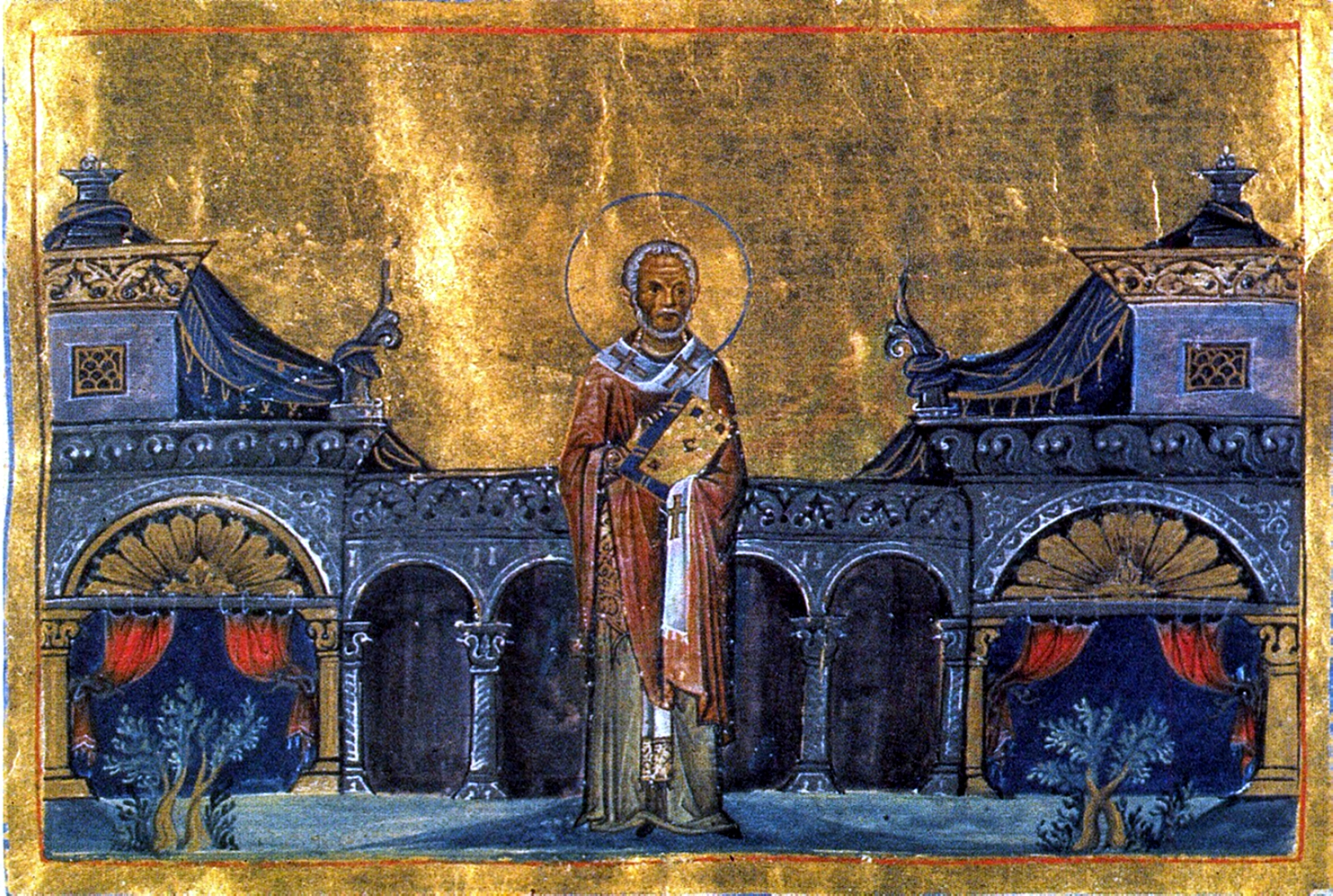
St. Gregory the Wonderworker of Neo-Caesarea.
(Menologion of Basil II, 10th century).

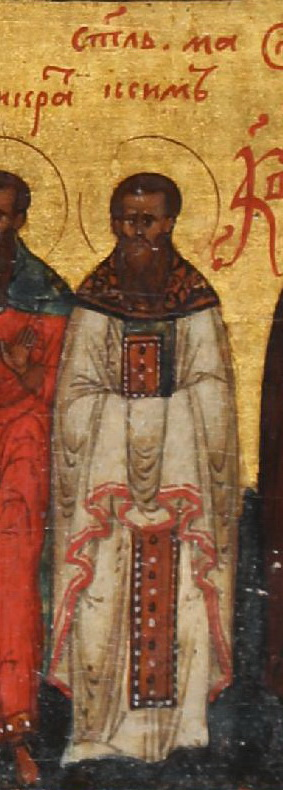
St. Maximianus.

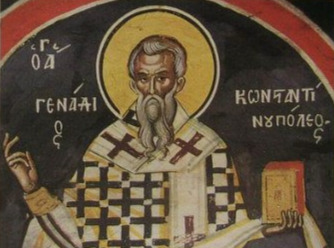
St. Gennadius I, Patriarch of Constantinople.
(Dionysiou Monastery).

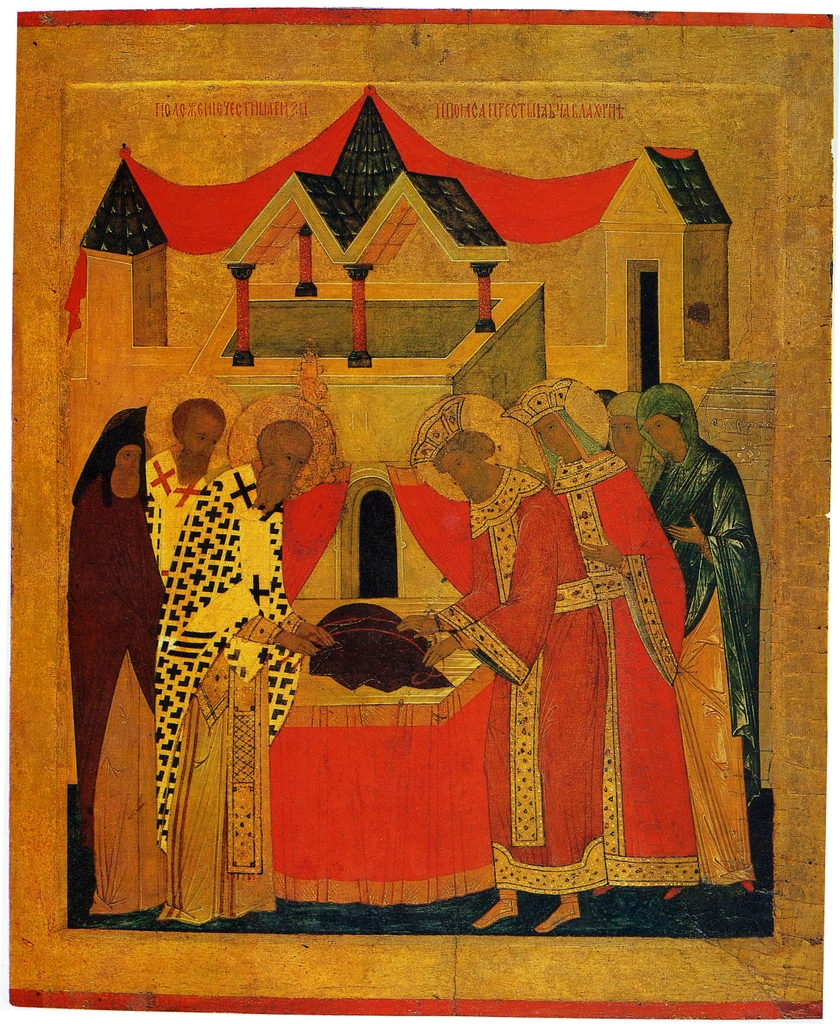
Deposition of the Robe of Virgin Mary by Gennadius and Emperor Leon.

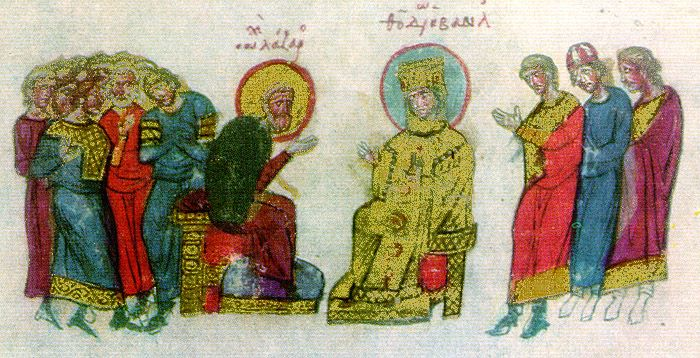
Empress Theodora and monk Lazarus the iconographer.

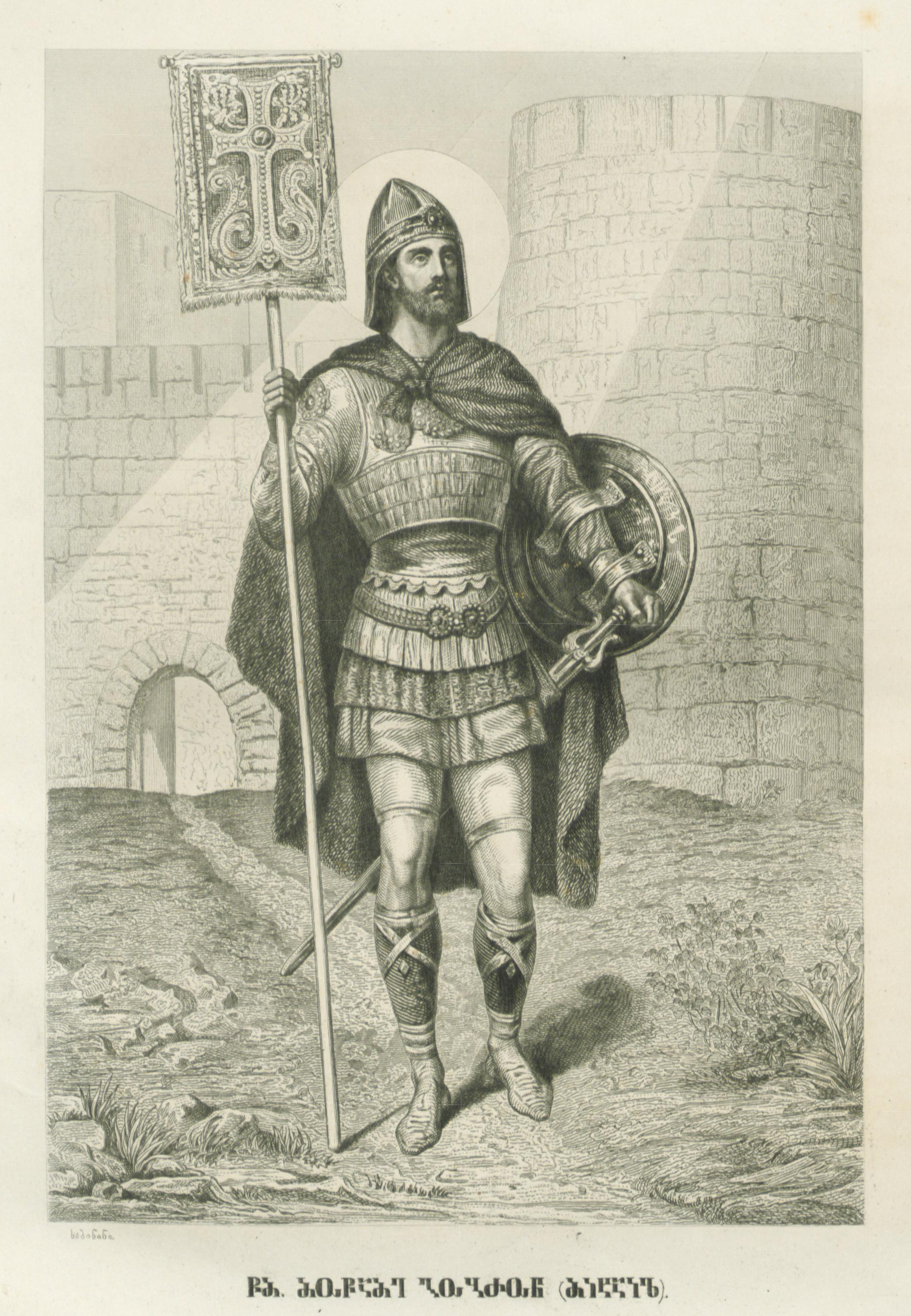
Great-Martyr Gobron (Michael) of Georgia.

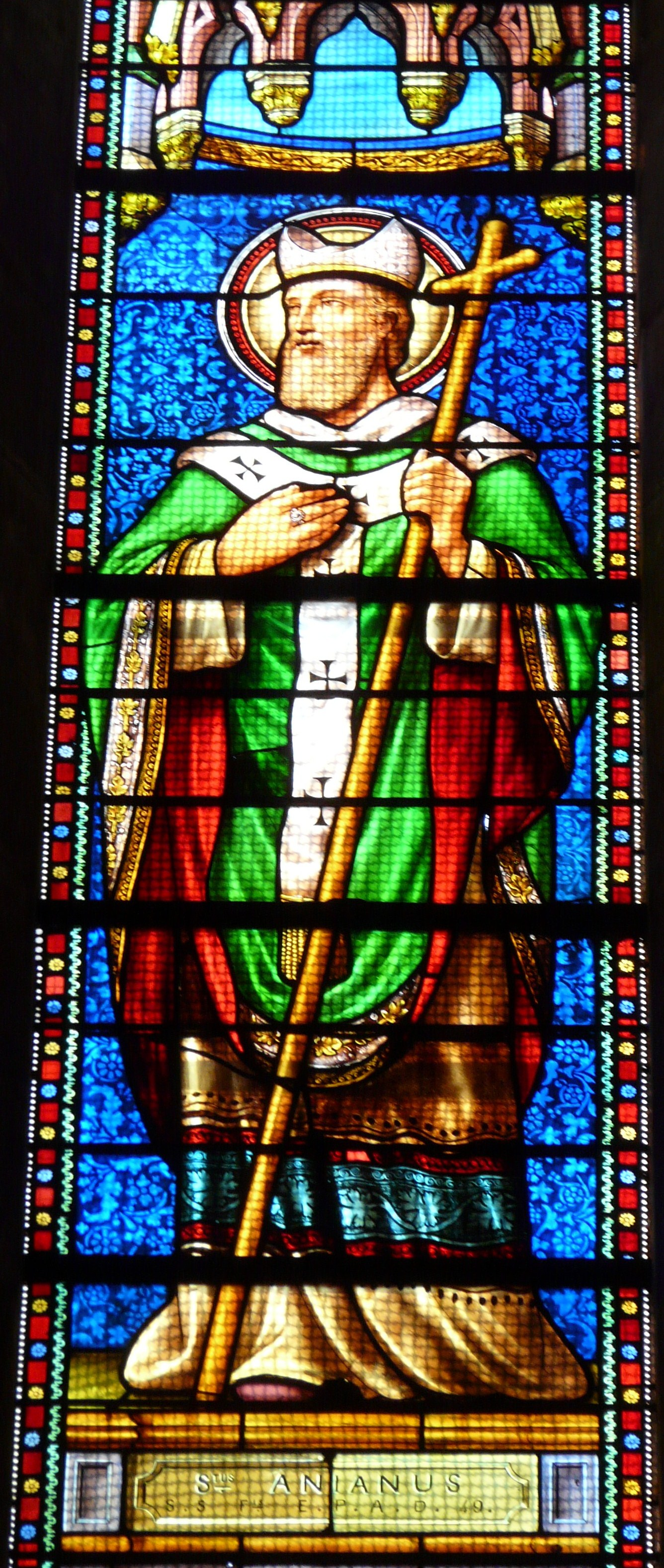
St. Anianus of Orleans.

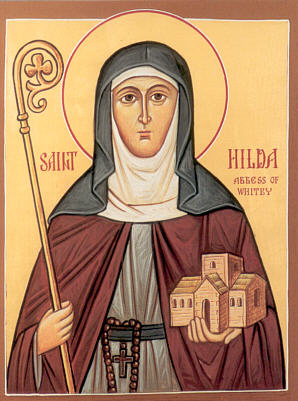
Venerable Hilda, Abbess of Whitby.

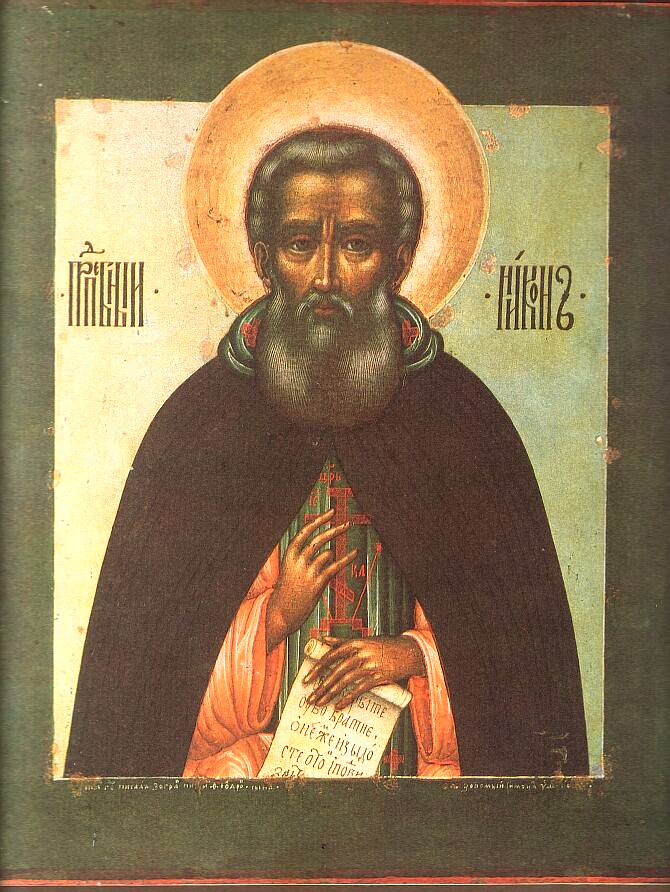
Venerable Nikon, Abbot of Radonezh.

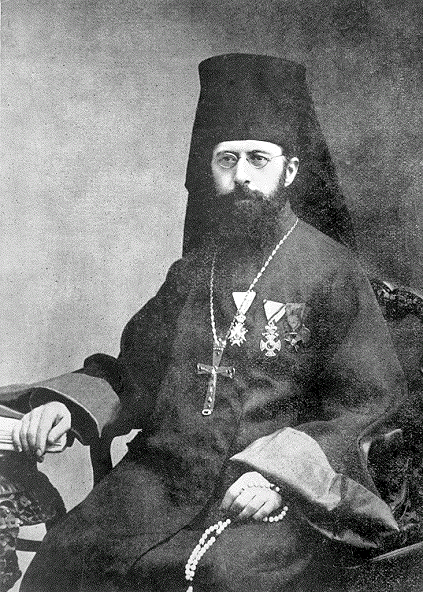
Venerable Archimandrite Sebastian (Dabovich) of San Francisco and Jackson.

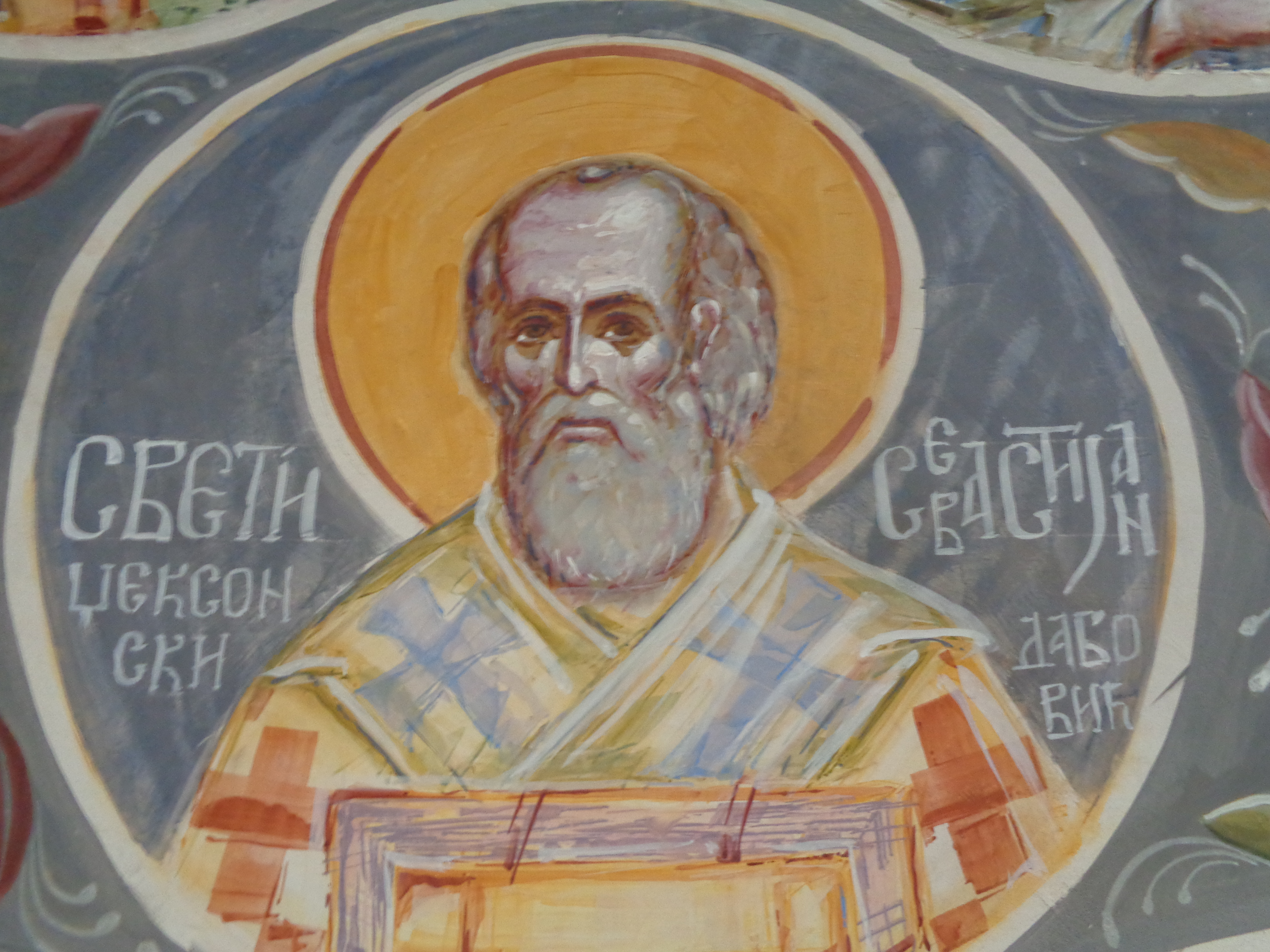
Venerable Archimandrite Sebastian (Dabovich) of San Francisco and Jackson.

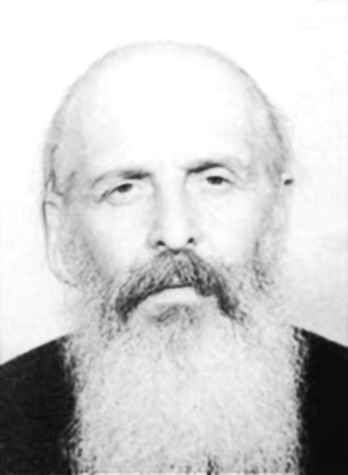
Sandu Tudor (Brother Agathon, Father Daniil Teodorescu).

== Sources ==
- November 17 / December 30. Orthodox Calendar (PRAVOSLAVIE.RU).
- November 30 / November 17. Holy Trinity Russian Orthodox Church (A parish of the Patriarchate of Moscow).
- November 17. OCA - The Lives of the Saints.
- The Autonomous Orthodox Metropolia of Western Europe and the Americas (ROCOR). St. Hilarion Calendar of Saints for the year of our Lord 2004. St. Hilarion Press (Austin, TX). p. 86.
- The Seventeenth Day of the Month of November. Orthodoxy in China.
- November 17. Latin Saints of the Orthodox Patriarchate of Rome.
- The Roman Martyrology. Transl. by the Archbishop of Baltimore. Last Edition, According to the Copy Printed at Rome in 1914. Revised Edition, with the Imprimatur of His Eminence Cardinal Gibbons. Baltimore: John Murphy Company, 1916. pp. 354–355.
- Rev. Richard Stanton. A Menology of England and Wales, or, Brief Memorials of the Ancient British and English Saints Arranged According to the Calendar, Together with the Martyrs of the 16th and 17th Centuries. London: Burns & Oates, 1892. pp. 551–554.

Greek Sources

- Great Synaxaristes: (in Greek) 17 ΝΟΕΜΒΡΙΟΥ. ΜΕΓΑΣ ΣΥΝΑΞΑΡΙΣΤΗΣ.
- (in Greek) Συναξαριστής. 17 Νοεμβρίου. ECCLESIA.GR. (H ΕΚΚΛΗΣΙΑ ΤΗΣ ΕΛΛΑΔΟΣ).
- (in Greek) November 17. Ορθόδοξος Συναξαριστής.

Russian Sources

- (in Russian) 30 ноября (17 ноября). Православная Энциклопедия под редакцией Патриарха Московского и всея Руси Кирилла (электронная версия). (Orthodox Encyclopedia - Pravenc.ru).
- (in Russian) 17 ноября по старому стилю / 30 ноября по новому стилю. Русская Православная Церковь - Православный церковный календарь на 2018 год.
