= Galaction =

Galaction may refer to:

- Alternative spelling of Galaktion
- Galaction and Episteme, 3rd-century martyrs
- Galaction Cordun, Metropolitan (1955–1956) of the Old Calendar Orthodox Church of Romania
- Gala Galaction (1879-1961), Romanian Orthodox clergyman, theologian, writer, journalist, left-wing activist
- Galaction Stângă (born 1953), Romanian Bishop of Diocese of Alexandria and Teleorman
