= Galaktion =

Galaktion is a masculine given name. Notable people with the name include:

- Galaktion, an alternative name of Syrian Christian martyr Galaction, see Galaction and Episteme
- Galaktion Alpaidze (1916–2006), Soviet lieutenant general
- Galaktion Tabidze (1892–1959), Georgian poet

== See also ==
- Galaction
