= Victricius =

Saint Victricius
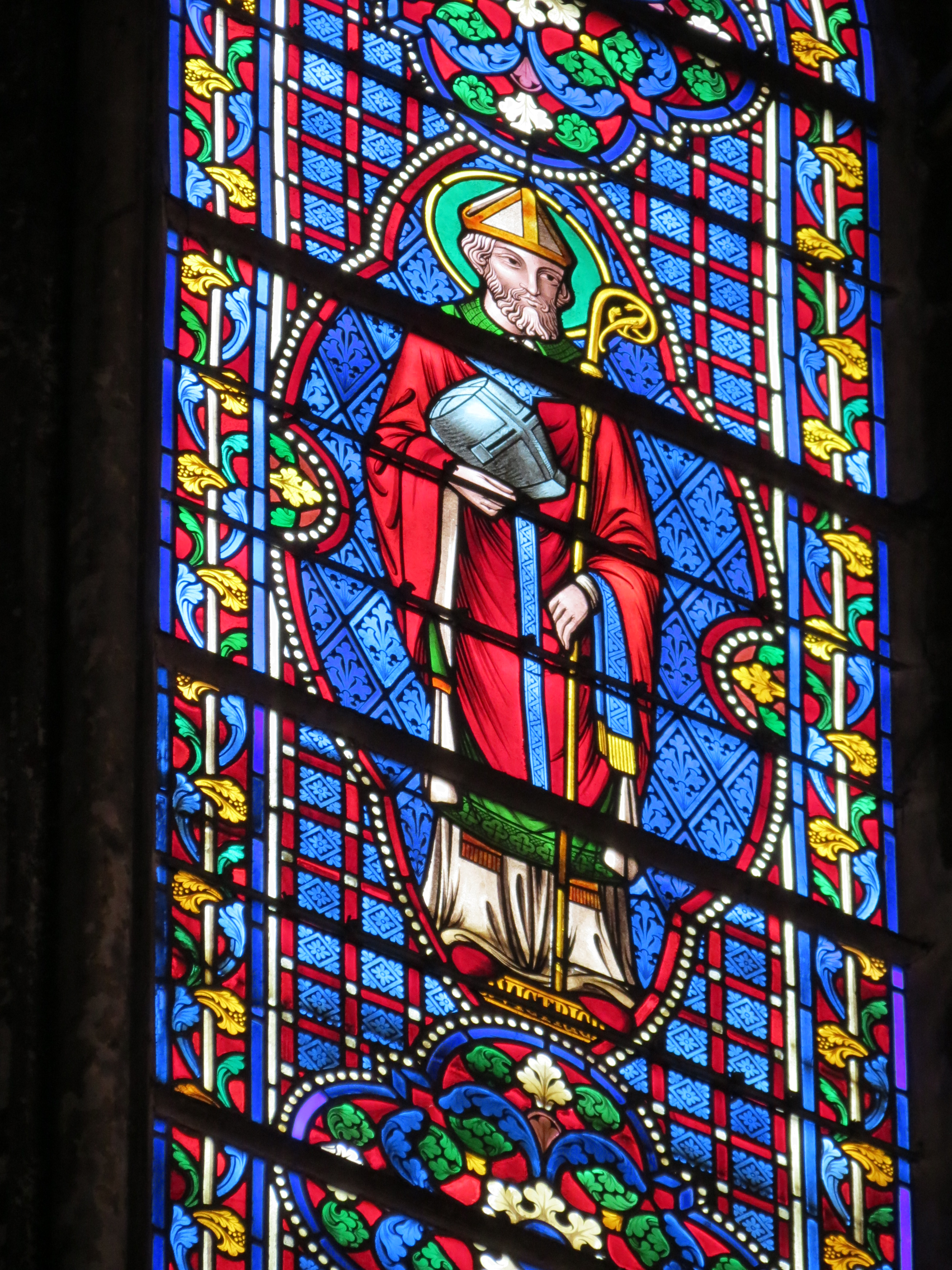

Bishop
- Born: ~330 AD
- Died: ~407 AD
- Venerated in: Roman Catholic Church; Eastern Orthodox Church
- Canonized: pre-congregation
- Feast: August 7

Victricius (French: Victrice; Italian: Vittricio) also known as Victricius of Rouen (c. 330 – c. 407 AD) was a bishop of Rouen (393–407), missionary, and author. His feast day is August 7.

== Life ==
Victricius was Gallic by birth, the son of a Roman legionnaire. He also became a soldier and was posted to various locations around Gaul. However, when he became a Christian, he refused to remain in the army. He was flogged and sentenced to death, but managed to avoid execution. He proselytized amongst the tribes of Flanders, Hainault, and Brabant. He became bishop of Rouen around 386 or 393.

He was accused of heresy but was defended by Pope Innocent I and received from Innocent the important decretal of the Liber Regularum.

== De Laude Sanctorum ==
In 396, Ambrose of Milan sent Victricius (as well as Paulinus of Nola and others) some relics of Vitalis and Agricola. Victricius wrote a sermon, De Laude Sanctorum (On the Praise of the Saints), celebrating the arrival of the relics from Italy. He mentions that he had been away from Rouen (396), as he had been requested to travel to Britain to help resolve some doctrinal issues. Victricius describes Britain as a wild and hostile place dealing with paganism and heresy in contrast with Italy with its abundance of holy sites and relics of martyrs.

Victricius welcomes the arriving relics and names the (relics of) saints who are already present in Rouen: John the Baptist, Andrew, Thomas, Gervasius and Protasius, Agricola, and Euphemia.

== Bibliography ==
- Gillian Clark, "Victricius of Rouen: Praising the Saints (Introduction and annotated translation)," Journal of Early Christian Studies, 7 (1999), 365–399; = in Eadem, Body and Gender, Soul and Reason in Late Antiquity (Farnham; Burlington, VT, Ashgate, 2011) (Variorum collected studies series, CS978), art. XII.
- Gillian Clark, "Translating relics: Victricius of Rouen and fourth-century debate," Early Medieval Europe, 10 (2001), 161–176; in Eadem, Body and Gender, Soul and Reason in Late Antiquity (Farnham; Burlington, VT, Ashgate, 2011) (Variorum collected studies series, CS978), art. XIII.
