= Saints Vitalis and Agricola =

Roman Catholic saints

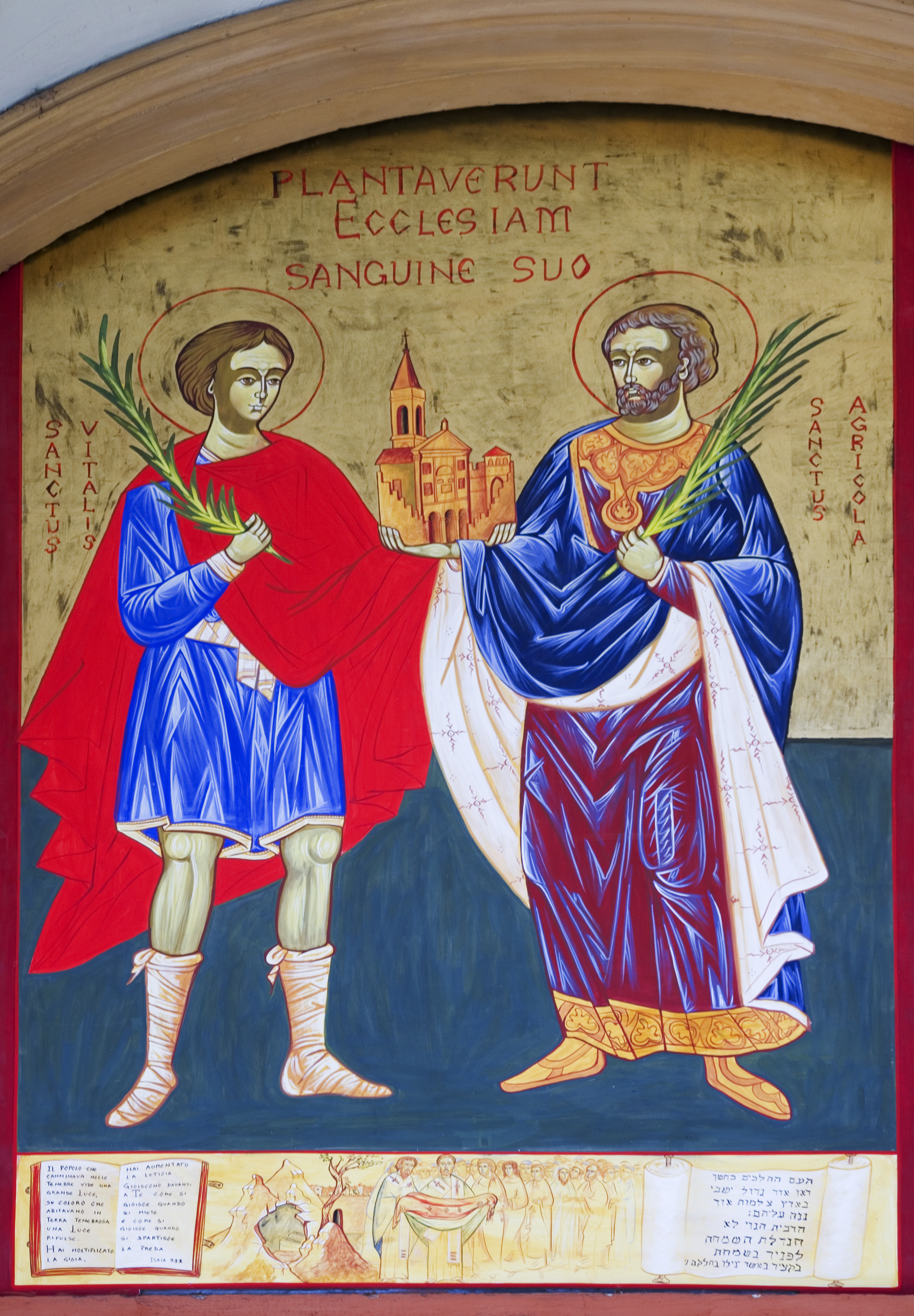
- The painting of Christian martyrs Vitalis and Agricola in Bologna.

Protomartyrs of Bologna
- Died: ~304 AD; Bologna
- Venerated in: Catholic Church. Eastern Orthodoxy
- Feast: 4 November

Vitalis and Agricola (Italian: Vitale e Agricola) are venerated as martyrs and saints, who are considered to have died at Bologna about 304, during the persecution ordered by Roman Emperor Diocletian.

== Legend ==
Agricola was a Christian citizen of Bologna who converted his slave, Vitalis, to Christianity; they became deeply attached to each other. Vitalis was first to suffer martyrdom, being executed in the amphitheatre. The authorities then tortured Agricola, but failed to make him give up his religion. He was finally crucified.

== Veneration ==
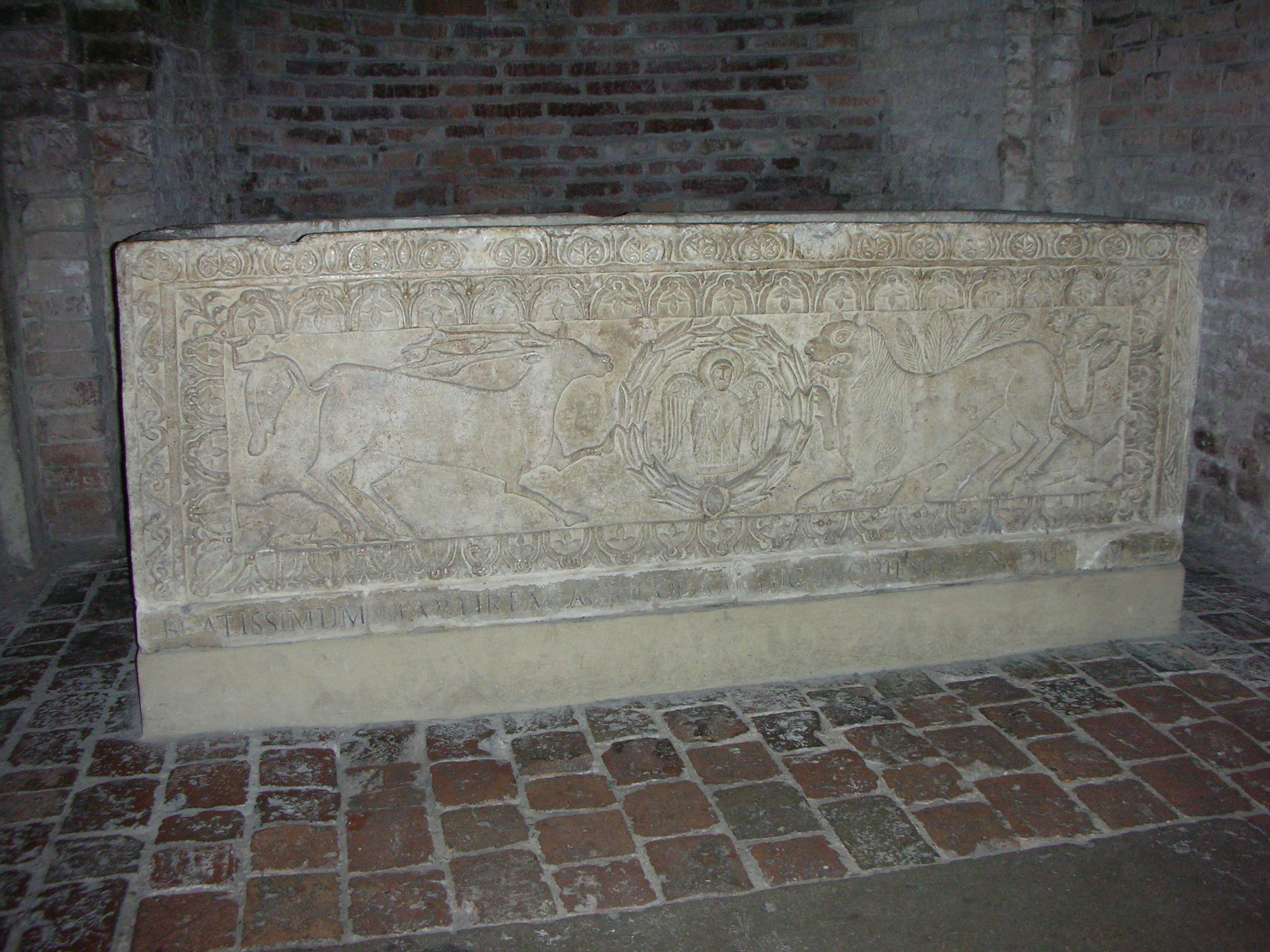
The sarcophagus of Saint Agricola.

Information about Vitalis and Agricola is based on the writings of Ambrose. In 392 or 393, Eusebius, bishop of Bologna, had announced the discovery of the relics of Vitalis and Agricola in a Jewish cemetery in the city. He reburied the relics according to Christian rites, an event at which Ambrose attended. The reburial led to popular veneration of these saints.

The cult of these two martyrs was diffused in Western Europe due to the efforts of Ambrose, who transferred some of the relics to Milan and gave some to Florence. He took some of the blood, parts of the cross, and the nails to Florence, placing these relics in the church erected by a woman named Juliana. On this occasion he delivered an oration in praise of virginity, with special reference to the three virgin daughters of Juliana. His mention of the martyrs Agricola and Vitalis in the first part of the oration is the only source of information on these martyrs' lives ("De exhortatione virginitatis", cc. i-u, in P.L., XVI, 335).

In 396 other relics were sent to Victricus, Bishop of Rouen, and about the same date to Paulinus of Nola and others. The cult had as its center the city of Bologna, where a basilica was built to hold the relics.

The Bolognese church of San Vitale ed Agricola in Arena, is purported to have been built over the remains of a Roman amphitheatre where the martyrdom of Vitalis and Agricola took place in the 4th century. The crypt of the two martyrs dates back to the 11th century.
