= Lazarus Zographos =

9th-century Byzantine Christian saint

Saint Lazarus the Iconographer Λάζαρος Ζωγράφος
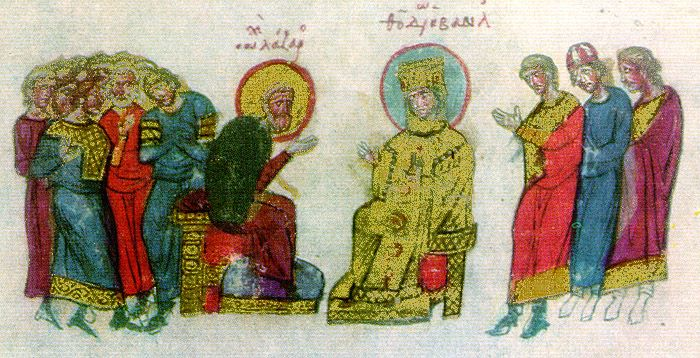
- St. Lazarus discussing theological matters with Empress Theodora

Monk
- Born: 17 November, 810; Armenia
- Died: 28 September, 865 (disputed); Rome
- Venerated in: Orthodox Church; Catholic Church
- Canonized: pre-congregation
- Feast: 23 February (Roman Catholic); 17 November (Orthodox Church)
- Controversy: Opposed Iconoclasm

Lazarus (Greek: Λάζαρος), surnamed Zographos (Ζωγράφος, "the Painter"), was a 9th-century Byzantine Christian saint. He is also known as Lazarus the Painter and Lazarus the Iconographer. Born in Armenia on November 17, 810, he lived before and during the second period of Byzantine Iconoclasm. Lazarus was the first saint to be canonized specifically as an iconographer. He was later followed by Saint Catherine of Bologna.

== Life and times ==
Lazarus became a monk at an early age and is thought to have studied the art of painting at the Stoudios Monastery in Constantinople. Lazarus was noted to possess the following virtues: love for Christ, asceticism, prayer, and rejection of the vanities of the world. He was further recognized for his acts of self-control, discipline and alms-giving. He was ordained a priest. In his lifetime, he was highly regarded and well known for his frescos. He used faith and ritual as a means to transcribe his inner contemplation onto the images he painted. Thus, his ability to paint icons was seen as a gift given by God.

During the reign of Theophilos (r. 829–842), an iconoclast emperor who was opposed to holy images, Lazarus stubbornly continued his craft of painting icons and began restoring images defaced by heretics. Theophilos sought out Lazarus, who was then famous for his painting, and intended to make an example of him.

After being asked several times to stop painting, Lazarus was brought before the emperor, where he refused to destroy any of the images he painted. The emperor discovered that Lazarus was not affected by flattery and bribery. He was threatened with the death penalty, which at the time was not an uncommon outcome for those who favored icons (iconodules). However, Lazarus being a man of the cloth, could not be put to death and so he was instead thrown in prison. During his imprisonment, he was subjected to such "severe torture that his flesh melted away along with his blood." He was left to die of his wounds but recovered. He then began to paint holy images on panels from his prison cell. Hearing of this, Theophilos gave orders to have "sheets of red-hot iron to be applied to the palms of his hands where, as a result, he lost consciousness and lay half dead." It is also said his hands were burned with red-hot horseshoes until his flesh melted to the bone.

As Lazarus lay on his deathbed, the Empress Theodora, an iconodule, convinced Theophilos to release Lazarus from prison. Lazarus found refuge at Tou Phoberou, a secluded church of St. John the Forerunner once located in Phoberos on the Asiatic shore of the Bosporus. The Church is believed to have once functioned as an imperial monastery that housed as many as one hundred and seventy monks. After the death of Theophilos in 842, Theodora asked Lazarus to forgive her husband's actions, to which he replied "God is not so unjust, O, Empress, as to forget our love and labors on his behalf, and attach greater value to that mans hatred and extraordinary insanity." Lazarus served as a model of perseverance for those who had suffered from iconoclast persecution.

== Attributed artworks ==
After the restoration of the icons in 843, Lazarus was again free to pursue his painting. Despite his previous wounds, Lazarus was said to have painted a large fresco of St. John at the Phoberos Monastery. The painted icon was known to have the power to perform cures and miracles. That same year, he also famously restored a portrait of Christ known as the Christ Chalkites (Christ of the Chalke) over the Chalke Gate, a ceremonial entrance of the Great Palace of Constantinople. Neither of these two works survive today. Lazarus was also accredited with the mosaic decoration of the apse of Hagia Sophia within the pilgrim accounts of Antony, Archbishop of Novgorod during a visit to Constantinople. Antony described the mosaic as depicting the Mother of God holding a Child Christ flanked by two angels, which was noted to have been seen by both Emperor Basil l and Michael III (r. 842–867) before his death the same year. However, these accounts are dated several centuries later in c. 1200.

== Ambassador to Rome ==
In 856, Lazarus was served as a diplomat for Michael III, Theophilos and Theodora's son, who sent him as an emissary to visit Pope Benedict III to discuss the possibility of reconciliation between the Catholic Church of Rome and the Orthodox Church, who at this point had very strained relations. In 865, during his second mission to the Pope, Lazarus died at Rome on 28 September, although Raymond Janin disputes the date. He was buried in the Monastery of Evandros, near Constantinople.

The feast day of Saint Lazarus Zographos is 17 November in the Orthodox calendar, and 23 February in the Roman Catholic calendar.
