= November 18 (Eastern Orthodox liturgics) =

Day in the Eastern Orthodox liturgical calendar

Eastern Orthodox liturgical calendar
November 17	November 18	November 19
November 18 O.S. ≍ December 1 N.S. November 18 N.S ≍ November 5 O.S.

An Eastern Orthodox cross

November 18 in Eastern Orthodox liturgical calendars is a feast day and a day of commemoration of saints and martyrs. Although some Orthodox churches use the Revised Julian Calendar and others use the traditional Julian calendar, the fixed commemorations for their respective November 18 are broadly the same, no matter which calendar is used. (Note: Despite the dates being the same, the days to which they refer typically differ by 13 days. The notation Old Style or O.S. is sometimes used to indicate a date in the traditional Julian Calendar (the "Old Calendar"). The notation New Style or N.S. indicates a date in the Revised Julian calendar (the "New Calendar").)

== Saints ==
- Great-martyr Platon of Ancyra (302 or 306) (Note: Name days celebrated today include: Platon (Πλάτωνας).)
- Hieromartyr Romanus the Deacon of Caesarea, with Child-martyr Barulas of Antioch (303) (Note: "At Antioch, the birthday of St. Romanus, martyr, in the time of the emperor Galerius. When the prefect Asclepiades broke into the churches and strove to destroy them completely, Komanus exhorted the Christians to resist him, and after being subjected to dire torments and the cutting out of his tongue (without which, however, he spoke the praises of God), he was strangled in prison and crowned with a glorious martyrdom. Before him suffered a young boy named Barula, who being asked by him whether it was better to worship one God or several gods, and having answered that we must believe in the one God whom the Christians adore, was scourged and beheaded.")
- Martyr Romanus, who suffered under Maximian, at Antioch (304 or 305)
- Martyrs Zacchaeus the Deacon and Alphaeus the Reader, of Caesarea in Palestine (303, 304, or 307)
- Venerable Basil (Note: He is recorded in Parisian Codex 1578, without any other details however.)

== Pre-Schism Western saints ==
- Saint Maximus of Mainz, nineteenth Bishop of Mainz in Germany from 354 to 378, who suffered greatly at the hands of the Arians (378) (Note: "At Mayence, St. Maximus, bishop, who, after suffering much from the Arians, died a confessor, in the time of Constantius.")
- Martyrs Oriculus and Companions, martyrs under the Arian Vandals near Carthage in North Africa (c. 430) (Note: "The same day, the Saints Oriculus and his companions, who suffered for the Catholic faith, in the persecution of the Vandals.")
- Saint Nazarius, a monk and Abbot of Lérins in France (c. 450)
- Saint Mabyn (Mabena), nun of Cornwall (5th century)
- Saint Mawes (Maudetus, Maudez), Bishop in Cornwall and Brittany (5th or 6th century) (Note: Born in Wales, he lived as a hermit near Falmouth in Cornwall, where a village is named after him. Later he went to Brittany where he is known as Saint Maudez and where many churches are dedicated to him.)
- Saint Keverne (Akeveranus), a friend of Saint Kieran or Saint Piran in Cornwall (6th century)
- Saint Mummolus (Mumbolus, Momleolus, Momble), born in Ireland, he was a companion of St. Fursey whom he succeeded as Abbot of Lagny in France (c. 690)
- Saints Amandus (708) and Anselm (c. 750), Abbots of Lérins Abbey (Note: St. Amandus succeeded St. Aigulphus as Abbot of Lérins in France in 676. St. Anselm, another Abbot of Lérins, lived later in the eighth century.)
- Saint Constant, priest-hermit at Lough Erne in Ireland (777)
- Saint Odo of Cluny (942) (Note: "At Tours, the departure from this life of blessed Odo, abbot of Cluny.")

== Post-Schism Orthodox saints ==
- Saint Helen Devochkina, Abbess of Novodevichy Convent, Moscow (1547)
- New Martyr Anastasius of Paramythia in Epirus, by beheading (1750), and Saint Daniel (Musa) of Corfu (18th century) (Note: Anastasius and his sister were Greek peasants living in Epirus under Ottoman rule. One day a band of Turks came through their village, led by Musa, the son of the local Pasha (Governor). Musa was struck by the beauty of Anastasius' sister and tried to seize her, but Anastasius threw himself at the Turks and fought them off long enough for his sister to escape. Musa's father had Anastasius arrested and brought before him and, impressed by his courage, attempted to convert him to Islam by many means: threats, beatings, and offers of worldly honor; but Anastasius held firm and was cast into prison. Musa was moved by the way that Anastasius bore all these trials and temptations, and wanted to know more about the Faith that sustained him. Going secretly to Anastasius' prison cell, he peered in and saw two young men of shining appearance with the prisoner. They vanished as soon as Musa entered. Anastasius told Musa that these were angels who guard and aid every Christian, especially when they suffer for Christ. He also explained in a simple way the Gospel of Jesus Christ, which enables His followers to set little value upon worldly things. Musa, deeply moved, threw himself at Anastasius' feet and asked to become a Christian. Anastasius told him to wait until the proper time, because his conversion would cause his father to persecute all the Christians under his power. A few days later, in 1750, Anastasius was beheaded by order of the Pasha. Soon after this, Musa visited the tomb of a holy Martyr and was granted a vision of Anastasius, who appeared to him encircled in light and urged him to continue on the road to Christ. Musa fled his father's domain to the Peleponnese where he received direction in the Faith from an aged ascetic. He then traveled to Venice to be baptized without fear of reprisal by the Turks. In time he became a monk on Corfu, receiving the monastic name of Daniel. He lived there in asceticism, but the desire grew in him to taste martyrdom for Christ, so he traveled to Constantinople to declare his conversion to the Muslims. But the Christians there dissuaded him, knowing that the conversion of such a prominent Turk would, if it were known, lead to retaliation against Christians. Saint Daniel returned to Corfu, where he founded a church in honor of St. Anastasius and reposed in peace.)
- Venerable Saint Nectarie (Crețu) the Protopsaltes, of Prodromou Skete (Nectarius the Vlach), hesychastic monk and a great chanter called the 'Nightingale of Mt. Athos' (1899) (Note: He was glorified by the Ecumenical Patriarchate on October 18, 2025. The official communiqué of the Ecumenical Patriarchate was as follows: (in Greek) Τό Ἱερόν Σῶμα ἀπεφάσισεν ὁμοφώνως, κατόπιν αἰτήματος τοῦ Μακ. Πατριάρχου Ρουμανίας κ. Δανιήλ, τήν κατάταξιν εἰς τό ἁγιολόγιον τῆς Ἐκκλησίας τῶν ἐν Ἄθωνι ἀσκησάντων ὁσιακῆς βιοτῆς Ἱερομονάχου Νήφωνος Ionescu Προδρομίτου (1799-1899) καί Μοναχοῦ Νεκταρίου Cretu (Πρωτοψάλτου) (1804-1899).) (Note: See: (in Romanian) Nectarie Crețu. Wikipedia. (Romanian Wikipedia).)
- New Hieroconfessor Nicholas Vinogradov, Archpriest, of Malakhovo, Yaroslavl (1948)

== Other commemorations ==
- Synaxis of All Saints of Estonia (Note: See: (in Russian) Собор святых земли Эстонской. Википедии. (Russian Wikipedia).)
- Translation of the relics of St. Cosmas (Kosmas) the Protos of Vatopedi (1276) (Note: His relics are located in the Church of the Protaton at Karyes on Mount Athos.)
- Repose of Schema-Archimandrite Vitaly Sidorenko of Glinsk and Tbilisi (1992)

== Icon gallery ==
Great-martyr Platon of Ancyra.
(Menologion of Basil II, 10th century).

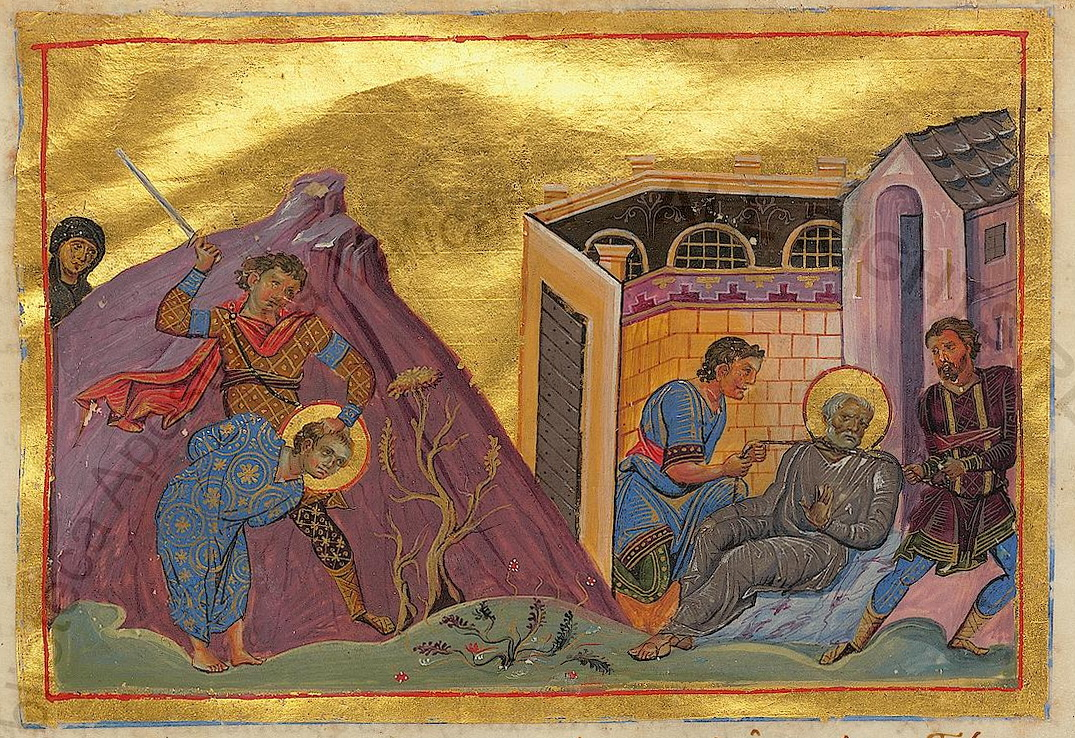
Hieromartyr Romanus the Deacon of Caesarea with Child-martyr Barulas of Antioch.
(Menologion of Basil II, 10th century).

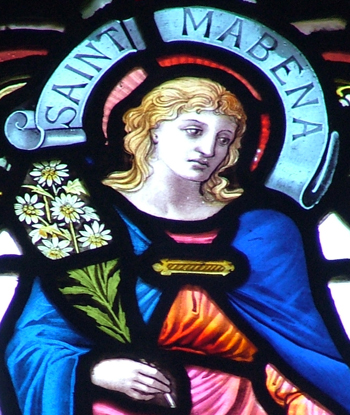
St. Mabyn (Mabena).

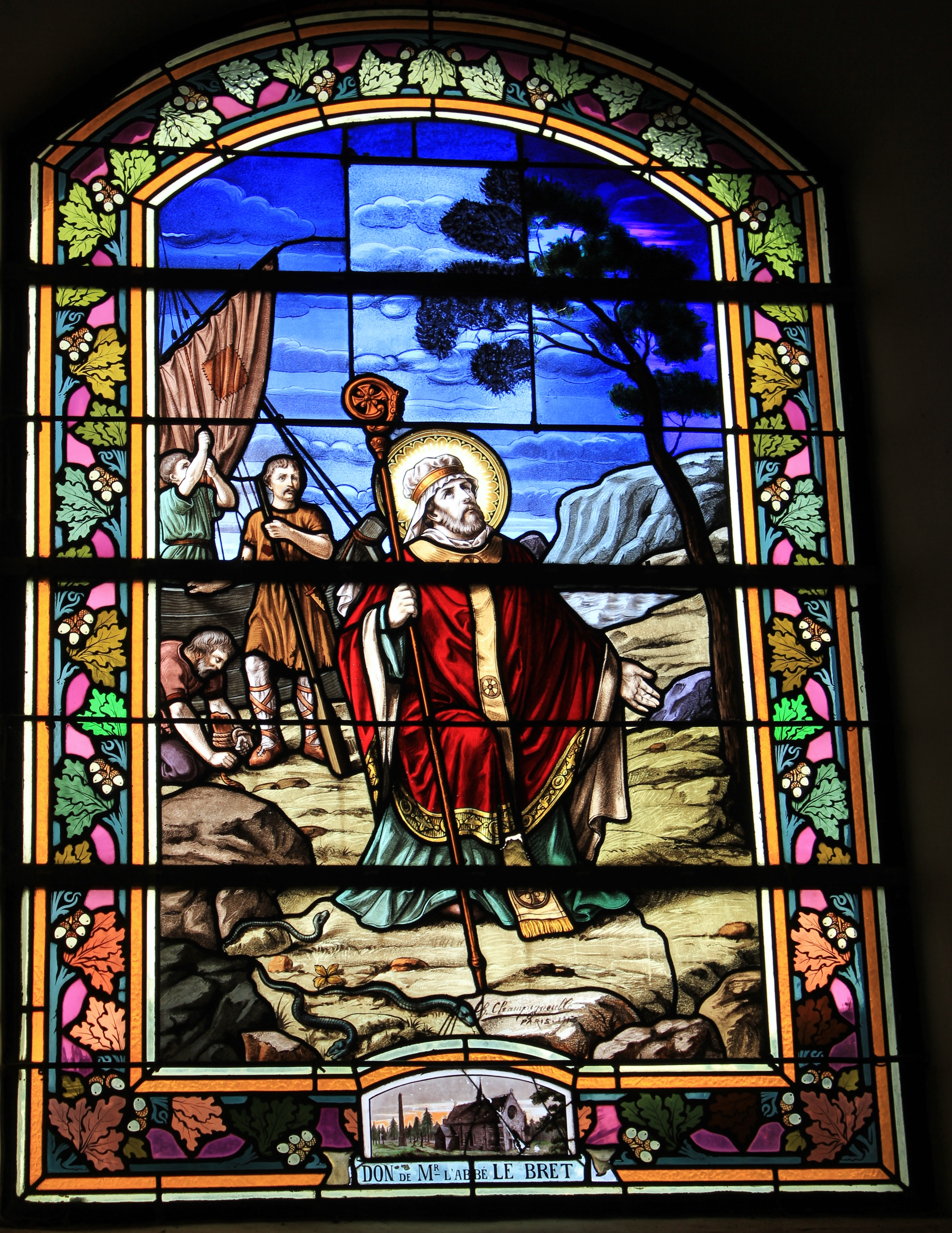
St. Mawes (Maudetus, Maudez), Bishop in Cornwall and Brittany.

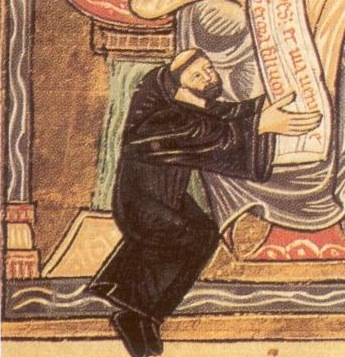
St. Odo of Cluny.

== Sources ==
- November 18 / December 1. Orthodox Calendar (PRAVOSLAVIE.RU).
- December 1 / November 18. Holy Trinity Russian Orthodox Church (A parish of the Patriarchate of Moscow).
- November 18. OCA - The Lives of the Saints.
- The Autonomous Orthodox Metropolia of Western Europe and the Americas (ROCOR). St. Hilarion Calendar of Saints for the year of our Lord 2004. St. Hilarion Press (Austin, TX). p. 86.
- The Eighteenth Day of the Month of November. Orthodoxy in China.
- November 18. Latin Saints of the Orthodox Patriarchate of Rome.
- The Roman Martyrology. Transl. by the Archbishop of Baltimore. Last Edition, According to the Copy Printed at Rome in 1914. Revised Edition, with the Imprimatur of His Eminence Cardinal Gibbons. Baltimore: John Murphy Company, 1916. pp. 355–356.
- Rev. Richard Stanton. A Menology of England and Wales, or, Brief Memorials of the Ancient British and English Saints Arranged According to the Calendar, Together with the Martyrs of the 16th and 17th Centuries. London: Burns & Oates, 1892. pp. 554–557.

Greek Sources

- Great Synaxaristes: (in Greek) 18 ΝΟΕΜΒΡΙΟΥ. ΜΕΓΑΣ ΣΥΝΑΞΑΡΙΣΤΗΣ.
- (in Greek) Συναξαριστής. 18 Νοεμβρίου. ECCLESIA.GR. (H ΕΚΚΛΗΣΙΑ ΤΗΣ ΕΛΛΑΔΟΣ).
- (in Greek) November 18. Ορθόδοξος Συναξαριστής.

Russian Sources

- (in Russian) 1 декабря (18 ноября). Православная Энциклопедия под редакцией Патриарха Московского и всея Руси Кирилла (электронная версия). (Orthodox Encyclopedia - Pravenc.ru).
- (in Russian) 18 ноября по старому стилю / 1 декабря по новому стилю. Русская Православная Церковь - Православный церковный календарь на 2018 год.
