= Parrobus of Pottole =

Bishop of Neapolis (Naples)

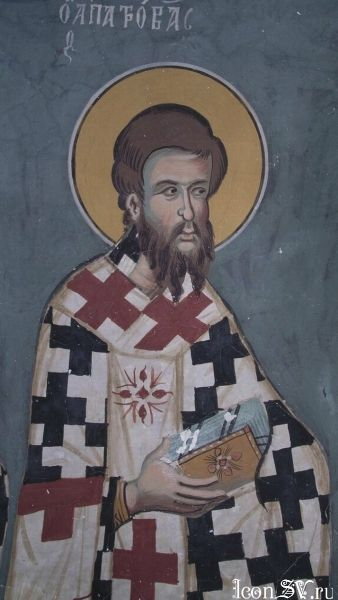

Patrobas of Pottole, sometimes Patrobos, or Patrobus (Greek: Πατροβᾶς), is numbered among the seventy disciples. He was Bishop of Neapolis (Naples) or of Pottole (cf. recounting of Dorotheus below), and is referred to in Scripture when St Paul greets him in his Epistle to the Romans. The Church remembers St. Patrobas on November 5, with his fellow apostles Ss. Hermas, Linus, Gaius and Philologos.

== See also ==
- St. Nikolai Velimirovic, The Prologue from Ohrid
