= Hermas =

Hermas is a masculine given name. Notable people with the name include:

- Hermas of Dalmatia (1st century), one of the Seventy Disciples, feast day April 8
- Hermas of Philippopolis (1st century), one of the Seventy Disciples, feast day May 31
- Hermas (freedman) (2nd century), Christian mystic
- Hermas Deslauriers (1879–1941), Canadian physician

It is also a plant genus:

- Hermas (plant), a genus in the carrot family Apiaceae

== See also ==
- Joseph-Hermas
- Saint-Hermas
- Hermes of Philippopolis
