= Sevastijan Dabović =

Serbian Orthodox saint

Saint Sevastijan Dabović Севастијан Дабовић
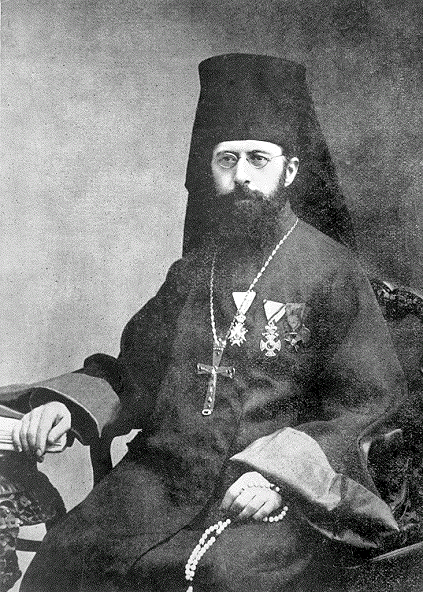
- Dabović in the 1930s
- Born: June 9, 1863; San Francisco, California, US
- Died: November 30, 1940 (aged 77); Žiča Monastery, Kraljevo, Kingdom of Yugoslavia
- Venerated in: Eastern Orthodox Church
- Canonized: May 30, 2015, Church of Saint Sava, Belgrade, Serbia by the Serbian Orthodox Church
- Feast: November 30

Archimandrite Sevastijan (Sebastian, Serbian Cyrillic: Архимандрит Севастијан, secular name John Dabovich or Jovan Dabović; June 9, 1863 – November 30, 1940) was a Serbian-American monk and missionary who became the first Serbian Orthodox monk naturalized in North America. He is canonized as a Serbian Orthodox saint.

== Life ==
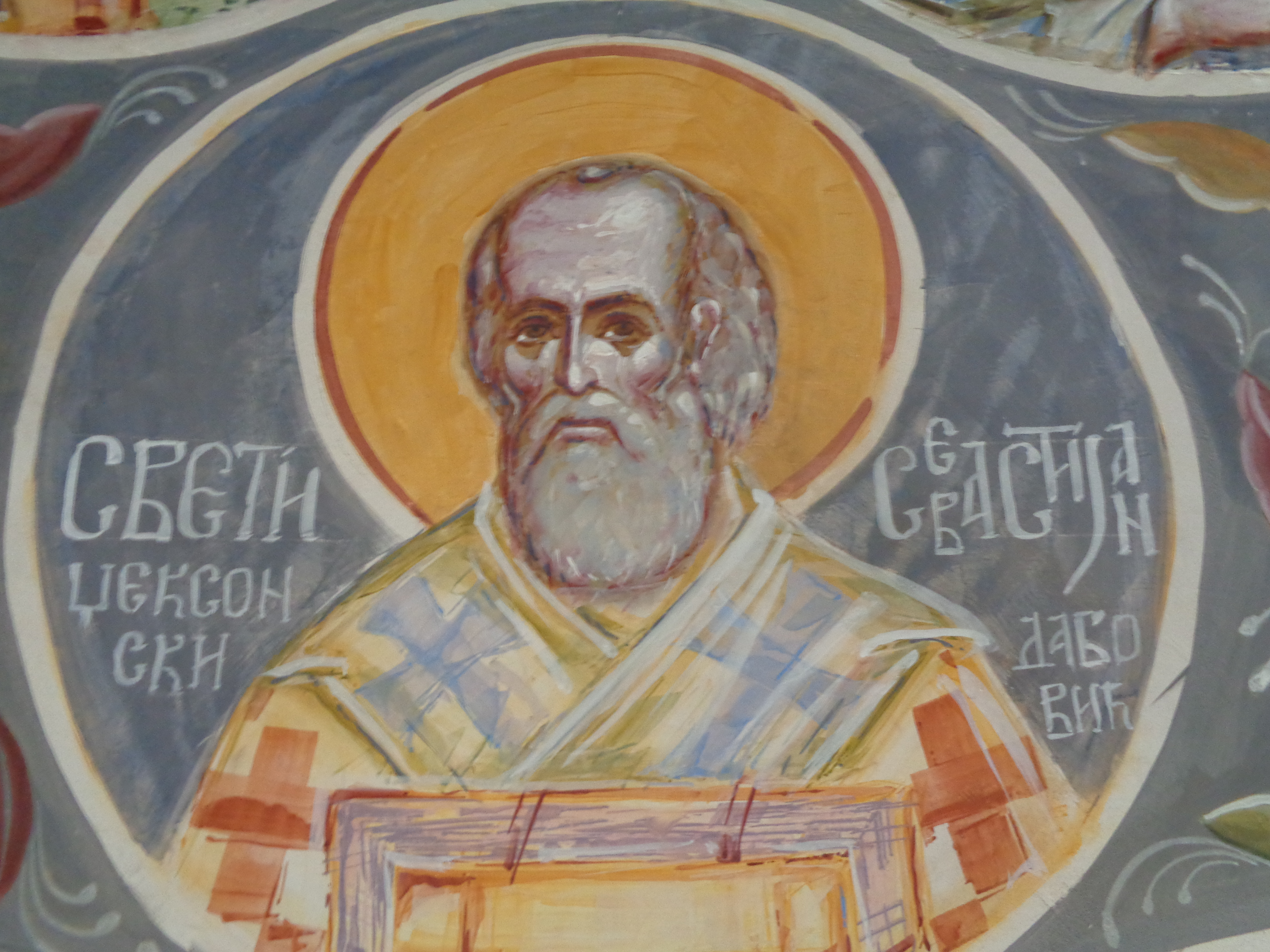
Icon of Sevastijan Dabović in the Church of Saint Jovan Vladimir in Bar, Montenegro

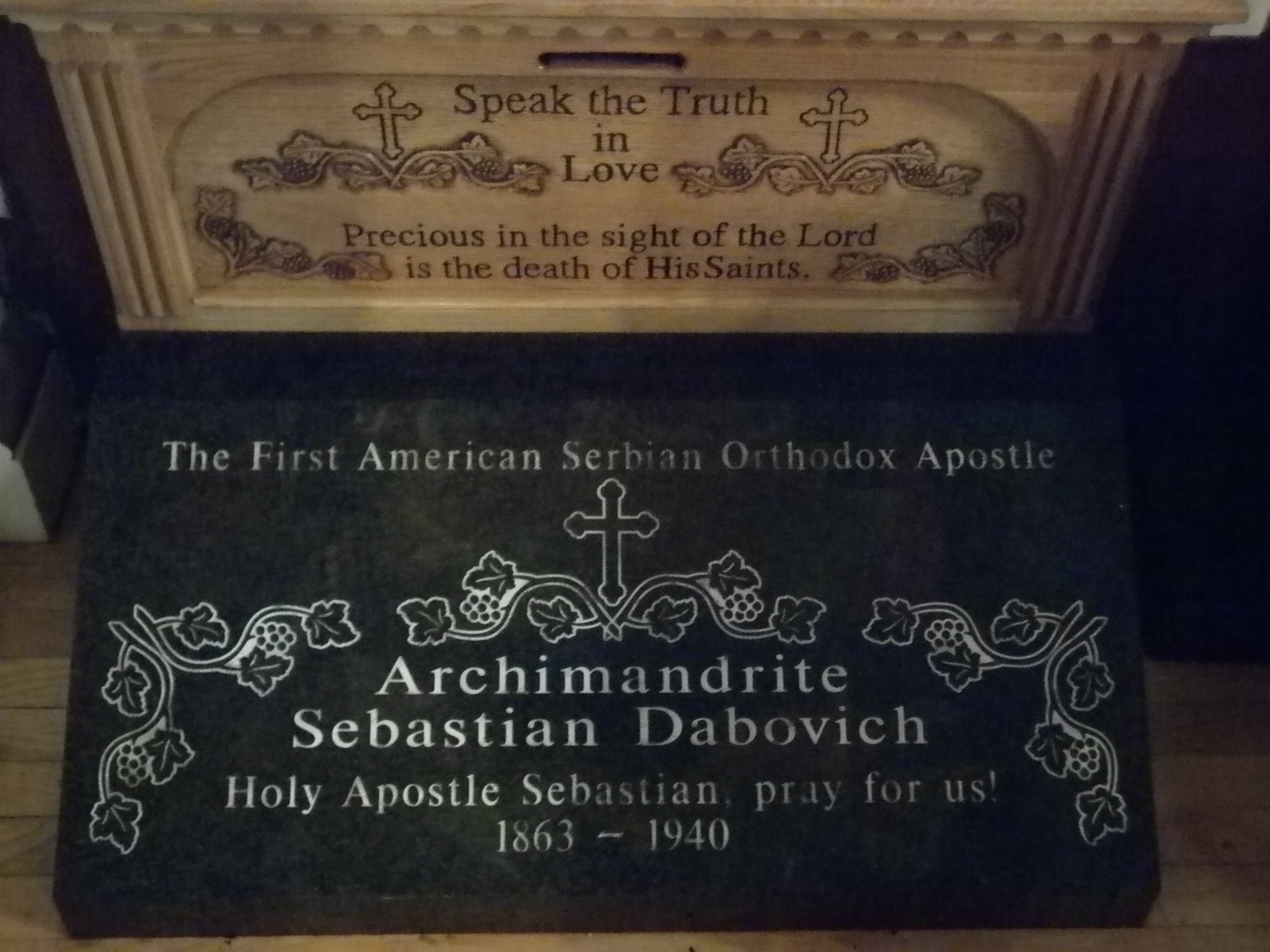
Dabović's relics are interned at the Church of St. Sava in Jackson, California

Sevastijan Dabović was born on 9 June (Julian Calendar) / 21 June (Gregorian Calendar) 1863 in San Francisco, California, as the child of Serbian immigrants from the town of Risan in the Bay of Kotor. At his baptism, he was named Jovan. Later, he was ordained as a monk (Sebastijan) during his schooling in Russia and became a hierodeacon in 1887, and a hieromonk on August 16, 1892. In 1892, Sebastian was ordained as the first native-born Orthodox priest in the United States. He was soon sent to Minneapolis, Minnesota, to replace Fr. Alexis Toth as the priest of St. Mary's Church there.

The first Serbian Orthodox parish in the United States was founded by Dabović in Jackson, California, in 1892. Dabović soon initiated the construction of the first Serbian Orthodox church in the United States, the Saint Sava Serbian Orthodox Church in Jackson, which was consecrated in 1894. Dabović is also credited with founding several additional Serbian Orthodox churches in the United States.

Dabović was appointed as a missionary in California and Washington. It is believed that he baptized more people than any priest in the Western Hemisphere. Dabović's friend Nikolaj Velimirović called him the "greatest Serbian missionary of modern times". Some of the places where he did this include Seattle, Washington (the future St. Spiridon Cathedral), where he served as a temporary priest before Fr. Ambrose Vretta's arrival in November 1895; Portland, Oregon; and Butte, Montana (the future Holy Trinity Church).

He was known as an apostle to émigré Serbs who settled in America.

During the turn of the century, Sebastian corresponded with Rev. Francis J. Hall, D.D., of the Anglican confession on the subject of inter-relations between the two Communions. In 1902, he continued his missionary activities, returning to Alaska as dean of the Sitka deanery. While he was in Alaska, he helped establish Saint Sava Church in Douglas.

From 1904 to 1910, he led the Serbian Mission from its center at the Holy Resurrection Serbian Orthodox Church in Chicago, where he also served as the parish priest. In 1910, Sebastian asked for a release from the Serbian parish so that he could return to missionary work. Then, a year or so later, he joined the faculty of the newly opened St. Platon Seminary in Tenafly, New Jersey. Shortly thereafter he asked release so that he could serve as a chaplain in the Serbian army during World War I.

Dabović also had ties to Nikola Tesla, a Serbian American inventor who financially supported him.

Dabović died on November 30, 1940, at the Žiča Monastery in Kraljevo, which at the time was part of the Kingdom of Yugoslavia. He was buried at the monastery by Velimirović. Dabović's remains were transferred to Jackson in 2007.

The Serbian Orthodox Church canonized Dabović at the Holy Assembly in Belgrade on May 30, 2015.

Dabović was awarded the Order of Saint Sava and the Order of Prince Danilo I.

== Writings ==
- The Lives of the Saints (1898)
- The Holy Orthodox Church (1898)
- Preaching in the Russian Church (1899)
