= Philologus of Sinope =

Philologus of Sinope (Greek: Φιλόλογος ό Σινώπιος) was an early bishop of Sinope.

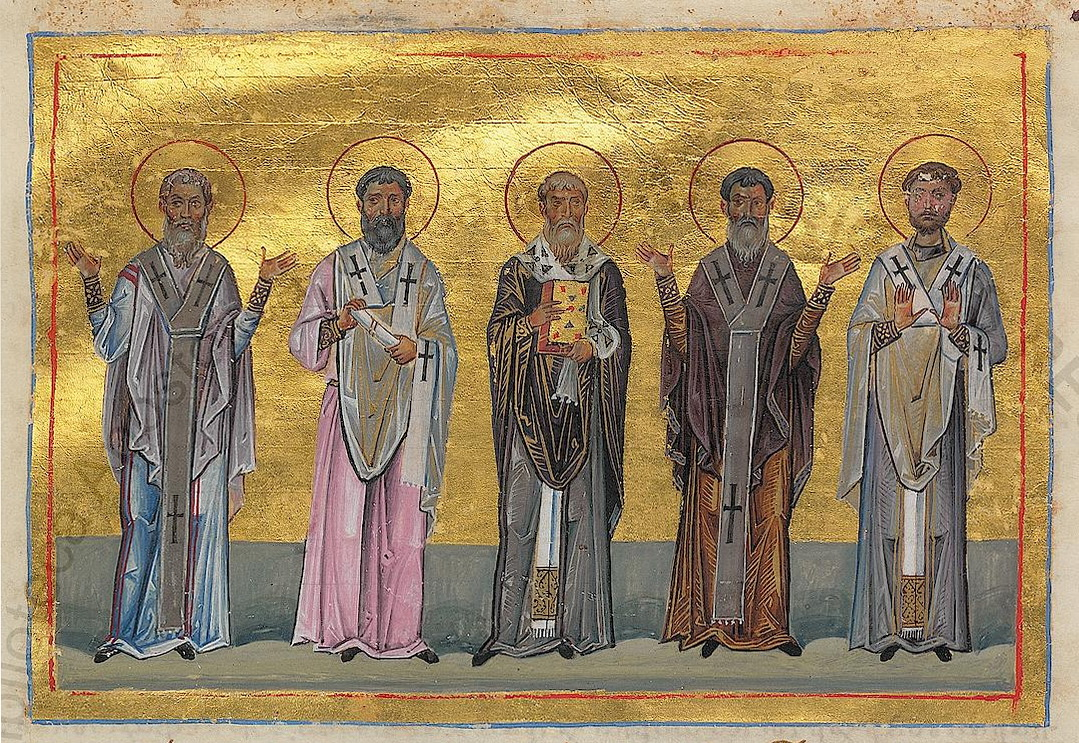
Patrobulus, Hermas, Linus, Caius, Philologus of 70 disciples (Menologion of Basil II)

He is commemorated with them on January 4. He is also commemorated on November 5 together with Ss. Patrobas, Hermas, Linus, and Gaius. Hippolytus of Rome numbered them among the Seventy Disciples.

He was possibly was the father of Marcion of Sinope, founder of Marcionism.

== Hymns ==
Troparion (Tone 3)

Holy apostle Philologus of the Seventy;
Entreat the merciful;
To grant our souls forgiveness of transgressions.

Kontakion (Tone 4)

The Church ever sees you as a shining star, O apostle Philologus,
Your miracles have manifested great enlightenment.
Therefore we cry out to Christ:
"Save those who with faith honor Your apostle, O Most Merciful One."
