= Galaction and Episteme =

Syrian saint of the 3rd century

Saints Galaction and Episteme
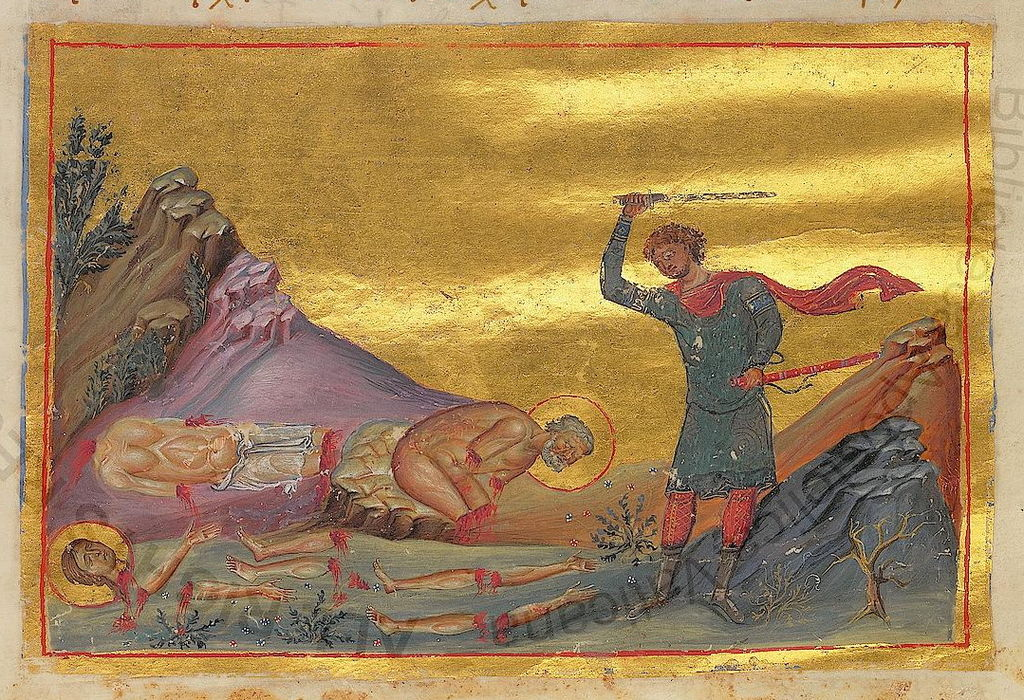
- Martyrdom of Saint Galaction and his wife Saint Episteme at Emesa, from the Menologion of Basil II

Martyrs
- Died: 251 AD; Emesa
- Venerated in: Roman Catholic Church; Eastern Orthodox Church
- Canonized: Pre-Congregation
- Feast: November 5 (Roman Catholic, Eastern Orthodox)

Saint Galaction (also Galaktion, sometimes Galation) was a 3rd-century Syrian Christian, martyred with his wife, Episteme (Epistima), whom he had converted to the Christian faith (Greek: Γαλακτίων και Επιστήμη).

== Life ==
He was the son of Kletophon and Leukippe, who were a rich and distinguished, but initially childless, pagan couple. When the couple was converted after being evangelized by a travelling monk/priest/beggar on the promise that the one, true God would hear their prayers and grant them a child, Galaction was conceived and born.

Galaction hoped from the beginning to live the monastic life, but he submitted in obedience to his parents and was betrothed to the beautiful pagan woman Episteme. During the course of their engagement, over subsequent visits Galaction converted first his fiancée and then her servant, Eutolmius. The couple went away to the mountain of Publion: Galaction to a men's monastery, and Episteme to an abbey. They did not leave their monasteries, and neither saw the other until their deaths.

A fierce persecution arose, and both were brought to trial. When Galaction was martyred under Emperor Decius at Emesa (now Homs, Syria) in 251 AD, Episteme went to his side and was killed with him. His feast day is November 5.
