= Gaius of Ephesus =

Bishop of Ephesus

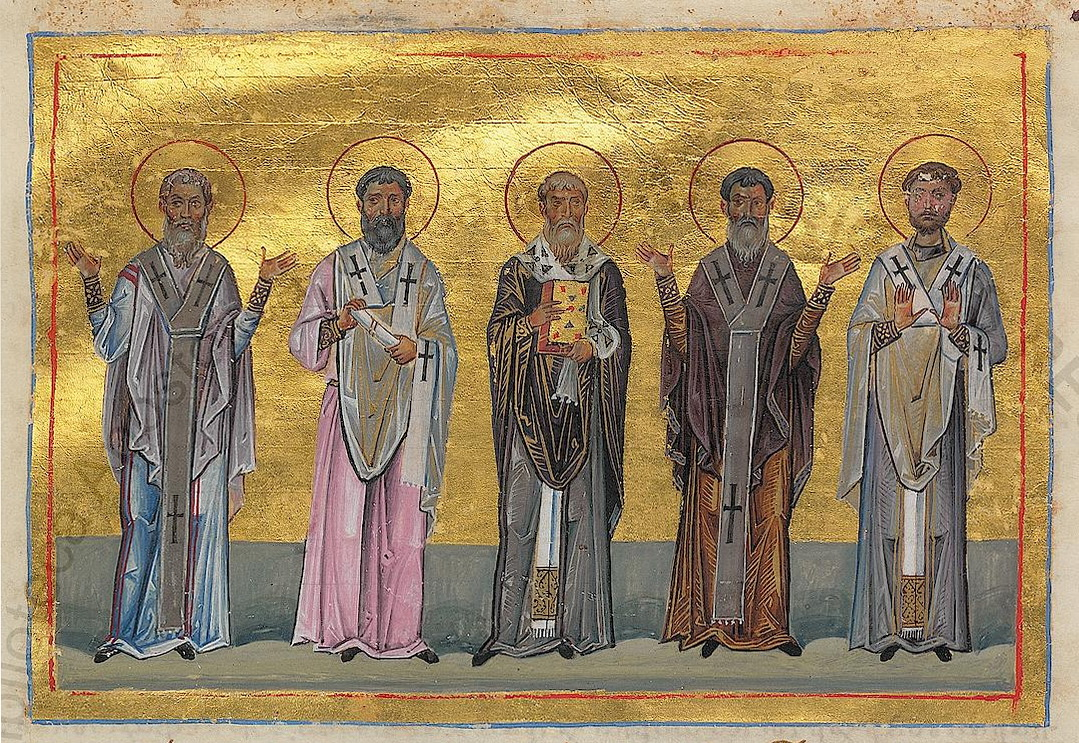
Patrobulus, Hermas, Linus, Caius, Philologus of 70 disciples (Menologion of Basil II)

Gaius of Ephesus (Greek: Γάϊος ό Εφέσιος) is numbered among the Seventy Disciples. He was Bishop of Ephesus (Romans 16:23).

The Eastern Orthodox Church and Roman Catholic Church remember St. Gaius on January 4 among the Seventy, and on November 5.

== Possible reference in scripture ==
It has been suggested that this is the Gaius to whom the general epistle 3 John was addressed.

== Sources ==
St. Nikolai Velimirovic, The Prologue from Ohrid
