= Eustathios (governor of the Cibyrrhaeot Theme) =

Eustathios (Greek: Εὐστάθιος) was the Byzantine governor (strategos) of the Cibyrrhaeot Theme in ca. 909–912.

Eustathios is only mentioned by the De Administrando Imperio, a work compiled in the middle of the 10th century by Constantine VII Porphyrogennetos. According to it, in approximately 909/910, he was protospatharios, asekretis, and ek prosopou of the Cibyrrhaeot Theme. Use of the title ek prosopou ("representative") is ambiguous in the sources, and modern scholars suggest that he was actually the military governor (strategos) of the Cibyrrhaeots, rather than the governor's deputy. He came into conflict with the katepano of the Mardaites, a certain Staurakios Platys. Although both were proteges of the powerful logothetes tou dromou, Himerios, Eustathios clashed with Staurakios over their jurisdiction, as the latter held his appointment directly from the emperor and was wont to disregard the instructions of the theoretically superior strategos. After remonstrances to Emperor Leo VI the Wise, Staurakios was recalled, and his authority transferred to Eustathios.

As Eustathios remained in office until late 912, when he was replaced by Emperor Alexander with the protospatharios Niketas, he is most likely to be identified with the anonymous strategos of the Cibyrrhaeots who was responsible for the equipment of a fleet and crews in preparation for Himerios' great naval expedition in 911, directed against the Emirate of Crete or the coasts of Syria.

== Sources ==
- Lilie, Ralph-Johannes; Ludwig, Claudia; Pratsch, Thomas; Zielke, Beate (2013). Prosopographie der mittelbyzantinischen Zeit Online. Berlin-Brandenburgische Akademie der Wissenschaften. Nach Vorarbeiten F. Winkelmanns erstellt (in German). Berlin and Boston: De Gruyter.
