= December 1 (Eastern Orthodox liturgics) =

Day in the Eastern Orthodox liturgical calendar

Eastern Orthodox liturgical calendar
| November 30 | December 1 | December 2 |
December 1 O.S. ≍ December 14 N.S. December 1 N.S ≍ November 18 O.S.

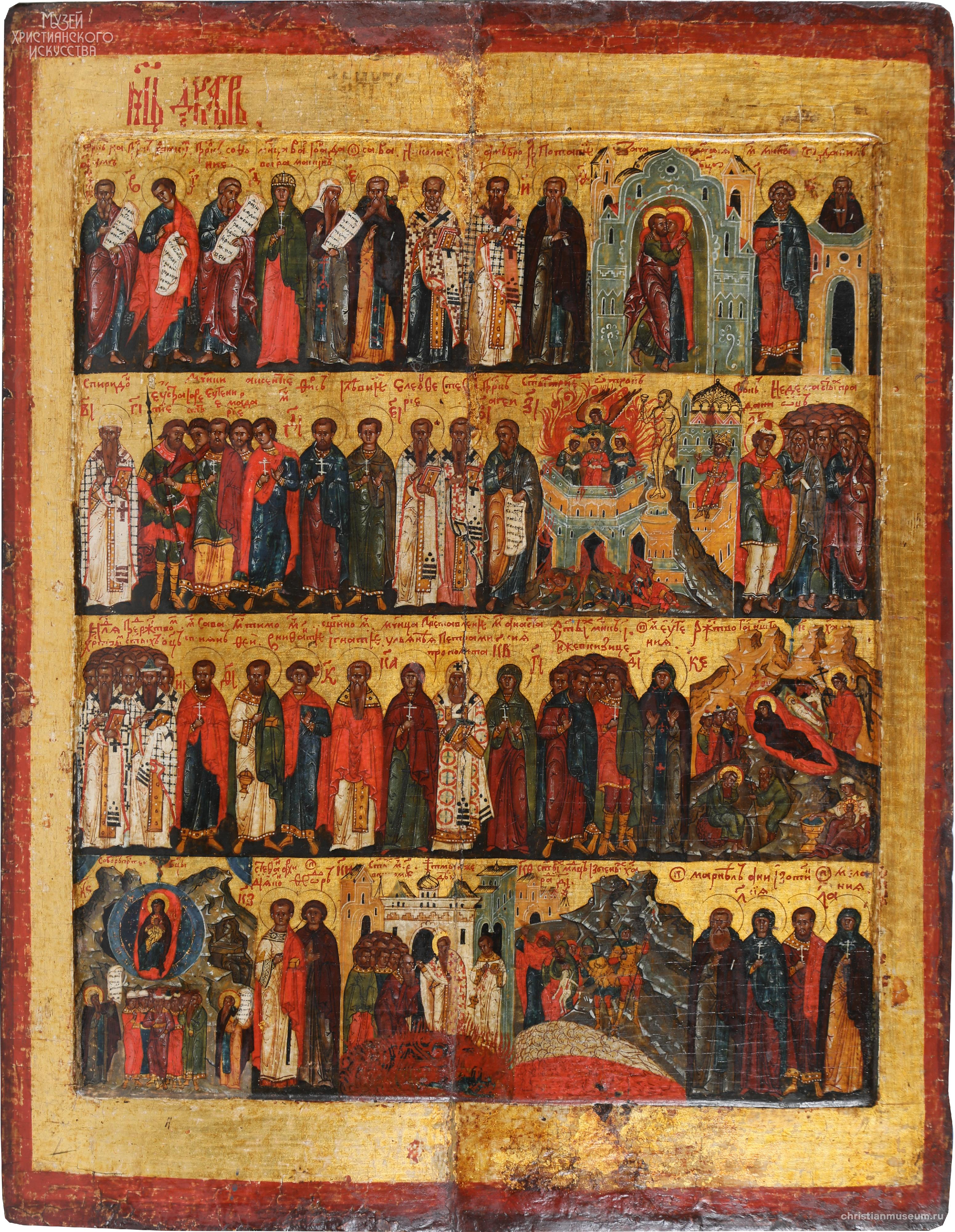
Menaion calendar icon: one day = one saint

December 1 in Eastern Orthodox liturgical calendars is a feast day and a day of commemoration of saints and martyrs. Although some Orthodox churches use the Revised Julian Calendar and others use the traditional Julian calendar, the fixed commemorations for their respective December 1 are broadly the same, no matter which calendar is used. (Note: Despite the dates being the same, the days to which they refer typically differ by 13 days. The notation Old Style or O.S. is sometimes used to indicate a date in the traditional Julian Calendar (the "Old Calendar"). The notation New Style or N.S. indicates a date in the Revised Julian calendar (the "New Calendar").)

== Saints ==
- Prophet Nahum (7th century BC) (Note: "THE prophet Nahum, who was buried in Begabar.")
- Saint Onesimus, Archbishop of Ephesus (c. 107–117)
- Saints Ananias and Solochonus, Archbishops of Ephesus (see also: December 2)
- Hieromartyr Ananias of Persia (345) (Note: Saint Ananias, together with Saint Abdecalas (a Persian priest of advanced age), and about a hundred other Christians, were killed under the Persian ruler Shapur II on Good Friday, 345. While Saint Ananias was being tortured for his belief in Christ, he said, "I see a ladder leading to heaven, and radiant men calling me to a marvelous city of light".)
- Saint Porphyrios, Patriarch of Antioch (404-413)
- Righteous Philaret (Philaretos) the Merciful of Amnia in Asia Minor (792)
- Saint Anthony the New, monk of Kios in Bithynia (865)
- Saint Theokletos, Archbishop of Lacedaemon (Sparta) (870)

== Pre-Schism Western saints ==
- Saint Castritian, predecessor of St Calimerius as Bishop of Milan, was bishop for forty-two years (137) (Note: "At Milan, St. Castritian, bishop, who was eminent for virtues and the practice of pious and religious deeds in very troublous times for the Church.")
- Hieromartyrs Diodorus and Marianus, and Companions, martyrs in Rome under Numerian (c. 283) (Note: "At Rome, the holy martyrs Diodorus, priest, and Marian, deacon, with many others, who by the command of the emperor Numerian, were made partakers of the glory of martyrdom.")
- Martyr Olympiades (Olympias), a noble from Rome (ex-consul) martyred in Amelia in Italy under Diocletian (c. 303) (Note: "At Amelia, in Umbria, St. Olympias, ex-consul, who was converted to the faith by blessed Firmina, and being tortured on the rack, consummated his martyrdom under Diocletian.")
- Saint Ansanus, called The Baptizer or The Apostle of Siena (304) (Note: "The same day, St. Ansanus, martyr, who confessed Christ at Rome, and was cast into prison, in the time of the emperor Diocletian. Being afterwards conducted to Siena, in Tuscany, he there ended the course of his martyrdom by decapitation.")
- Martyrs Lucius, Rogatus, Cassian and Candida, in Rome
- Saint Ursicinus of Brescia, Bishop of Brescia in Italy, he took part in the Council of Sardica (347)
- Hieromartyr Evasius, first Bishop of Asti in Piedmont in Italy, martyred under Julian the Apostate (c. 362)
- Saint Leontius, Bishop of Fréjus in France from c. 419 to c. 432, a great friend of Saint John Cassian who dedicated his first ten Conferences to him (c. 432)
- Saint Candres of Maastricht, bishop who enlightened the Maastricht area (5th century)
- Hieromartyr Proculus of Narni or Terni, martyred by Totila, King of the Goths (c. 542) (Note: "At Narni, St. Proculus, bishop and martyr, who after performing many good works, was beheaded by order of Totila, king of the Goths.")
- Saint Tudwal, Bishop of Lan Pabu (see also: November 30)
- Saint Constantian, born in Auvergne, he became a monk at Micy (Orleans), and founded a monastery at Javron (c. 570)
- Saint Agericus (Aguy, Airy), Bishop, successor of St Desiderius in Verdun in France (591)
- Saint Eligius (Eloi, Eloy), Bishop of Noyon (Neth.) (660) (Note: "At Noyon, St. Eligius, bishop, whose life is rendered illustrious by a considerable number of miracles.")
- Saint Grwst the Confessor, in the Welsh Kingdom of Gwynedd (7th century)

== Post-Schism Orthodox saints ==
- Saint Anastasia Șaguna, mother of Holy Hierarch Andrei Șaguna (1836) (Note: See: (in Romanian) Anastasia Șaguna. Wikipedia. (Romanian Wikipedia).)

=== New martyrs and confessors ===
- New Hieromartyr Innocent Letyaev, Archbishop of Kharkov and Akhtyra (1937) (Note: See: (in Russian) Иннокентий (Летяев). Википедии. (Russian Wikipedia).)

== Other commemorations ==
- Translation of the relics of Venerable Botolph (Botwulf) of Thorney, Abbot and Confessor, of Ikanhoe, England (680)
- Translation of the relics (1631) of Saint John (Elias, Ilya), Archbishop and Wonderworker of Novgorod (1186), by Metropolitan Cyprian of Novgorod.
- Repose of Righteous Virgin Barbara Shulaeva of Pilna (1980)

== Icon gallery ==
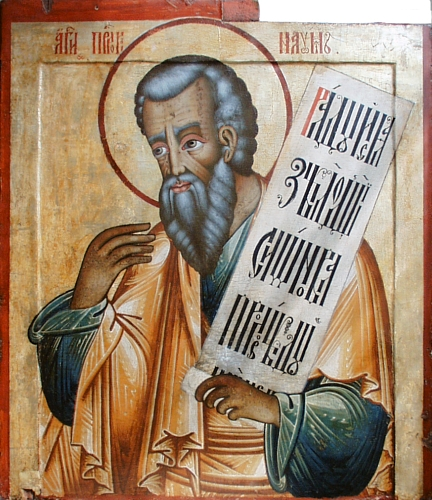
Prophet Nahum (Russian icon, first quarter of the 18th century).

Prophet Nahum.
(Menologion of Basil II, 10th century).

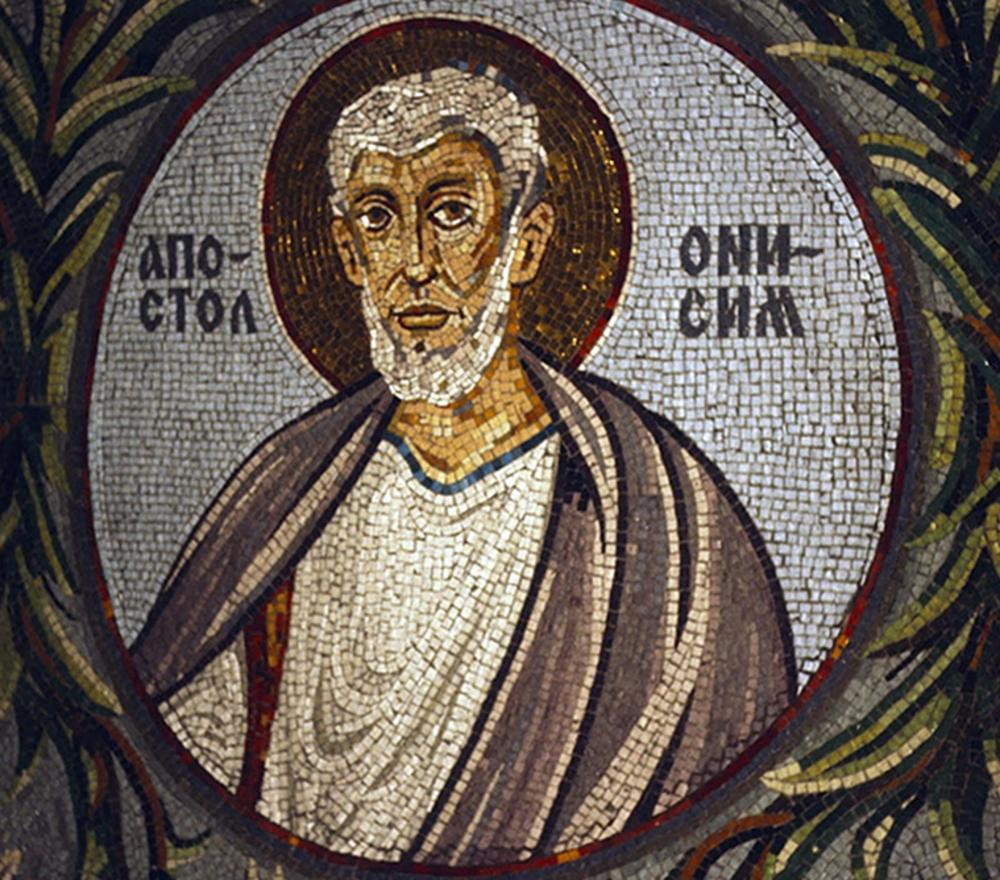
St. Onesimus, Archbishop of Ephesus.

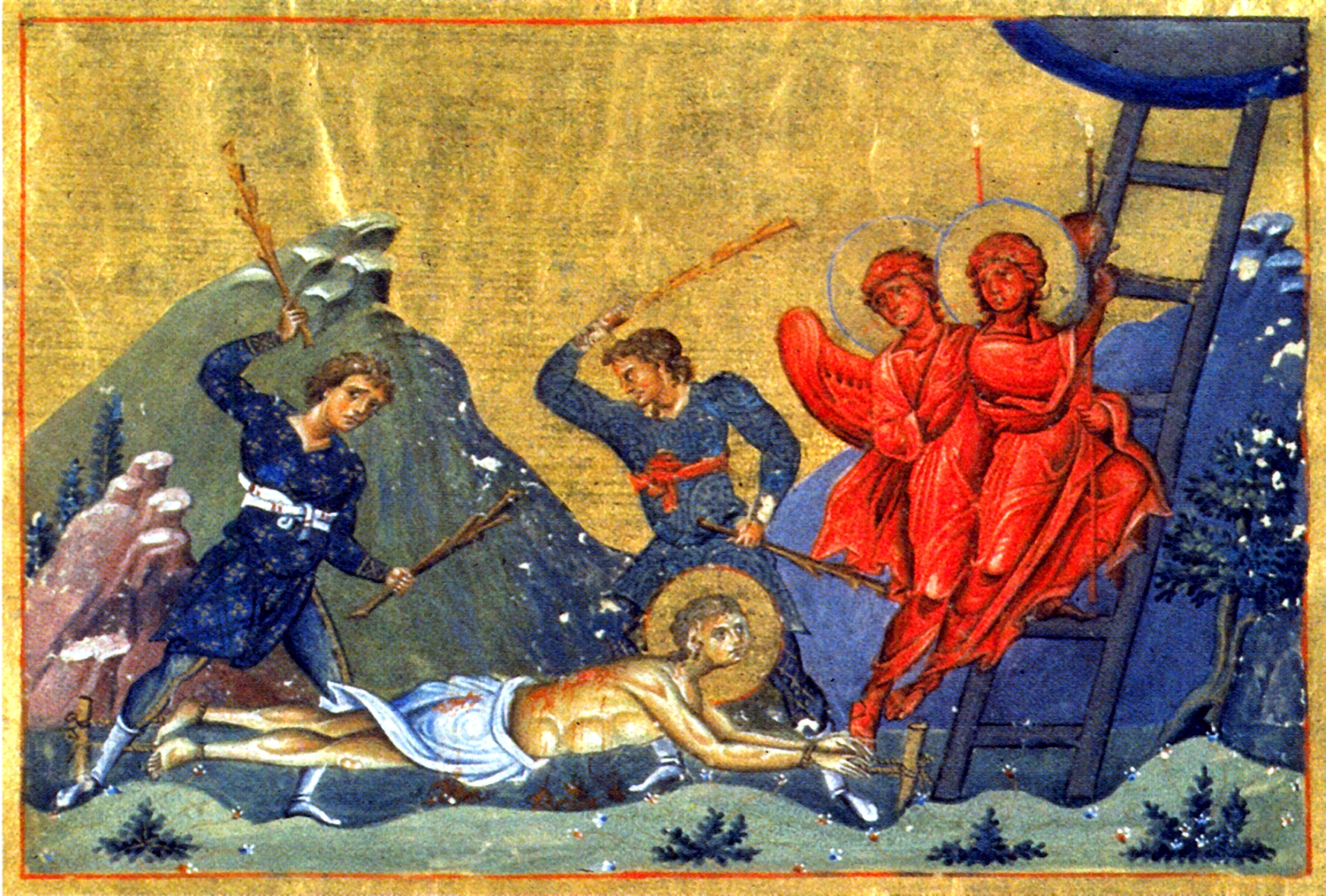
Martyrdom of St. Ananias of Persia, with the ladder leading to heaven.
(Menologion of Basil II, 10th century).

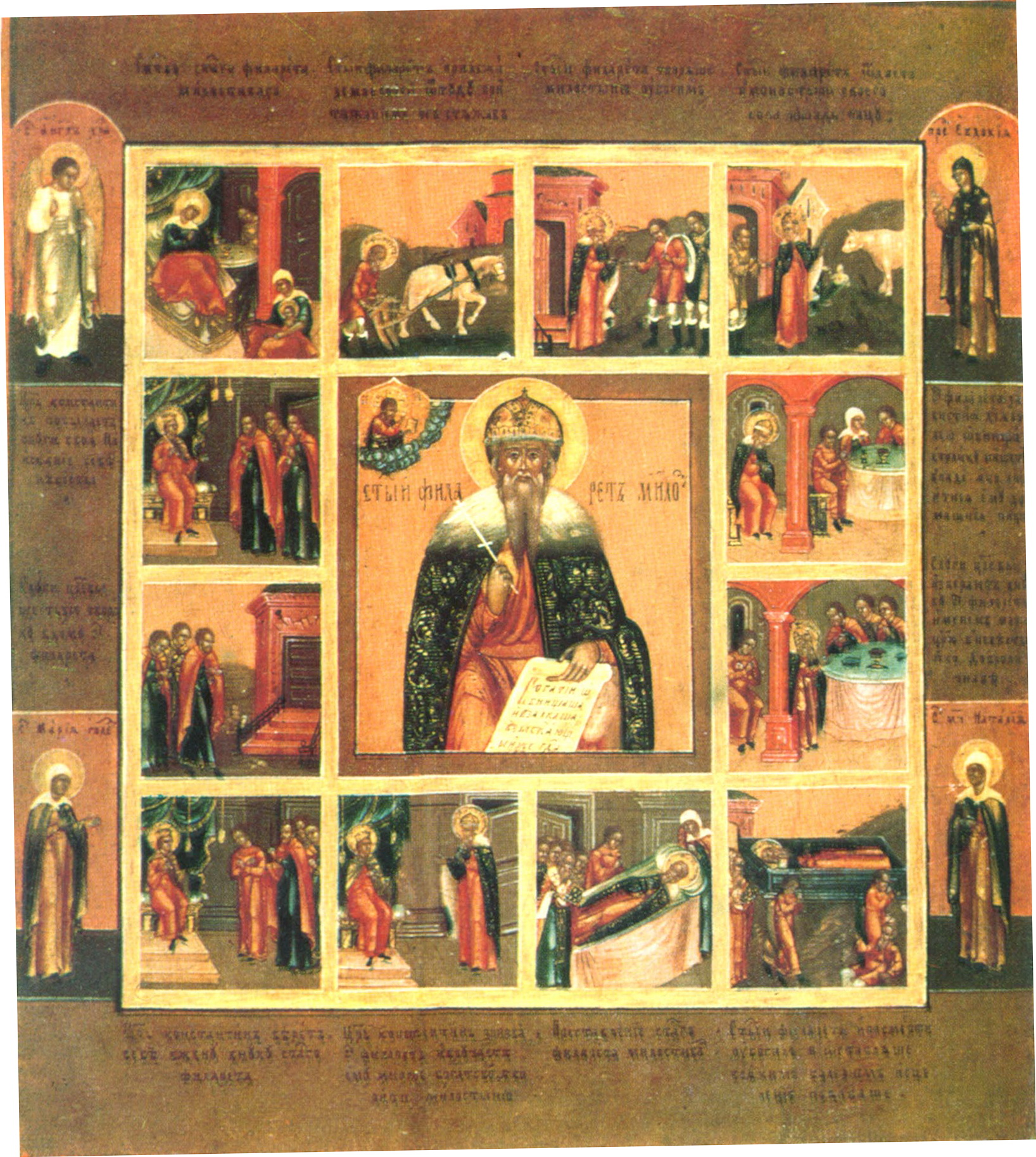
Righteous Philaret (Philaretos) the Merciful.

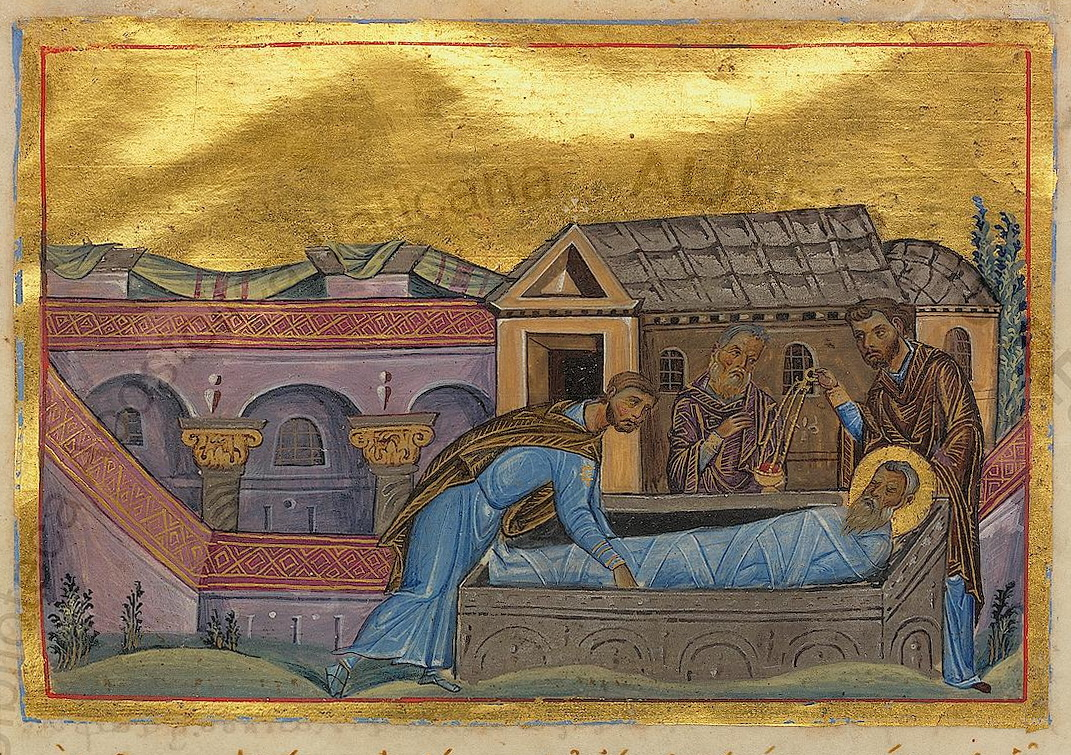
Repose of Righteous Philaret (Philaretos) the Merciful.
(Menologion of Basil II, 10th century).

St. Anastasia Șaguna, mother of Holy Hierarch Andrei Șaguna.

New Hieromartyr Innocent Letyaev, Archbishop of Kharkov and Akhtyra.

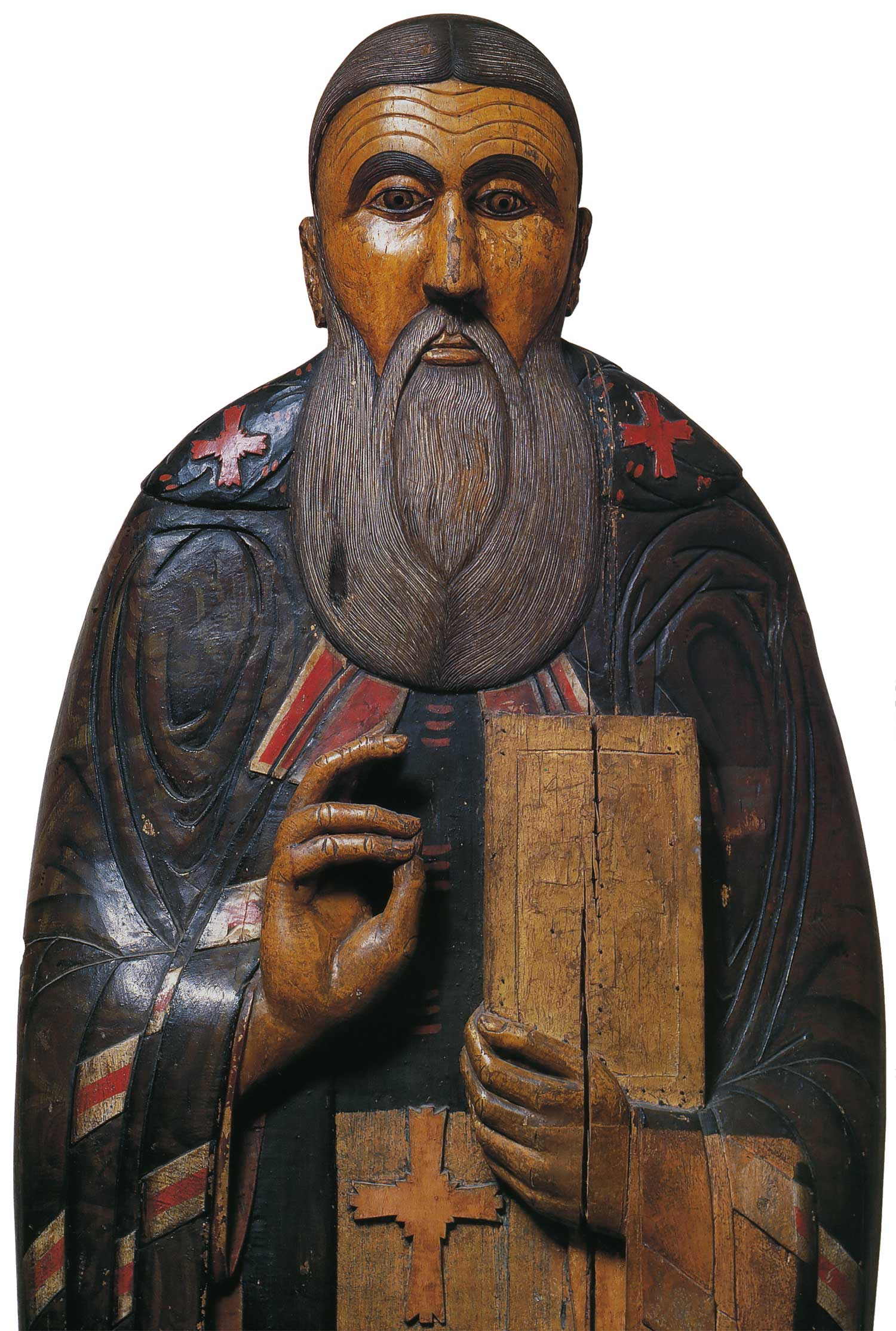
St. John (Elias, Ilya), Archbishop and Wonderworker of Novgorod.

== Sources ==
- December 1/14. Orthodox Calendar (PRAVOSLAVIE.RU).
- December 14 / December 1. HOLY TRINITY RUSSIAN ORTHODOX CHURCH (A parish of the Patriarchate of Moscow).
- December 1. OCA - The Lives of the Saints.
- December 1. Latin Saints of the Orthodox Patriarchate of Rome.
- The Roman Martyrology. Transl. by the Archbishop of Baltimore. Last Edition, According to the Copy Printed at Rome in 1914. Revised Edition, with the Imprimatur of His Eminence Cardinal Gibbons. Baltimore: John Murphy Company, 1916. pp. 370–371.
- Rev. Richard Stanton. A Menology of England and Wales, or, Brief Memorials of the Ancient British and English Saints Arranged According to the Calendar, Together with the Martyrs of the 16th and 17th Centuries. London: Burns & Oates, 1892. pp. 575–579.

Greek Sources

- Great Synaxaristes: 1 ΔΕΚΕΜΒΡΙΟΥ. ΜΕΓΑΣ ΣΥΝΑΞΑΡΙΣΤΗΣ.
- (in Greek) Συναξαριστής. 1 Δεκεμβρίου. ECCLESIA.GR. (H ΕΚΚΛΗΣΙΑ ΤΗΣ ΕΛΛΑΔΟΣ).

Russian Sources

- (in Russian) 14 декабря (1 декабря). Православная Энциклопедия под редакцией Патриарха Московского и всея Руси Кирилла (электронная версия). (Orthodox Encyclopedia - Pravenc.ru).
- (in Russian) 1 декабря (ст.ст.) 14 декабря 2014 (нов. ст.). Русская Православная Церковь Отдел внешних церковных связей. (DECR).
