= Staurakios Platys =

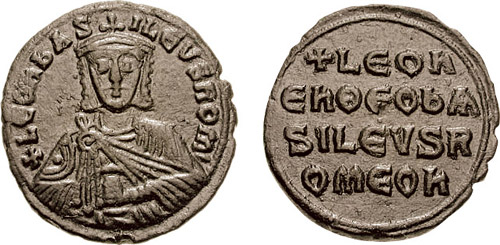

Staurakios Platys (Greek: Σταυράκιος ὁ Πλατύς) was a Byzantine officer who served as the katepano of the Mardaites in the Cibyrrhaeot Theme in ca. 910.

Staurakios Platys is only mentioned by the De Administrando Imperio, a work compiled in the middle of the 10th century by Constantine VII Porphyrogennetos. According to it, in approximately 909/910, he was the commander (katepano) of the Mardaites in the maritime Cibyrrhaeot Theme in southern Asia Minor. He clashed with Eustathios, the ek prosopou (or possibly the strategos) of the theme, over jurisdictional matters, although both were proteges of the powerful logothetes tou dromou, Himerios. Eustathios wrote to the emperor Leo VI the Wise with various accusations against Staurakios, and succeeded in having the latter recalled and his authority transferred to himself.

If he had not been dismissed by that time, it is possible that Staurakios is the nameless katepano of the Mardaites who was charged with providing crews and funds for Himerios' great naval expedition in 911, directed against the Emirate of Crete or the coasts of Syria. 5,087 Mardaites from the Cibyrrhaeot Theme were reportedly involved.

== Sources ==
- Lilie, Ralph-Johannes; Ludwig, Claudia; Pratsch, Thomas; Zielke, Beate (2013). Prosopographie der mittelbyzantinischen Zeit Online. Berlin-Brandenburgische Akademie der Wissenschaften. Nach Vorarbeiten F. Winkelmanns erstellt (in German). Berlin and Boston: De Gruyter.
