= November 30 (Eastern Orthodox liturgics) =

Day in the Eastern Orthodox liturgical calendar

Eastern Orthodox liturgical calendar
November 29	November 30	December 1
November 30 O.S. ≍ December 13 N.S. November 30 N.S ≍ November 17 O.S.

An Eastern Orthodox cross

November 30 in Eastern Orthodox liturgical calendars is a feast day and a day of commemoration of saints and martyrs. Although some Orthodox churches use the Revised Julian Calendar and others use the traditional Julian calendar, the fixed commemorations for their respective November 30 are broadly the same, no matter which calendar is used. (Note: Despite the dates being the same, the days to which they refer typically differ by 13 days. The notation Old Style or O.S. is sometimes used to indicate a date in the traditional Julian Calendar (the "Old Calendar"). The notation New Style or N.S. indicates a date in the Revised Julian calendar (the "New Calendar").)

== Saints ==
- Holy and All-Praised Apostle Andrew the First-Called (62) (Note: His major shrine is The Cathedral of Agios Andreas in Patras, Achaea, Greece. Name days celebrated today include: Andrew, Andreas (Ἀνδρέας); Adriana (Ἀνδριανή).) (Note: "AT Patras, in Achaia, the birthday of the apostle St. Andrew, who preached the gospel of Christ in Thrace and Scythia. Being apprehended by the proconsul Aegaeas, he was shut up in prison, severely scourged, and finally, being suspended on a cross, he lived two days on it, teaching the people. Having besought our Lord not to permit that he should be taken down from the cross, he was surrounded with a great brightness from heaven, and when the light disappeared he breathed his last.") (Note: St Andrew’s Cathedral in Kiev (Rastrelli) keeps the cross which he is said to have planted on the Kievan hills as he blessed them and foretold that the city would have many churches.)
- Saint Frumentius, Archbishop of Abyssinia (380)
- Saint Alexander, first Bishop of Methymna on Lesbos, Wonderworker, and member of the First Ecumenical Council (fl. 325)
- Saint Vakhtang I Gorgasali, King of Georgia (502)
- Saints Peter I and Samuel I, Catholicoi of Georgia (6th centuries) (Note: The Holy Synod of the Georgian Apostolic Orthodox Church canonized the holy catholicos Peter and the holy catholicos Samuel on October 17, 2002.)

== Pre-Schism Western saints ==
- Saints Castulus and Euprepis, martyrs in Rome
- Saint Constantius, a priest in Rome who opposed the Pelagians and at whose hands he suffered a great deal (5th century) (Note: "At Rome, St. Constantius, confessor, who strongly opposed the Pelagians, and by enduring many injuries from them, gained a place among holy confessors.")
- Saint Trojanus of Saintes (Troyen), a priest in Saintes in France where he later became bishop after St Vivien (533) (Note: "At Saintes, the holy bishop Trojanus, a man of great sanctity, who shows by many miracles that he lives in heaven, though buried on earth.")
- Saint Tudwal (Tugdual), monk from Wales who became Bishop of Tréguier, Brittany (c. 564) (Note: A monk from Wales who went to Brittany and became Bishop of Tréguier. Three places in the Lleyn peninsula in Gwynedd recall him and his relics are still honoured in Tréguier.) (see also: December 1)

== Post-Schism Orthodox saints ==
- Saint Andrew (Andrei) Șaguna, Metropolitan of Transylvania (1873)
- Saint Elias, Schemamonk of Valaam and Verkhoturye (1900)
- Venerable Archimandrite Sevastijan Dabović (Sebastian Dabovich) of San Francisco and Jackson, Enlightener and Apostle of the Church in America (1940) (Note: Canonized in 2015.) (see also: November 17 - O.S.)

=== New martyrs and confessors ===
- New Hieromartyr John Chestnov, Priest (1937)

== Other commemorations ==
- Entrance of the Apostle Andrew into Georgia (1st century)

== Icon gallery ==
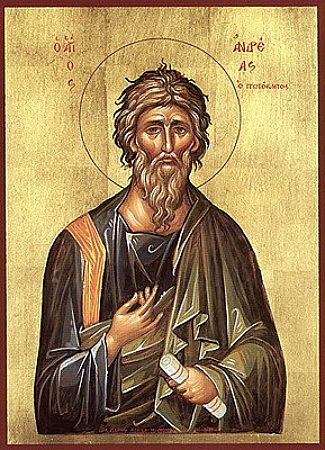
Holy and All-Praised Apostle Andrew the First-Called.

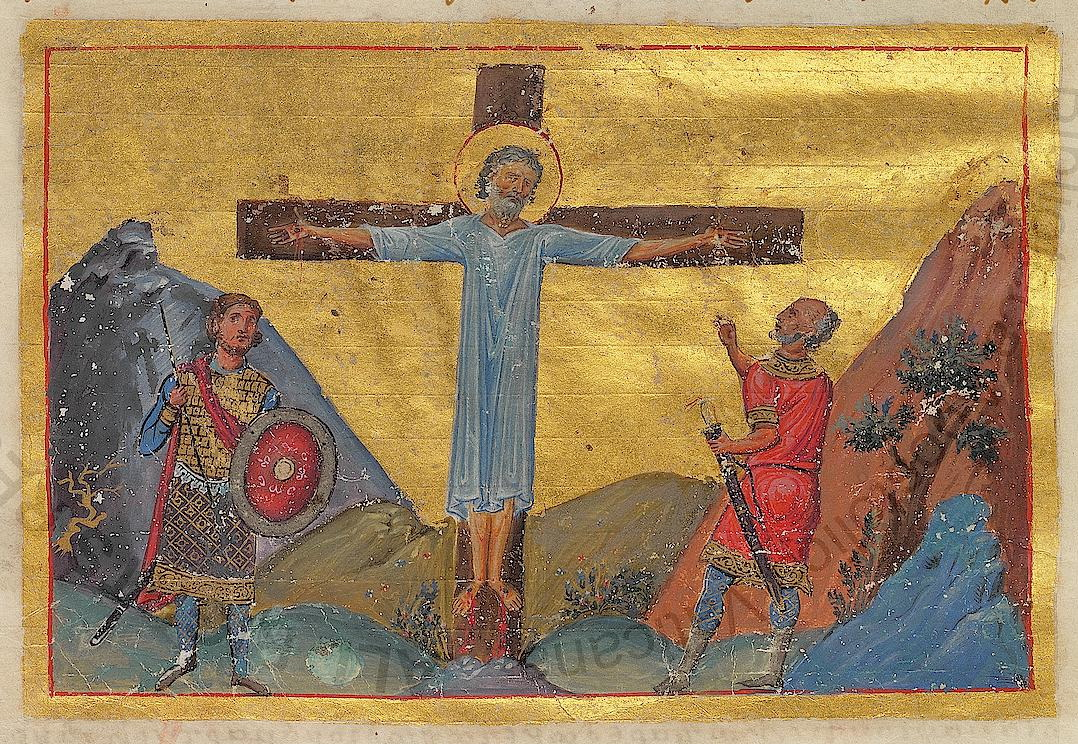
Martyrdom of the Holy and All-Praised Apostle Andrew the First-Called.
(Menologion of Basil II, 10th century).

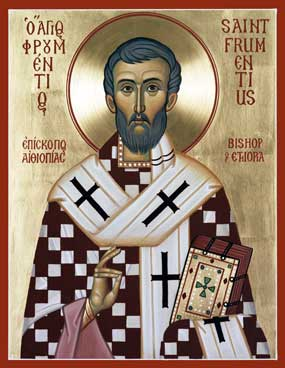
Saint Frumentius.

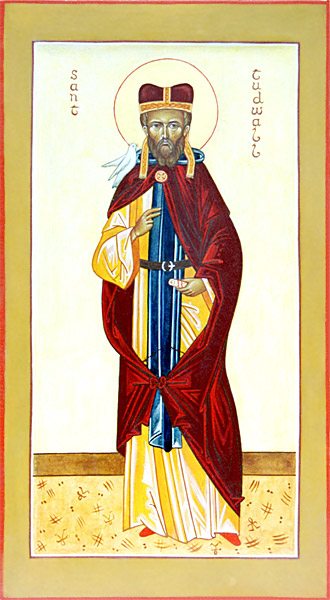
Saint Tudwal.

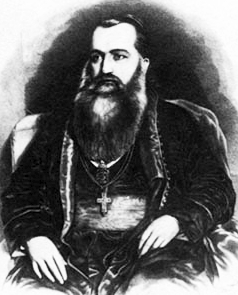
St. Andrei Șaguna.

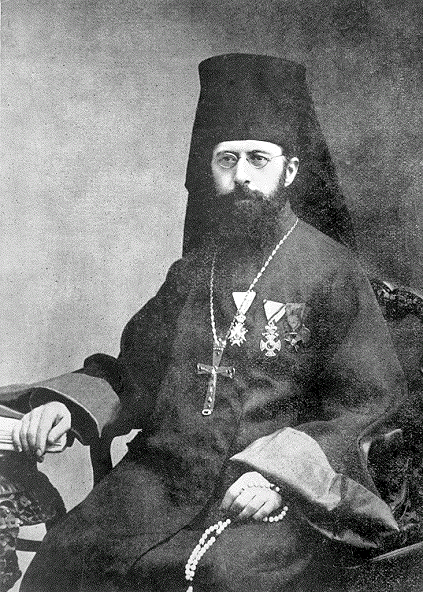
Venerable Archimandrite Sebastian (Dabovich) of San Francisco and Jackson.

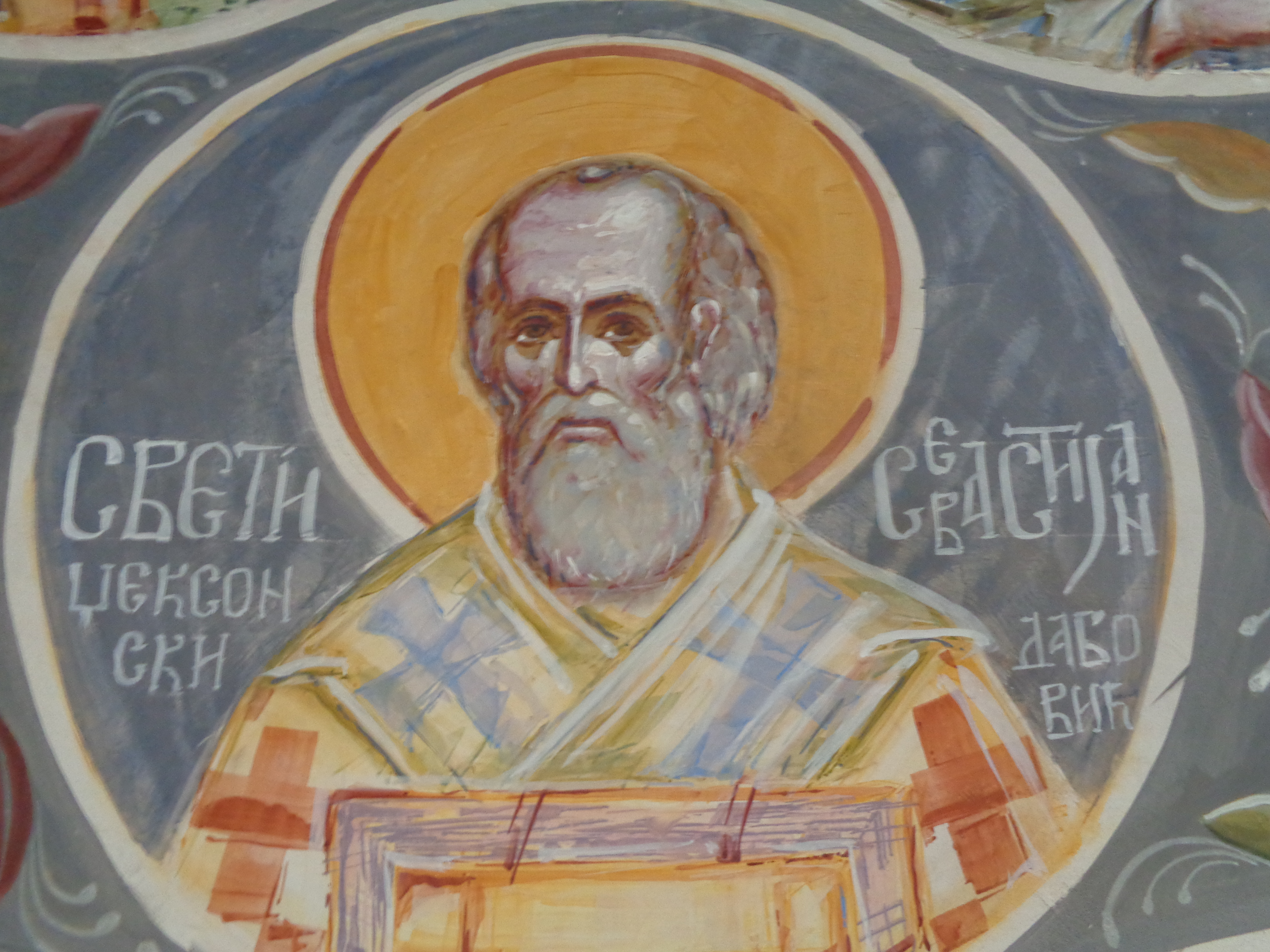
Venerable Archimandrite Sebastian (Dabovich) of San Francisco and Jackson.

== Sources ==
- November 30 / December 13. Orthodox Calendar (PRAVOSLAVIE.RU).
- December 13 / November 30. Holy Trinity Russian Orthodox Church (A parish of the Patriarchate of Moscow).
- November 30. OCA - The Lives of the Saints.
- The Autonomous Orthodox Metropolia of Western Europe and the Americas (ROCOR). St. Hilarion Calendar of Saints for the year of our Lord 2004. St. Hilarion Press (Austin, TX). p. 89.
- The Thirtieth Day of the Month of November. Orthodoxy in China.
- November 30. Latin Saints of the Orthodox Patriarchate of Rome.
- The Roman Martyrology. Transl. by the Archbishop of Baltimore. Last Edition, According to the Copy Printed at Rome in 1914. Revised Edition, with the Imprimatur of His Eminence Cardinal Gibbons. Baltimore: John Murphy Company, 1916. p. 369.
- Rev. Richard Stanton. A Menology of England and Wales, or, Brief Memorials of the Ancient British and English Saints Arranged According to the Calendar, Together with the Martyrs of the 16th and 17th Centuries. London: Burns & Oates, 1892. pp. 572-574.

Greek Sources

- Great Synaxaristes: (in Greek) 30 ΝΟΕΜΒΡΙΟΥ. ΜΕΓΑΣ ΣΥΝΑΞΑΡΙΣΤΗΣ.
- (in Greek) Συναξαριστής. 30 Νοεμβρίου. ECCLESIA.GR. (H ΕΚΚΛΗΣΙΑ ΤΗΣ ΕΛΛΑΔΟΣ).

Russian Sources

- (in Russian) 13 декабря (30 ноября). Православная Энциклопедия под редакцией Патриарха Московского и всея Руси Кирилла (электронная версия). (Orthodox Encyclopedia - Pravenc.ru).
- (in Russian) 30 ноября (ст.ст.) 13 декабря 2014 (нов. ст.). Русская Православная Церковь Отдел внешних церковных связей. (DECR).
- (in Russian) 30 ноября по старому стилю / 13 декабря по новому стилю. Русская Православная Церковь - Православный церковный календарь на 2018 год.
