= Niketas (son of Ioube) =

Byzantine governor

Niketas (Greek: Νικήτας), the son of Ioube, was a Byzantine officer of Arab origin who served as the governor (strategos) of the Cibyrrhaeot Theme in ca. 912.

Niketas is only mentioned by the De Administrando Imperio, a work compiled in the middle of the 10th century by Constantine VII Porphyrogennetos. According to it, he was the son of Ioube (Ἰούβη, a Hellenized form of Ayyub). Along with his older brother Chase (Hasan) he was a slave of the patrikios Damian, the parakoimomenos of Emperor Michael III, implying that they had been captured as prisoners of war during a conflict with the Arabs around the middle of the 9th century or shortly after. It is unclear whether they came alone or with their father; it is possible that they came to Byzantium as children, and that Niketas was even born there. Chase remained a Muslim in Byzantium, but Niketas, whose original Arab name is not recorded, was apparently baptized a Christian.

In 912 he was appointed by Emperor Alexander as the military governor (strategos) of the naval Cibyrrhaeot Theme, in succession to Eustathios. He requested from the emperor that his son, Aberkios, be appointed to the post of katepano of the Mardaites within the Cibyrrhaeot Theme. Emperor Alexander assented to this request.

The illoustrios John Ioubes later in the century was possibly a descendant or otherwise a relative.

== Sources ==
- Lilie, Ralph-Johannes; Ludwig, Claudia; Pratsch, Thomas; Zielke, Beate (2013). Prosopographie der mittelbyzantinischen Zeit Online. Berlin-Brandenburgische Akademie der Wissenschaften. Nach Vorarbeiten F. Winkelmanns erstellt (in German). Berlin and Boston: De Gruyter.
