= Antony the Younger =

Byzantine monk and saint (785–865)

Saint Antony the Younger
- Born: 785; Phossaton near Jerusalem, Jund Filastin (modern-day Israel)
- Died: 11 November 865 (aged 79–80); Constantinople, Byzantine Empire (modern-day Istanbul, Turkey)
- Venerated in: Eastern Orthodox Church
- Feast: Eastern Orthodox: 1 December

Saint Antony the Younger (Greek: Ἀντώνιος ὁ Νέος; 785 – 11 November 865) was a Byzantine military officer who became a monk and saint. He is commemorated by the Eastern Orthodox Church on 1 December.

== Biography ==
Saint Antony was born John Echimos (Ἰωάννης Ἔχιμος) at Phossaton near Jerusalem in 785. His parents were Photeinos and Irene, and he had at least a brother named David and a sister named Theodoule.

According to his hagiography, as a child he was brought to the hermit John, who foretold his future. When his mother died in c. 800, he and his siblings left Palestine for Attaleia. There he entered imperial service, probably in the Byzantine navy. In 821 or 822 he was promoted to ek prosopou (deputy governor) of the Cibyrrhaeot Theme. He held the post until 825, although he may have been promoted to thematic governor (strategos) in the meantime. He participated in the suppression of the rebellion of Thomas the Slav in 822–823, then spent ten months in Constantinople in 823–824, before returning to his theme and leading the repulsion of an Arab attack on either Attaleia or Syllaion.

In 825, just as he was about to be married, he was secretly tonsured by the stylite monk Eustratios, and adopted the monastic name Antony. Joined by his servant Theodore, he spent some time at Amorion, before moving on to Pylae and Nicaea, and thence to the Agauron or Pandemos Monastery on the Bithynian Olympus. His hagiography claims that during these journeys he was repeatedly rescued from need in miraculous manner. In 829 or 830 he was tried on the orders of Emperor Theophilos by the epi ton deeseon Stephen for his persecution of Thomas the Slav's adherents after the end of his rebellion, and was imprisoned for five months at Constantinople. After being whipped, he was released, and returned to Agauron. Sometime later (Raymond Janin places this between 837 and 843) he went to Briles, where he lived in a chapel dedicated to Saint Panteleimon. He then spent some time in the Monastery of Heraclius at Kios, returned to Agauron until 842, and then went again to the Monastery of Heraclius until 848, when he moved to the metochion of All Saints in Constantinople.

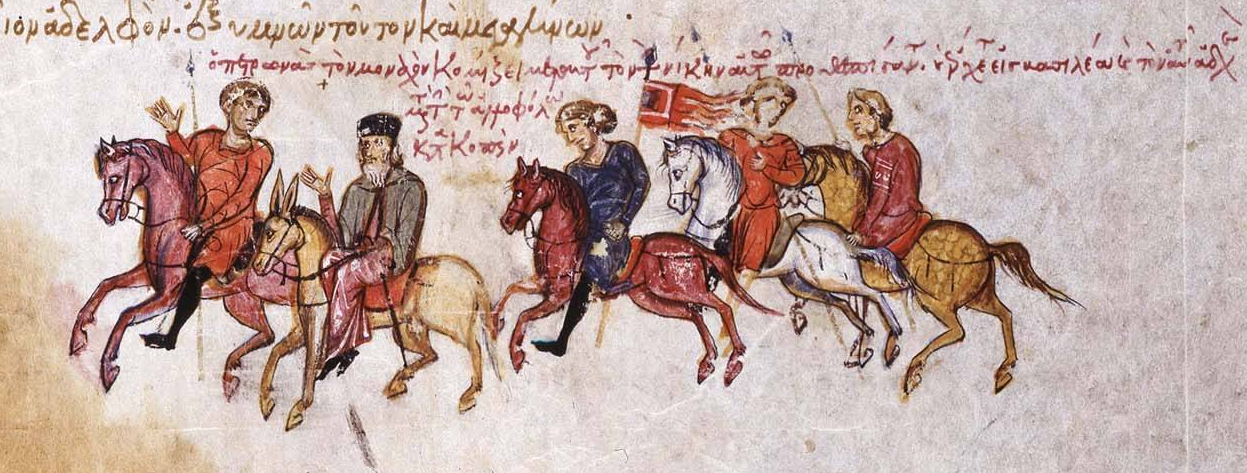
Petronas (far left) with the monk who foretold his victory at Lalakaon, here called "John of Mount Latros". Miniature from the Madrid Skylitzes

In c. 855 he cured Petronas, the uncle of Emperor Michael III, who became his disciple. The two had a very close relationship, and Antony is said to have prophesied Petronas' great victory over the Arabs in 863 at the Battle of Lalakaon. In that year, he moved to Ephesus, before returning to Constantinople in 865, spending the final days until his death on 11 November in the Monastery of Leo the Deacon.

He is commemorated by the Eastern Orthodox Church on 11 November and 1 December.

== Hagiography ==
His hagiography was a disciple who visited Antony shortly before the latter's death. Preserved in several manuscripts, is a valuable historical source as it is "rich in information about Byzantine medical services, every-day life, law, and the administrative system" (A. Kazhdan).

== Sources ==
- Kazhdan, Alexander, ed. (1991). The Oxford Dictionary of Byzantium. Oxford and New York: Oxford University Press. ISBN 0-19-504652-8.
- Kazhdan, Alexander; Talbot, Alice-Mary; Alexakis, Alexander; Efthymiadis, Stephanos; McGrath, Stamatina; Sherry, Lee Francis; Zielke, Beate, eds. (1998). Dumbarton Oaks Hagiography Database of the Eighth, Ninth and Tenth Century (PDF). Washington, DC: Dumbarton Oaks.
- Lilie, Ralph-Johannes; Ludwig, Claudia; Pratsch, Thomas; Zielke, Beate (2013). Prosopographie der mittelbyzantinischen Zeit Online. Berlin-Brandenburgische Akademie der Wissenschaften. Nach Vorarbeiten F. Winkelmanns erstellt (in German). Berlin and Boston: De Gruyter.
