= Sillyon =

Archaeological site in Turkey

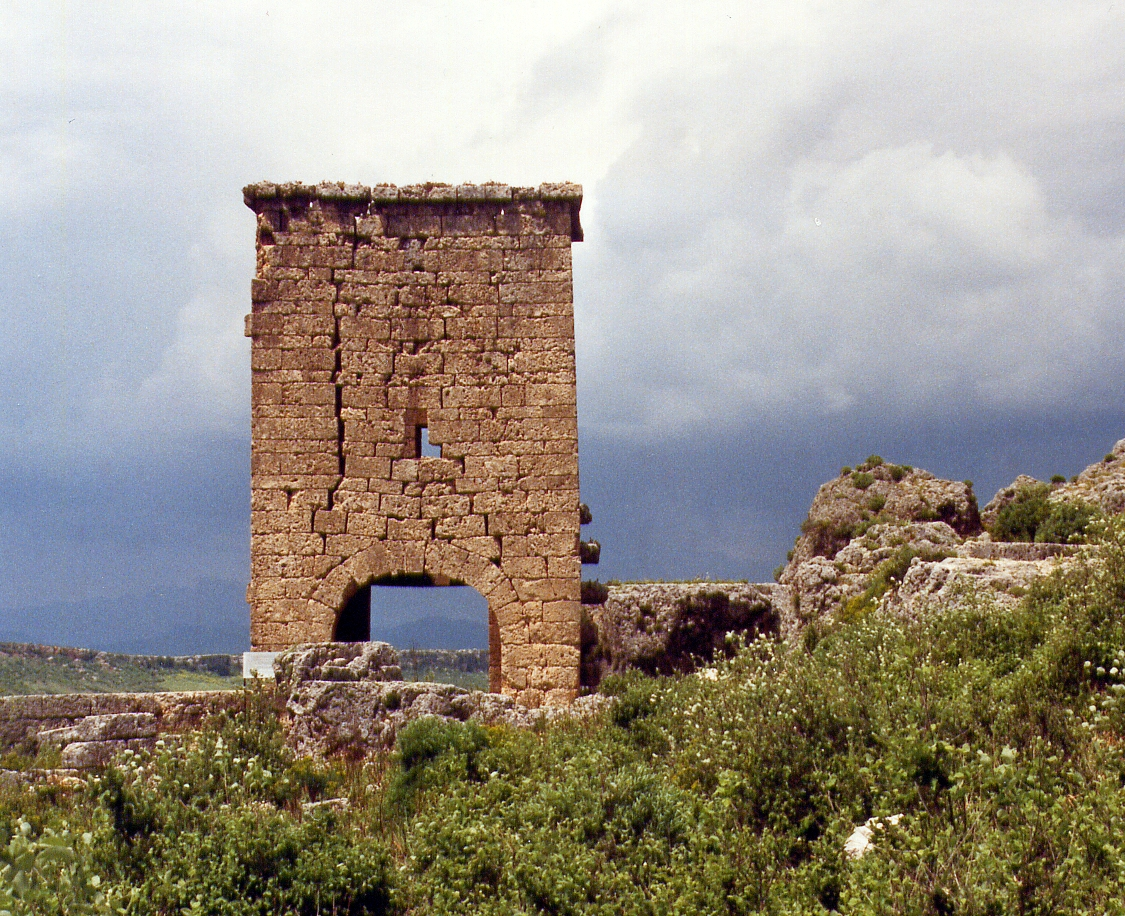
- City gates at Sillyon

- Location within Turkey
- 36°59′33″N 30°59′23″E
- Type: Settlement
- Location: Antalya Province, Turkey
- Region: Pamphylia

Site notes
- Condition: In ruins

Sillyon (Greek: Σύλλιον; in Stephanus of Byzantium Σύλειον, Σύλαιον, Σύλλον and Σίλονον), in Byzantine times called Syllaeum or Syllaion (Συλλαῖον), was an important fortress and city near Attaleia in Pamphylia, on the southern coast of modern Turkey. The native Greco-Pamphylian form was Selywiys, possibly deriving from the original Hittite Sallawassi. Its modern Turkish names are Yanköy Hisarı or Asar Köy.

== Antiquity ==
Throughout Antiquity, the city was relatively unimportant. According to one legend, the city was founded as a colony from Argos, while another holds that it was founded, along with Side and Aspendos, by the seers Mopsos, Calchas and Amphilochus after the Trojan War. The city is first mentioned in c. 500 BC by Pseudo-Scylax (polis Sylleion). From 469 BC, the city (as Sillyon) became part of the Athenian-led Delian League. It is mentioned in the Athenian tribute lists in c. 450 BC and again in 425 BC, and then disappears again from the historical record until 333 BC, when Alexander the Great is said to have unsuccessfully besieged it. According to Arrian (Anabasis Alexandri I. 26), the site (recorded as Syllion) was well-fortified and had a strong garrison of mercenaries and "native barbarians", so that Alexander, pressed for time, had to abandon the siege after the first attempt at storming it failed.

The city was extensively rebuilt under the Seleucids, especially its theatre. In later times, when most of western Asia Minor fell to the Attalid kingdom, Sillyon remained a free city by a decision of the Roman Senate.

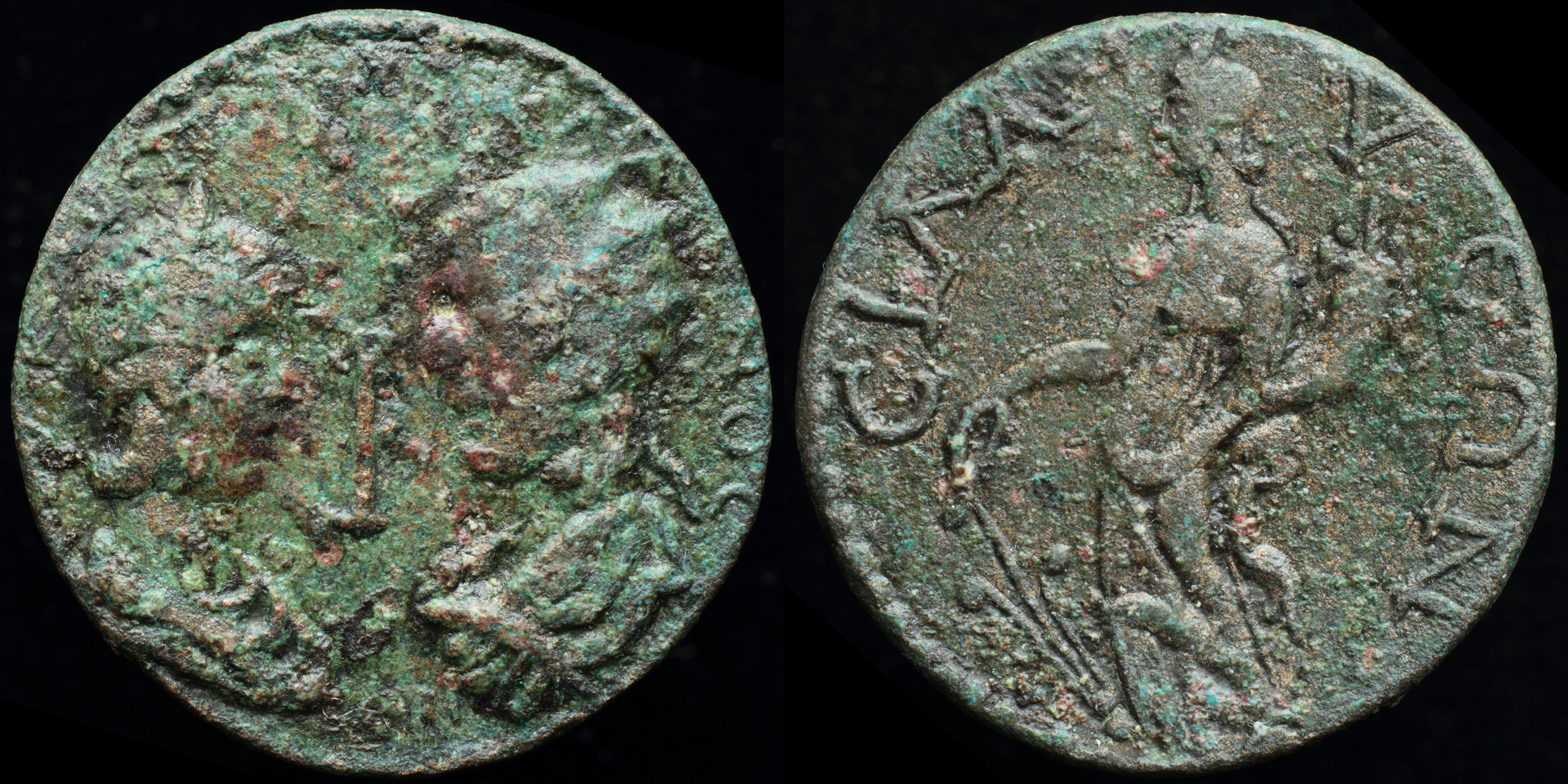

First side of the image: O: radiate bust of Gallienus confronting bust of Salonina AV K ΠO ΛI ΓAΛΛIHNOC
Second side of the image: R: Tyche holding rudder and cornucopia CIΛΛVEΩN
Bronze coin struck by Gallienus in Sillyon 254-268 AD.

=== Numismatics ===
The city has an attested continuous tradition of minting its own coins from the early 3rd century BC up to the reign of the Roman emperor Aurelian in the 270s. Silver tetradrachms of the Alexandrian and Lysimachian types were minted between 281 and 190 BC, but other than that, the city's coinage is in bronze. 3rd-century BC coins feature a bearded head or a standing figure, possibly identifiable with Apollo, or lightning and the inscription ΣΕΛΥИΙΥΣ (the native Pamphylian name, where И=/w/). Coinage under Roman suzerainty featured the same motifs, but with the inscription hellenized to ϹΙΛΛΥΕΩΝ ("of the Sillyeans"). Epiphania was a city in Cilicia Secunda (Cilicia Trachea), in Anatolia.

== Byzantine period ==
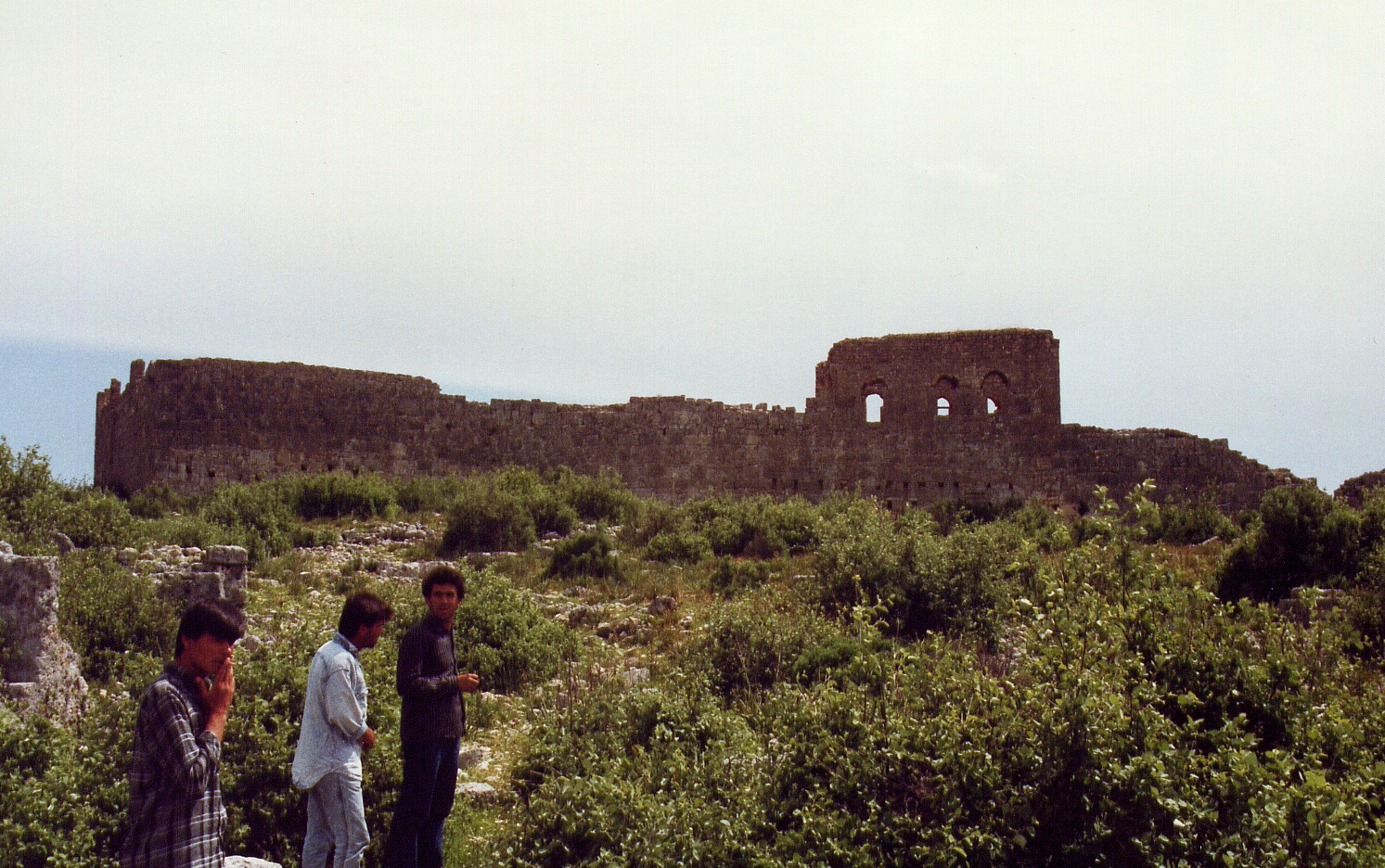
Remains of a Byzantine-era structure on the acropolis of Syllaion

Under the Byzantine Empire, the city rose to relative prominence. It is mentioned as the site of the destruction of an Arab fleet by storm in late 677 or 678, following the unsuccessful Arab Siege of Constantinople. As one of the major fortified sites of the area, it became the seat of an imperial representative (ek prosōpou), complementing the stratēgos of the naval theme of the Kibyrrhaiotai. Syllaeum was also located at the start of the great public road that linked the southern coast, via Amorium and Nicaea, with Bithynia and the capital Constantinople. In this position, it began to eclipse the traditional local metropolis of Perge, and sometime between 787 and 815, the local bishop's seat was transferred to Syllaeum. Together with the wider area of Pamphylia, the city fell to the Seljuks in 1207. After its decline, its metropolis was assumed by Side around 1315.

== Notable people ==
- Saint Antony the Younger was ek prosōpou at Syllaion in c. 821-29.
- Patriarch Constantine II of Constantinople was bishop of the city.
- Patriarch Antony I of Constantinople was born in the city.

== Archaeological remains ==
The ruins of Sillyon/Syllaion date from the Hellenistic, Roman, Byzantine and partly Seljuk eras. Among these are remains of city gates, a stadium, an amphitheatre and an odeon (some of which have tumbled because of a landslide), a temple, a cistern and a gymnasium. Much of it is threatened by landslide, since the city is located atop a rocky plateau.

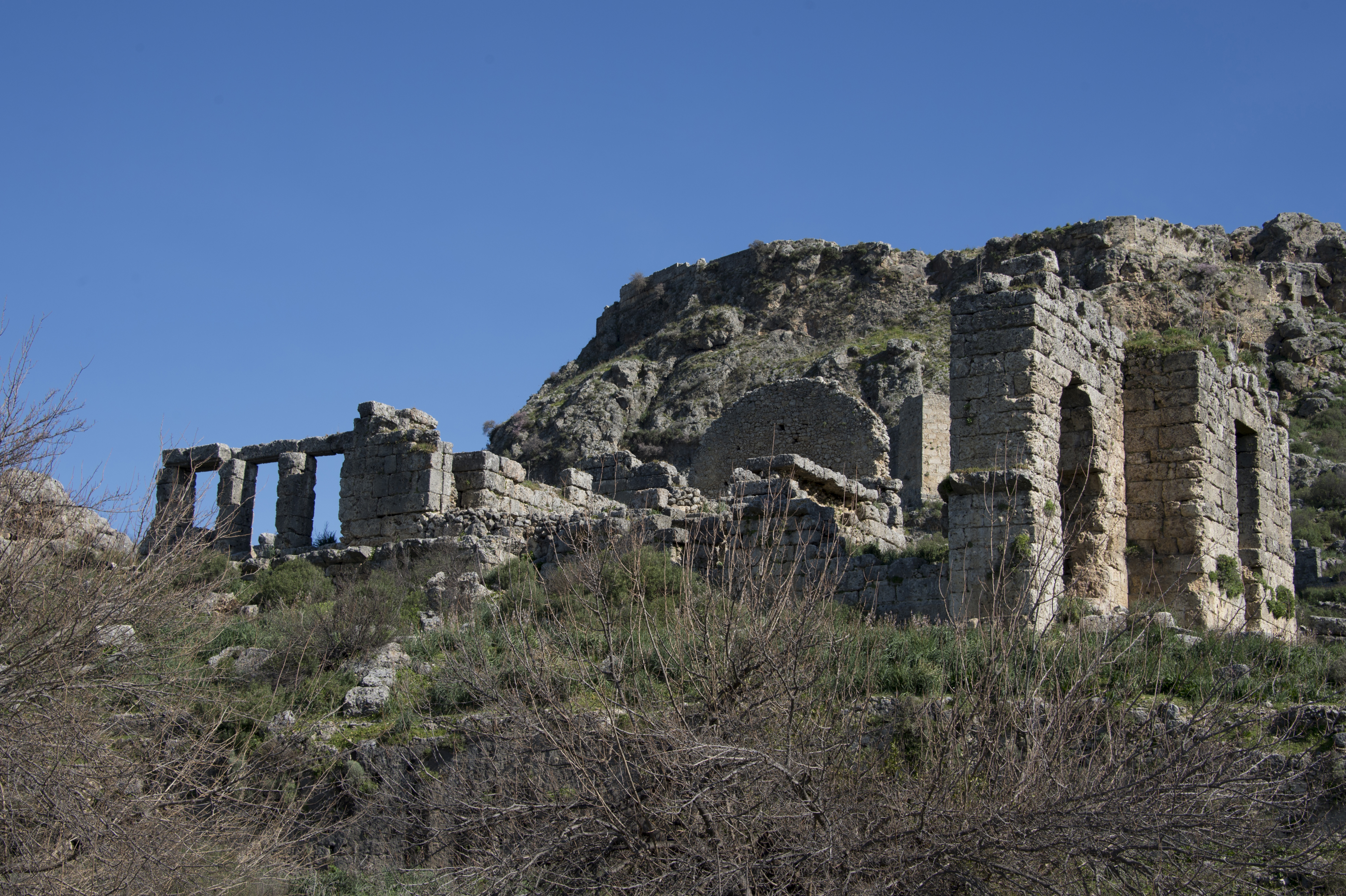
Ancient palace

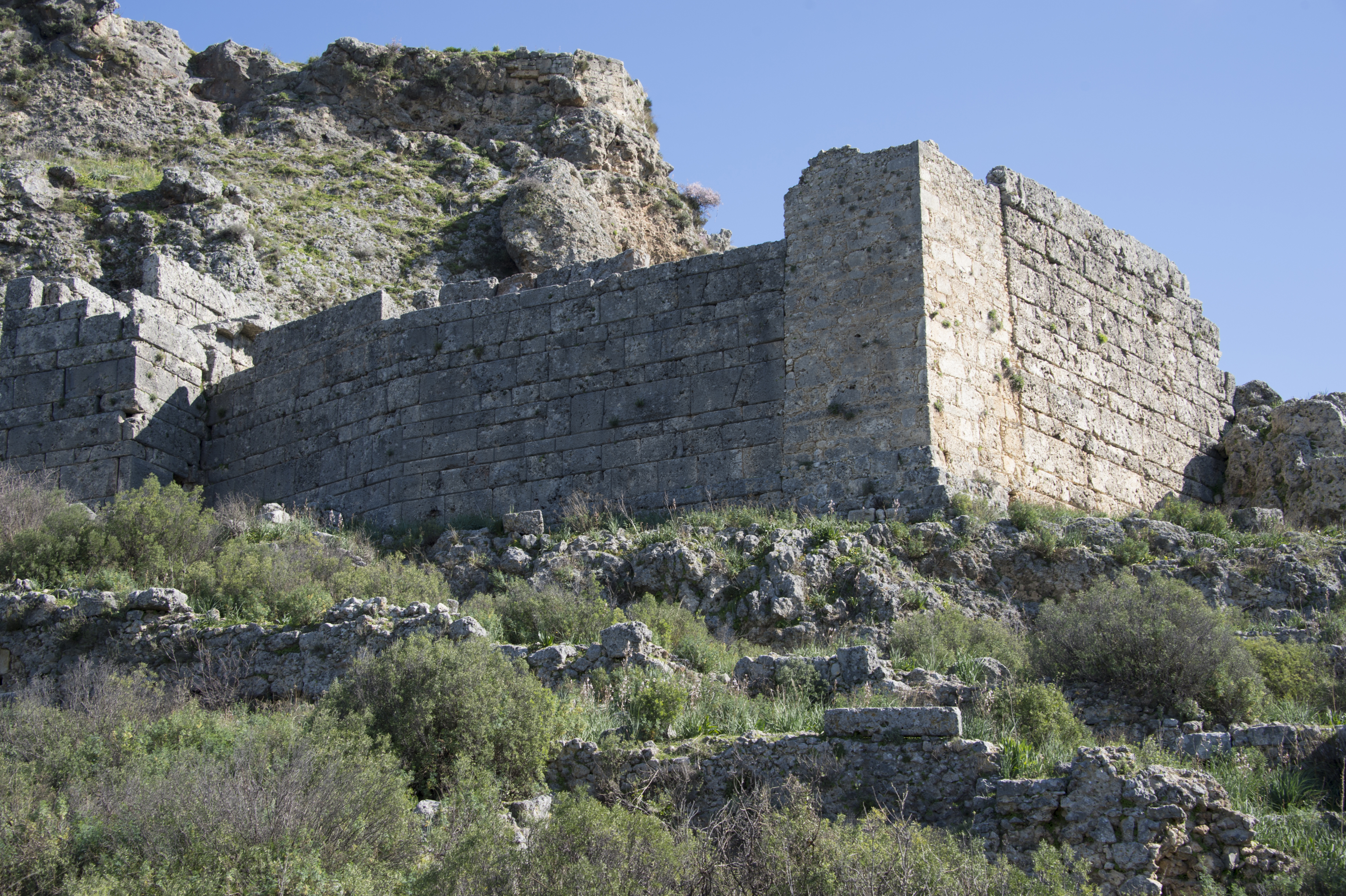
Bastion

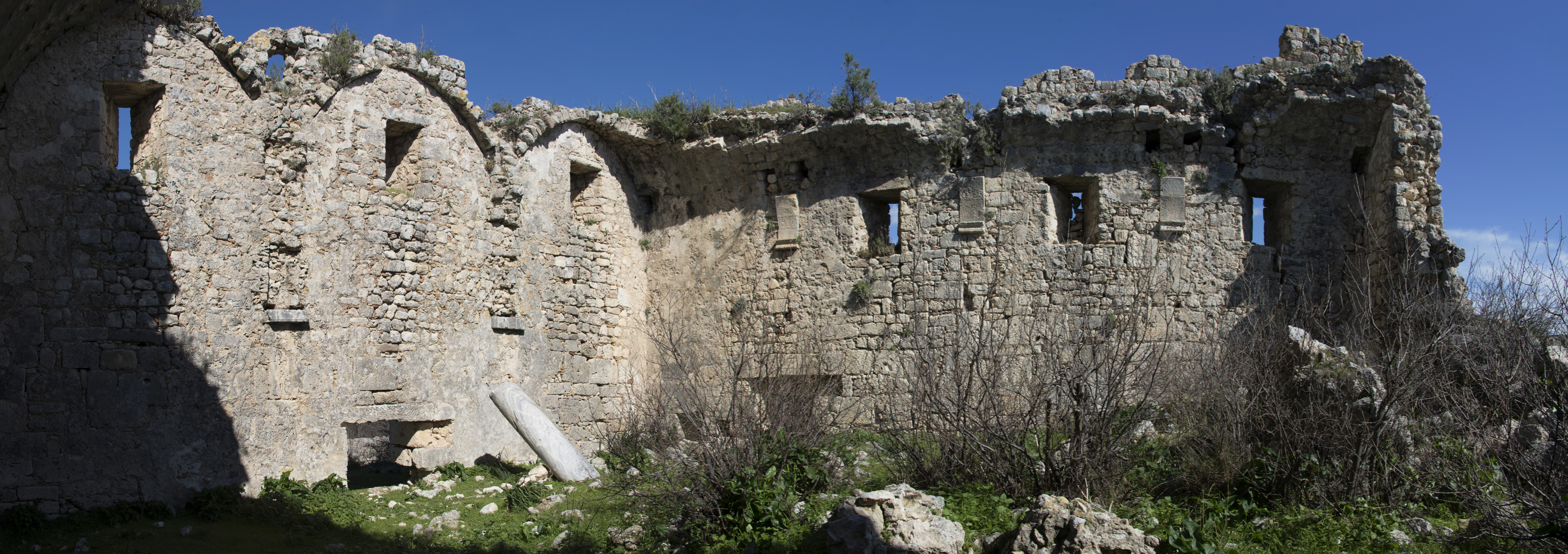
Byzantine building

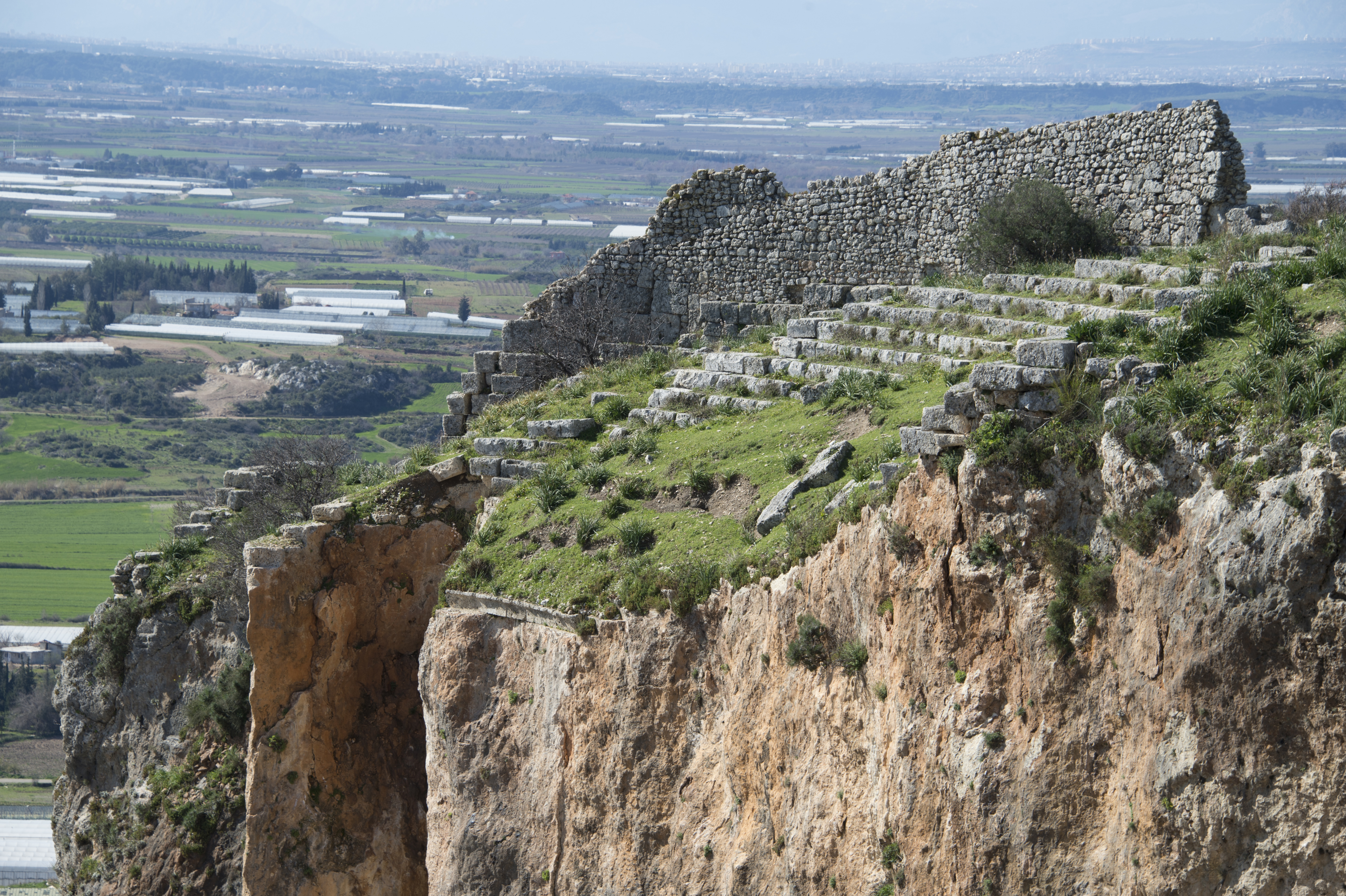
Collapsed theatre and odeion

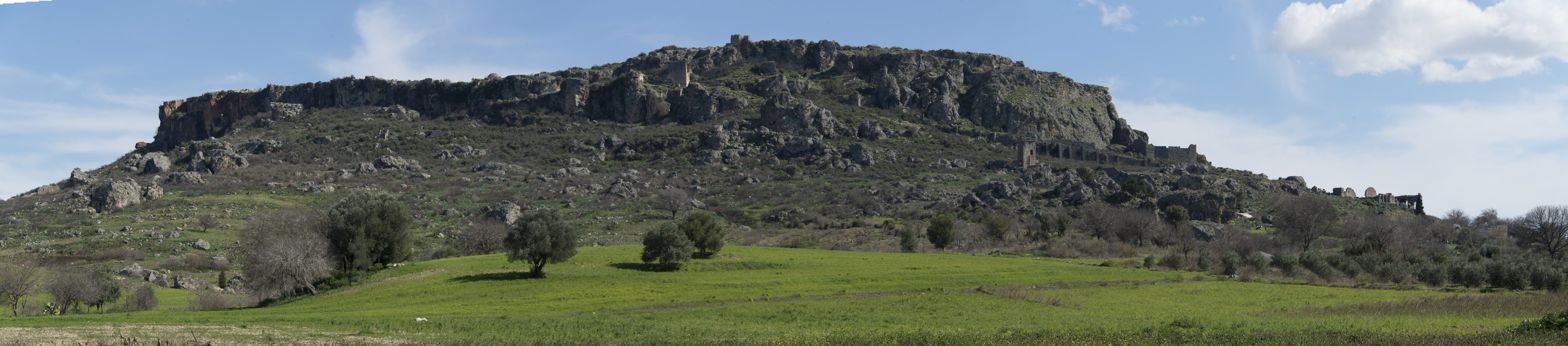
View from below hill

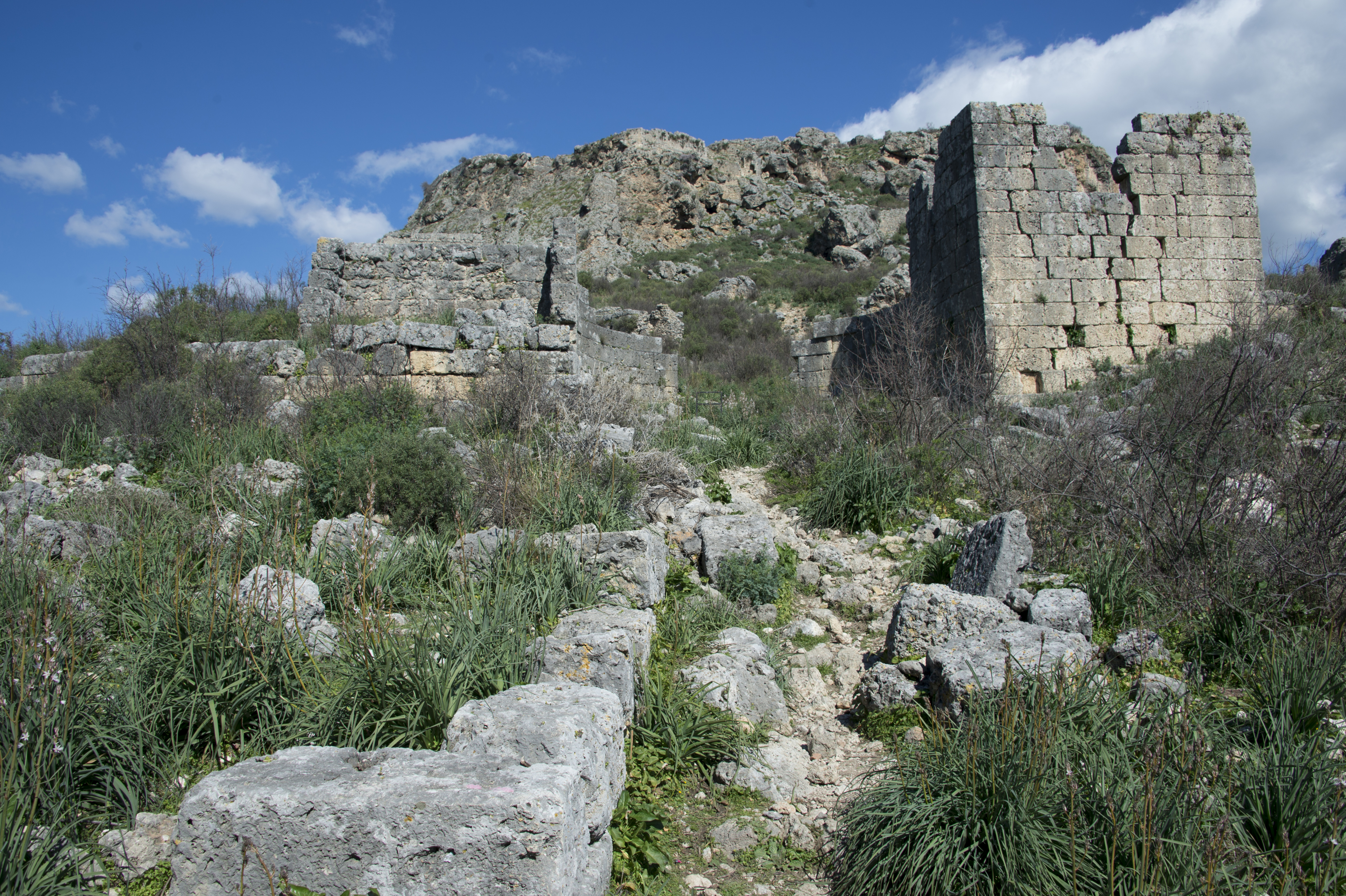
Gate

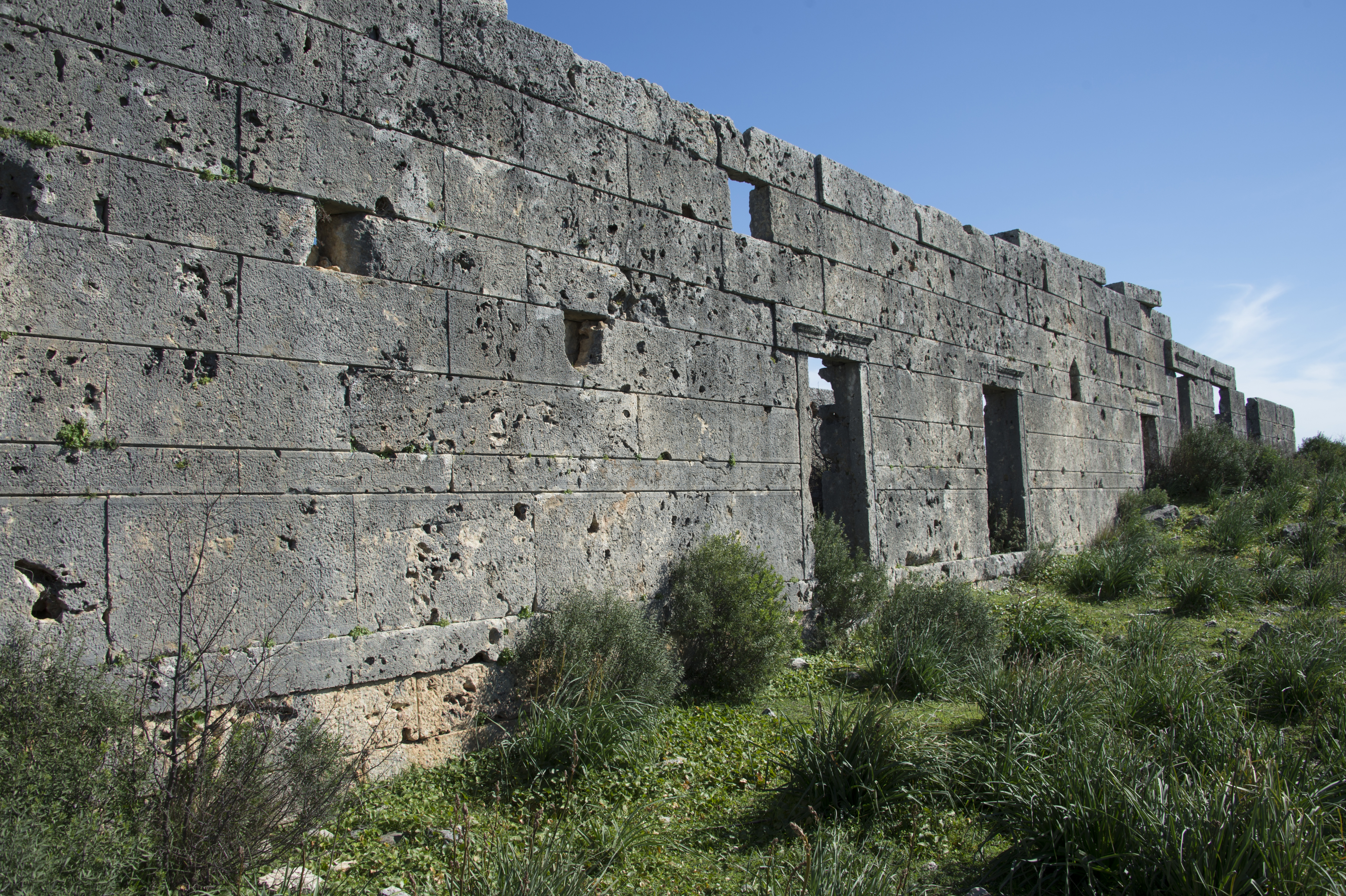
Hellenist building

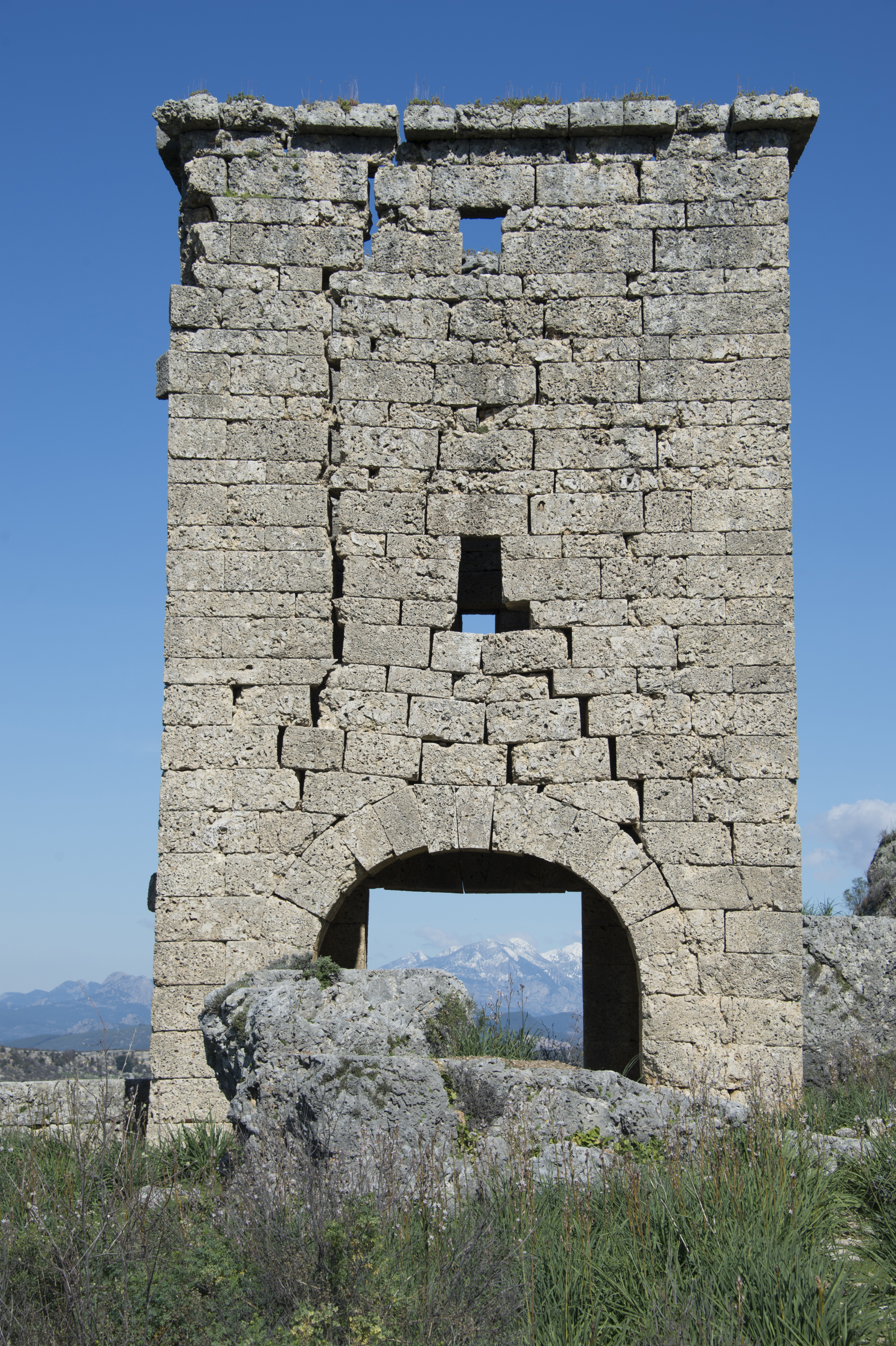
Gate tower

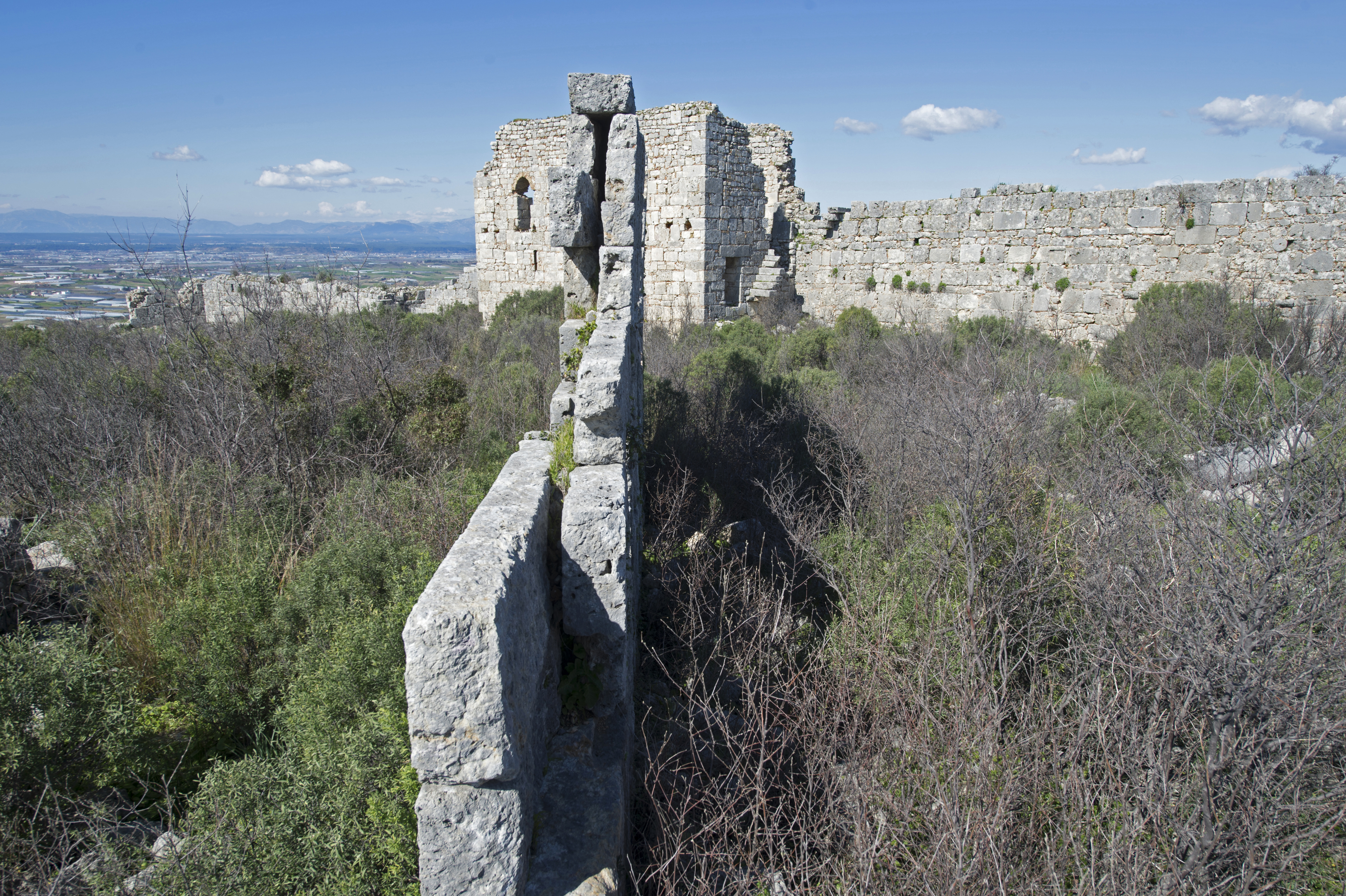
Medieval castle

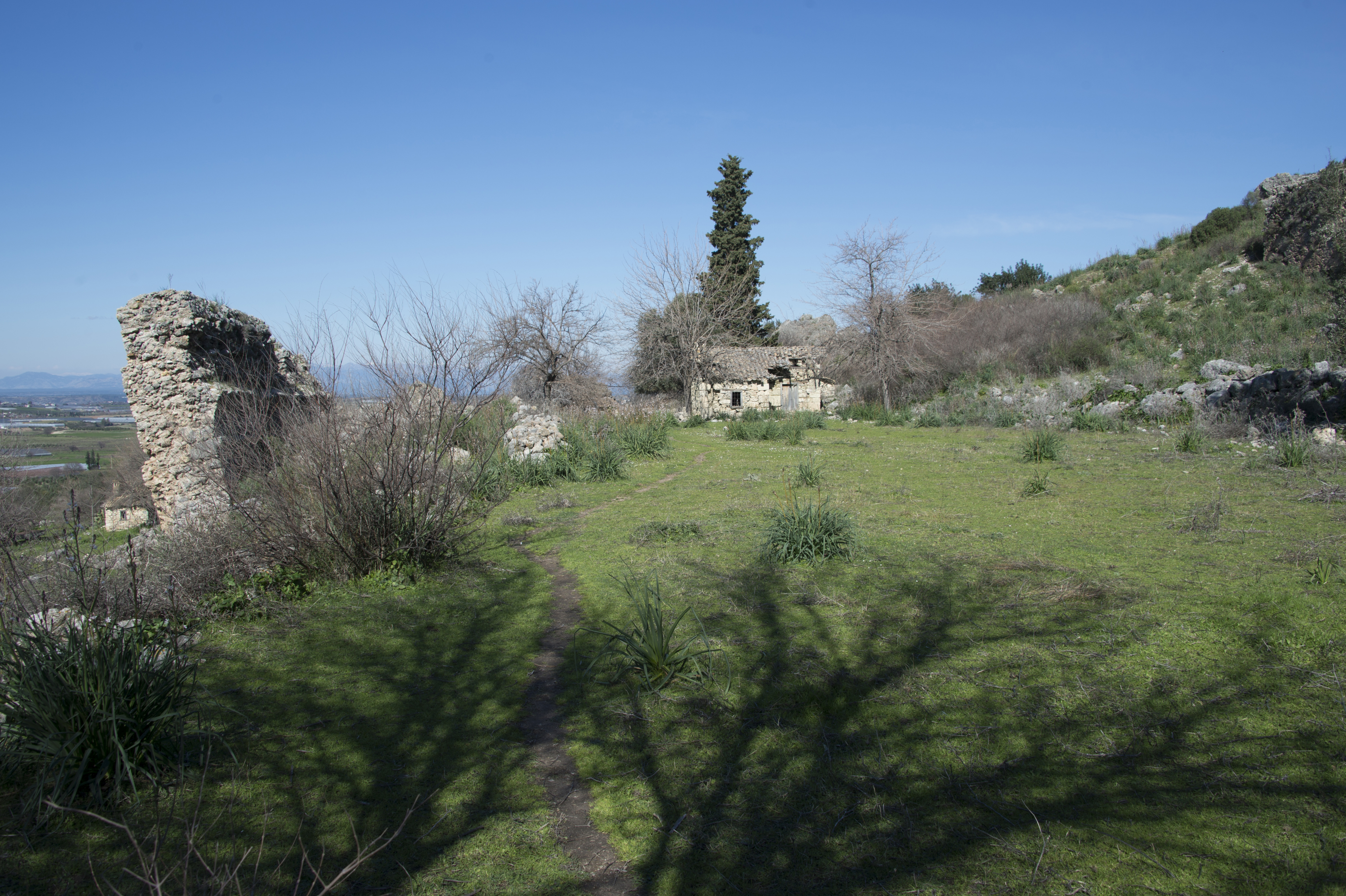
Stadium

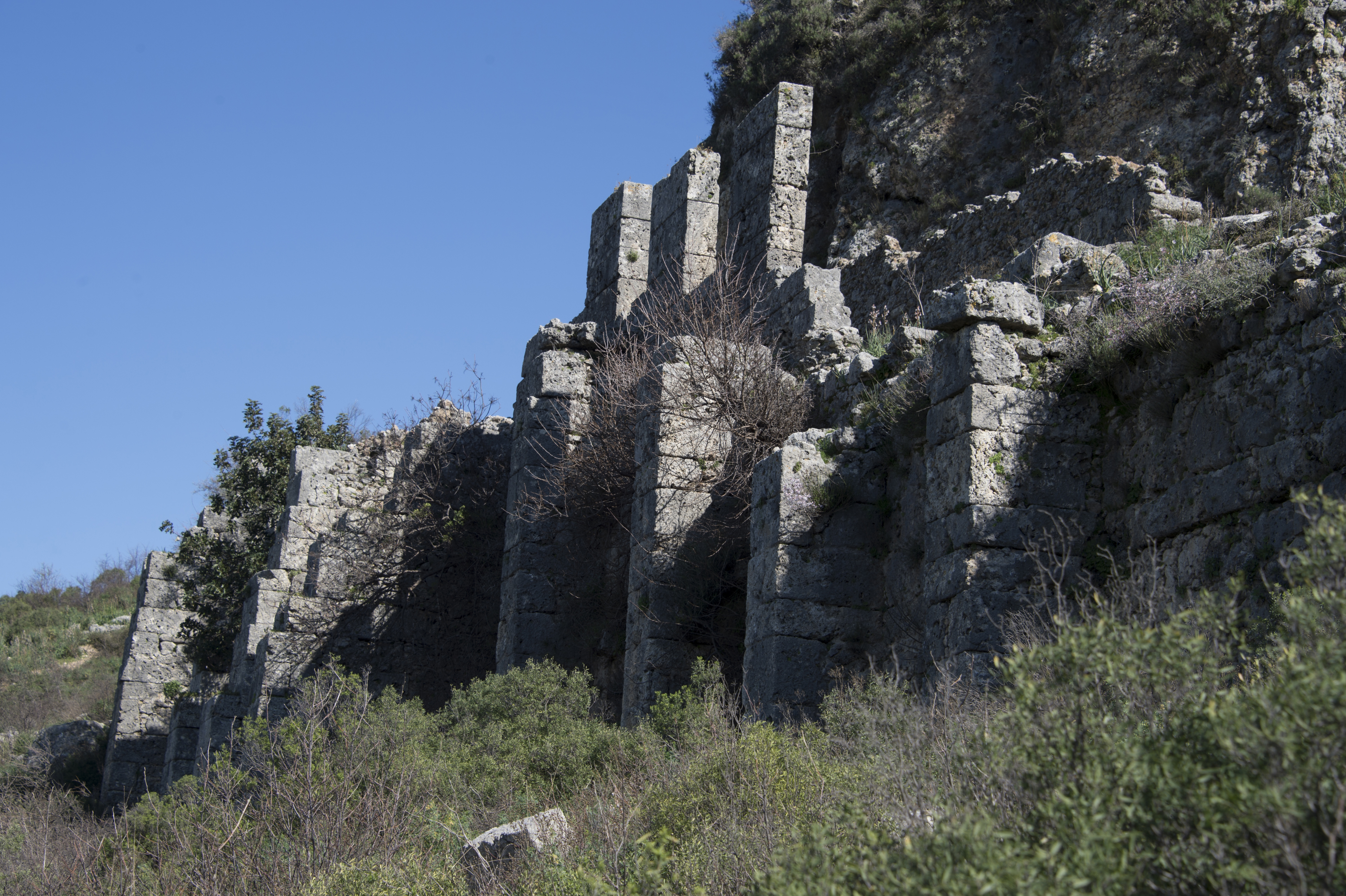
Wall

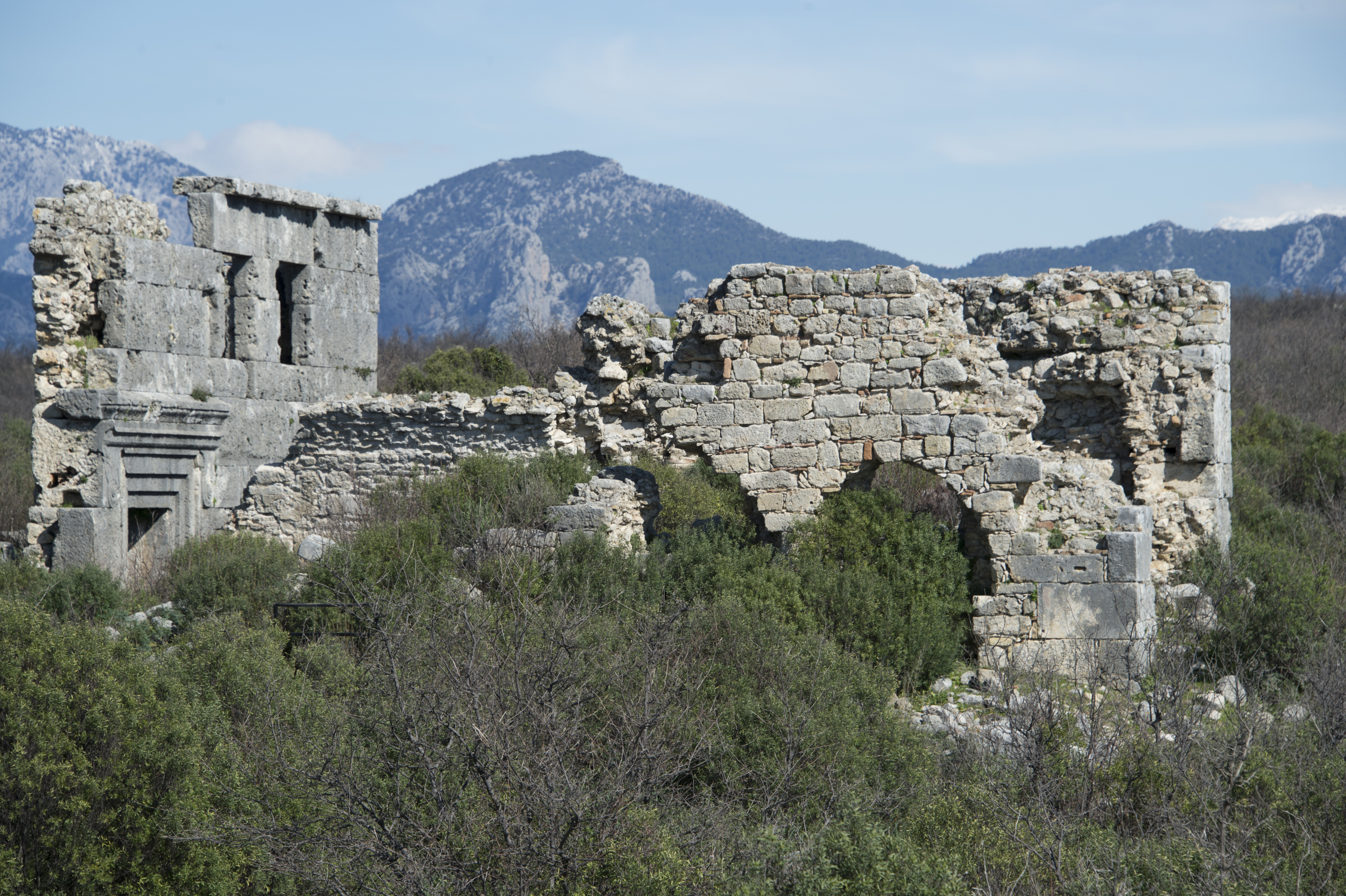
Small church

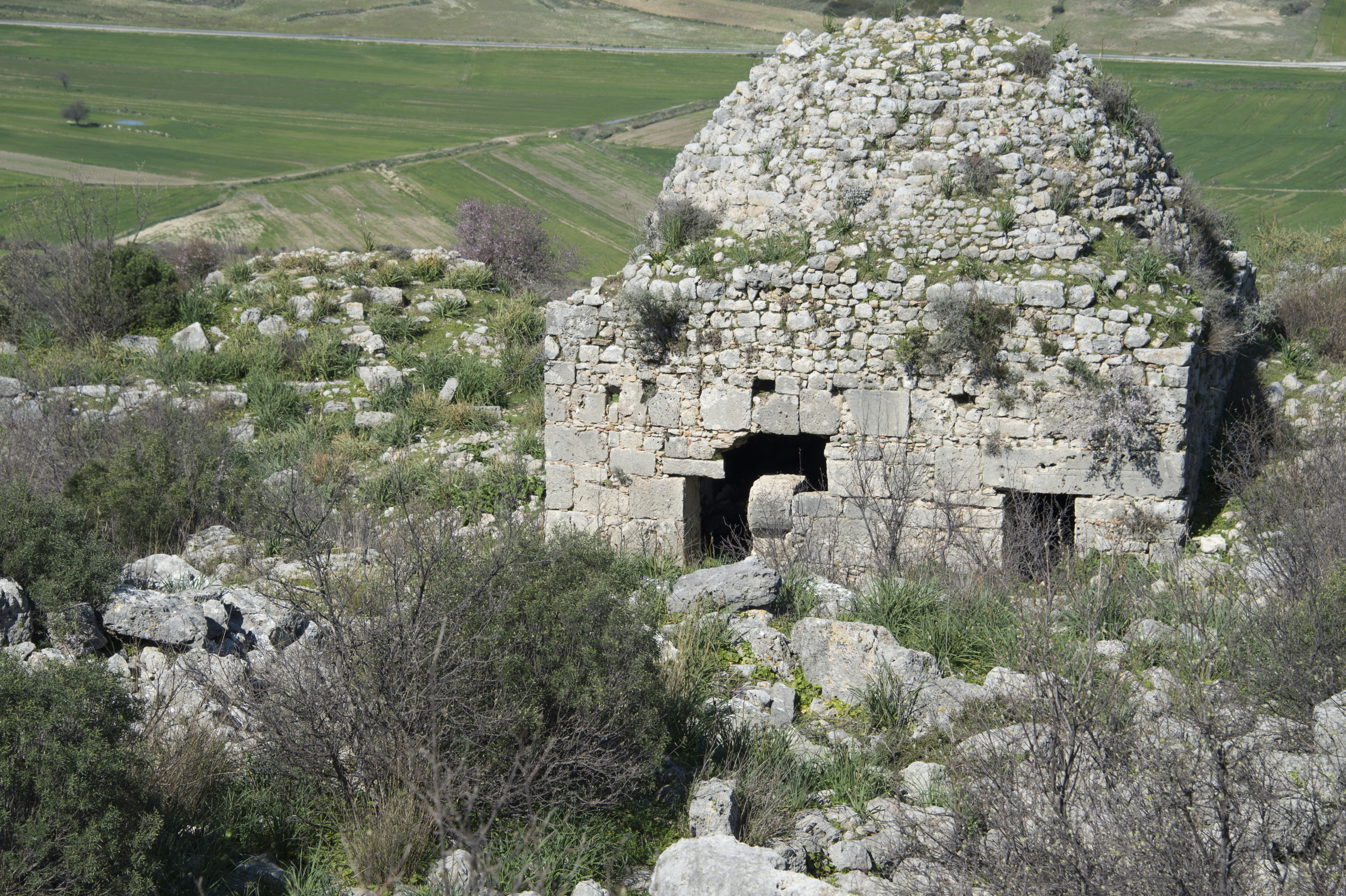
Mescit

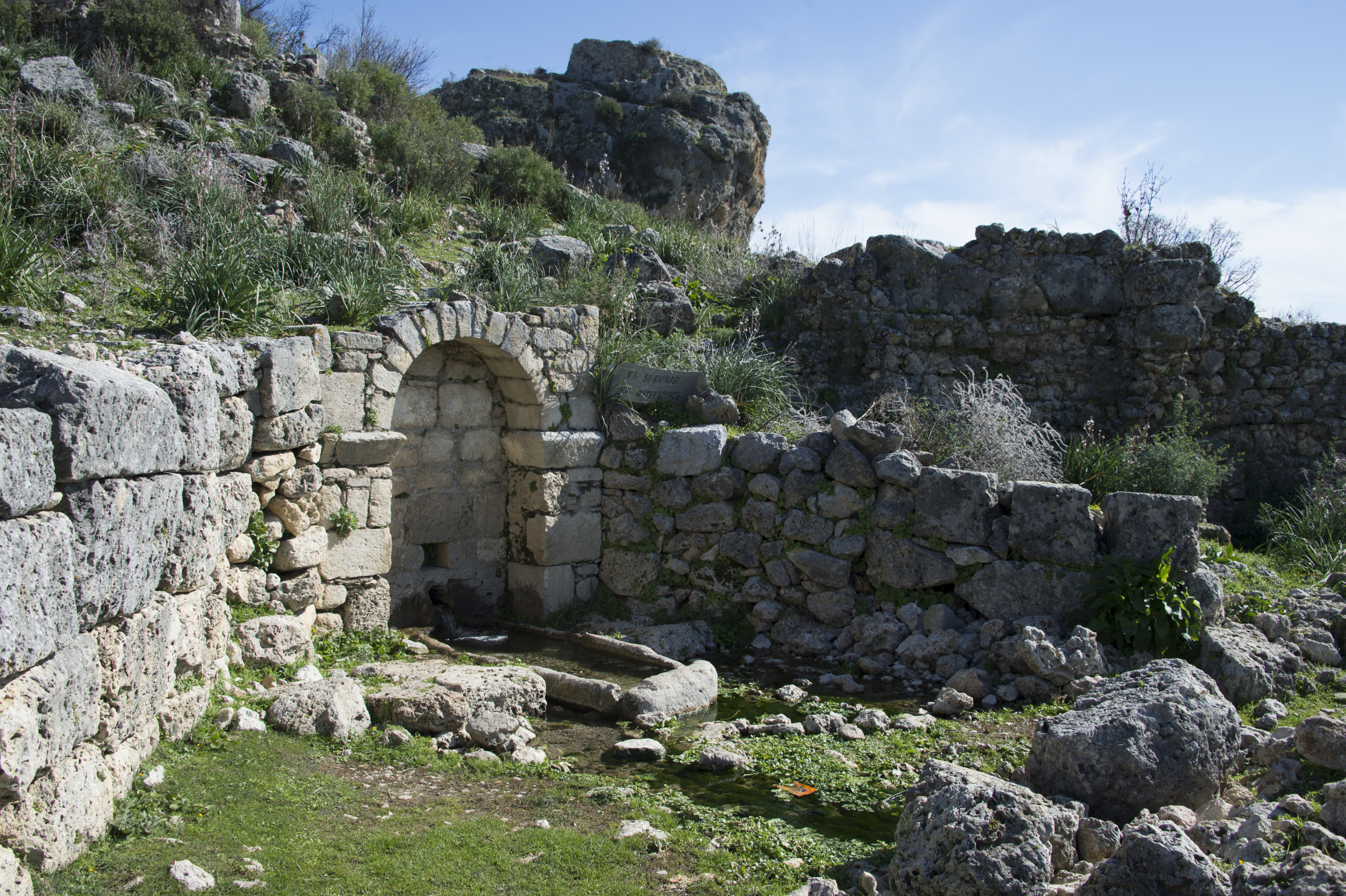
Water supply

== Sources ==
- Kazhdan, Alexander, ed. (1991). Oxford Dictionary of Byzantium. Oxford University Press. p. 1980. ISBN 978-0-19-504652-6.
- Lang, Gernot (2003). Klassische antike Stätten Anatoliens, Band II: Larissa-Zeleia. Books on Demand GmbH. pp. 439–443. ISBN 978-3-8330-0068-3.
- Niewöhner, Philipp (2007). "Archäologie und die "Dunklen Jahrhunderte" im byzantinischen Anatolien". In Henning, Joachim (ed.). Post-Roman Towns, Trade and Settlement in Europe and Byzantium, Vol. 2: Byzantium, Pliska, and the Balkans. Walter de Gruyter. pp. 130–131. ISBN 978-3-11-018358-0.
