= John Ioubes =

John Ioubes (Greek: Ἰωάννης Ἰούβης) was a Byzantine official (qualified as illoustrios) in the middle of the 10th century at Chalcedon. He is known from the hagiography of St. Luke the Stylite. According to it, his pregnant wife was in pain for 22 days but could not give birth, until they called upon the saint's help. He is likely a descendant of Ioube (Ἰούβη, Hellenized form of Ayyub), an Arab whose sons, Niketas and Chase, came to Byzantium as prisoners and entered imperial service. This Arab origin is likely why the text of the hagiography records that the surname "Ioubes" was used derisively.

== Sources ==
- Lilie, Ralph-Johannes; Ludwig, Claudia; Pratsch, Thomas; Zielke, Beate (2013). Prosopographie der mittelbyzantinischen Zeit Online. Berlin-Brandenburgische Akademie der Wissenschaften. Nach Vorarbeiten F. Winkelmanns erstellt (in German). Berlin and Boston: De Gruyter.
