= Chase (son of Ioube) =

Chase, the son of Ioube (Greek: Χασὲ υἱὸς τοῦ Ἰούβη), originally Hasan ibn Ayyub, was a senior Byzantine official of Arab origin.

== Biography ==
Chase, a Hellenized form of the Arabic name "Hasan", is mentioned by the De Administrando Imperio, a work compiled in the middle of the 10th century by Constantine VII Porphyrogennetos, and the chronicles of Theophanes Continuatus and Georgius Monachus. Along with his younger brother, who received the Christian name Niketas on his baptism, he was reportedly a slave of the patrikios Damian, the parakoimomenos of Emperor Michael III (r. 842–867), implying that they had been captured as prisoners of war during a conflict with the Arabs around the middle of the 9th century or shortly after. It is unclear whether they came alone or with their father Ioube (Ἰούβη, Hellenized form of Ayyub); it is possible that they came to Byzantium as children, and that Niketas was even born there. Unlike his brother, who converted to Christianity, Chase remained a Muslim throughout his life.

Constantine VII asserts that during the reign of his uncle Alexander (r. 912–913), Chase was one of his closest confidantes. Constantine VII further accuses him of having a negative influence on the emperor. According to the chroniclers, he held a fiscal position in the theme of Hellas thereafter. He became quickly hated by the local inhabitants due to his incessant demands, until he was stoned to death before the altar of a church (most likely the converted Parthenon) in Athens. As he was a Muslim, he may have tried to seek sanctuary there, or otherwise his entering of the church may have outraged the congregation leading to his murder. His death took place probably in 915.

The illoustrios John Ioubes later in the century was possibly a descendant or otherwise a relative.

== Sources ==
- Lilie, Ralph-Johannes; Ludwig, Claudia; Pratsch, Thomas; Zielke, Beate (2013). Prosopographie der mittelbyzantinischen Zeit Online. Berlin-Brandenburgische Akademie der Wissenschaften. Nach Vorarbeiten F. Winkelmanns erstellt (in German). Berlin and Boston: De Gruyter.
