= Saint Philaretos =

Saint Saint Philaretos the Merciful
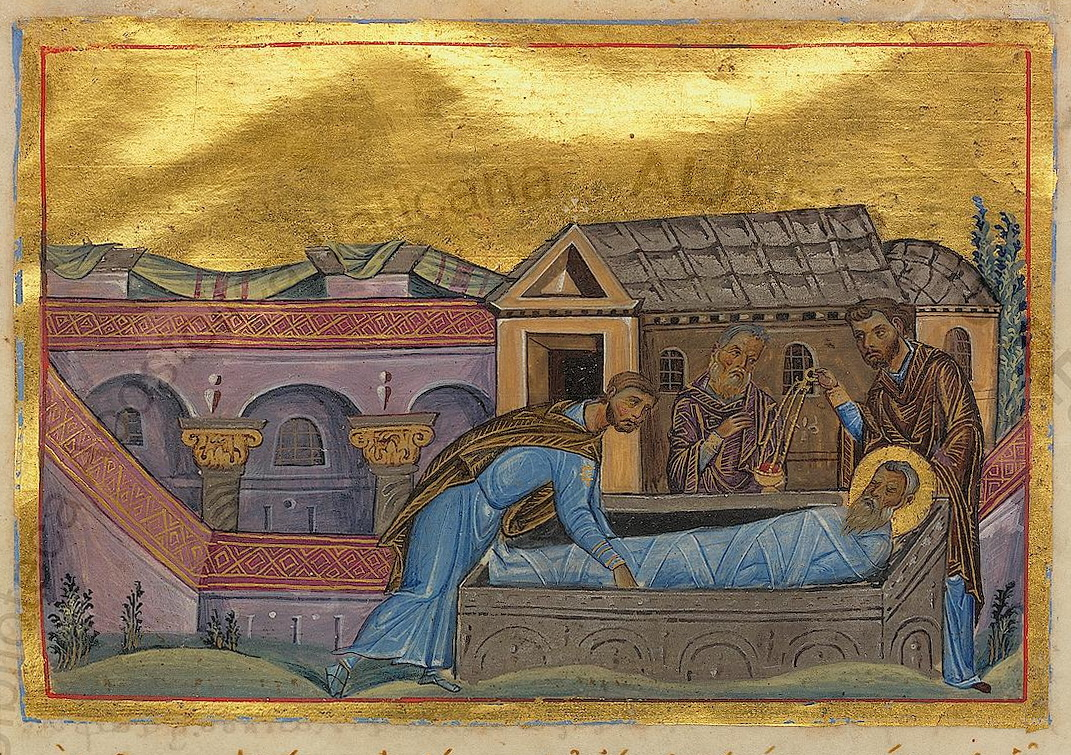
- Miniature of the repose of Saint Philaretos, Menologion of Basil II
- Born: 8th Century; Amnia, Paphlagonia
- Died: 792; Amnia, Paphlagonia
- Venerated in: Eastern Orthodox Church
- Major shrine: Rodolpheia (“The Judgment”) monastery, Constantinople
- Feast: December 1

Saint Philaretos (Greek: Άγιος Φιλάρετος) lived sometime in the early 8th century. Born in Paphlagonia, Philaretos was very rich and belonged to an illustrious local aristocratic family of Byzantine Anatolian magnates. According to the hagiography written by his grandson Niketas, Philaretos possessed unworldly generosity and gave away most of his wealth. It depicts Philaretos as a fool for Christ.

Saint Philaretos was raised by Christians named Georgios and Anna in the 8th Century in Amnia. He married a wealthy woman named Theoseba and had three children, named Ioannes, Hypatia, and Evanthia, with her. He was wealthy himself, but remembered various encouragements from the scriptures to give alms, such as how one should serve “these least ones” in Matthew 25:40. Arabs had eventually raided his home and left only a couple oxen, a cow, its calf, a beehive, and a donkey, but he willingly gave these to the needy. His wife reprimanded him, but he reminded her, "I have hidden away riches and treasure", as well as "so much that it would be enough for you to feed and clothe yourselves, even if you lived a hundred years without working". His generous gifts gained a reputation of multiplying in one's possession, so a man requested Saint Philaretos' calf to cultivate a herd. His discontented wife had told him in response, “You have no pity on us, you merciless man, but don’t you feel sorry for the cow? You have separated her from her calf.” Saint Philaretos agreed with her and summoned the recipient of the calf to give him his cow as well. During a famine, Saint Philaretos asked his wife to distribute wheat to one who asked, but she had demanded, "First you must give a bushel to each of us in the family, then you can give away the rest as you choose". Philaretos gave the man two bushels at which his wife made a sarcastic remark, "Give him half the load so you can share it". He obliged, eventually giving the man his entire supply of wheat and his donkey, but his family wept because of this loss. The hagiography accordingly describes how the Lord rewarded the Saint when his friend gave him 40 bushels of wheat.

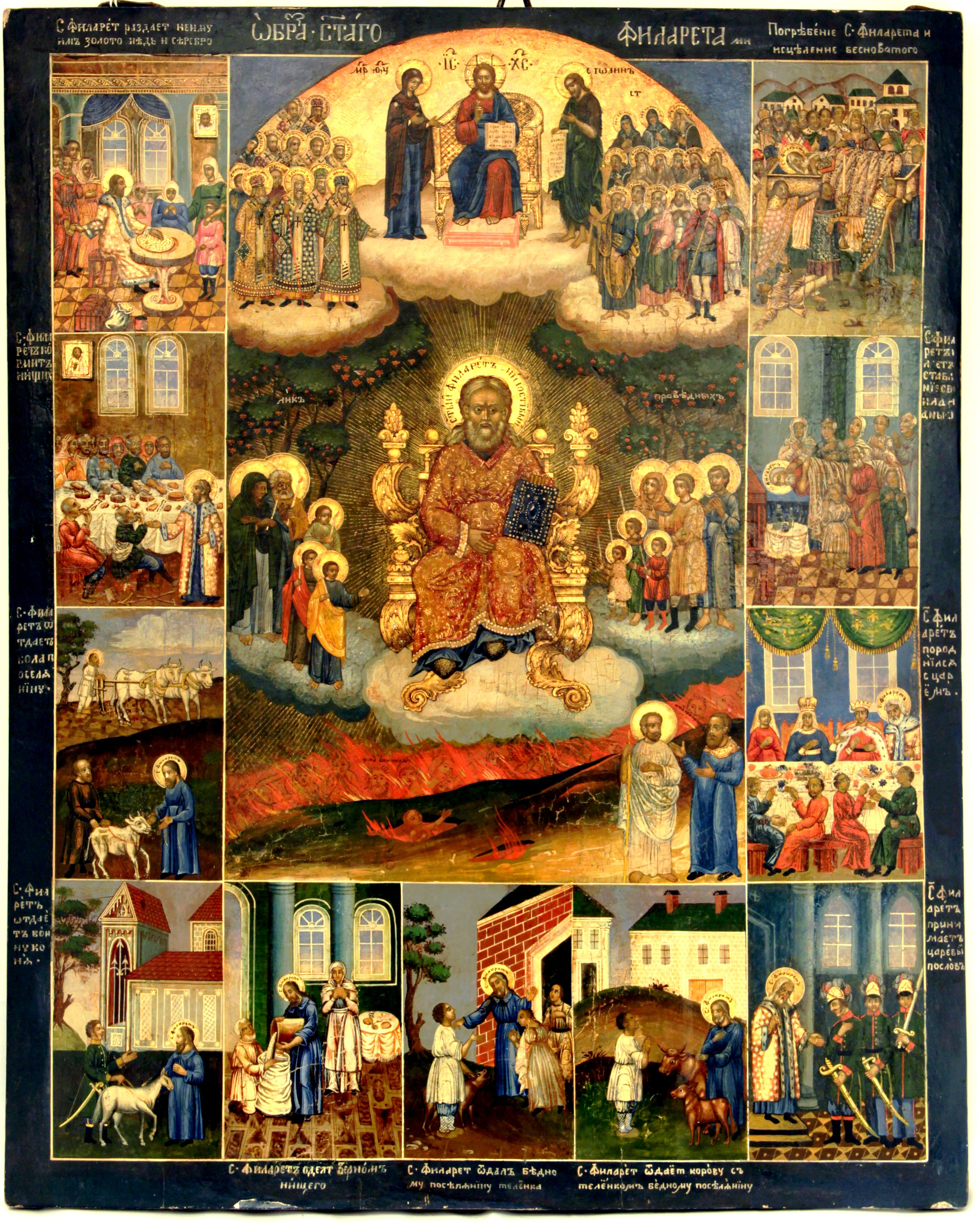
Russian icon of Saint Philaretos

During the period of time in which Empress Irene was seeking a wife for her son, Constantine, they eventually arrived in Amnia. Saint Philaretos and Theoseba held a feast and the imperial family was impressed with Philaretos' own and chose his granddaughter Maria for marriage. This allowed for Philaretos to provide for the poor even more, even hosting a feast for them. On one occasion, he filled three bags with gold, silver, and copper, and distributed the contents to the poor, not being able to distinguish between the bags. He refused to don expensive clothing or receive any titles.

Near the end of his life, at the age of 90, he requested to the abbess of the Rodolphia monastery in Constantinople that he be buried there, giving some gold to her, and informing him of his impending passing in 10 days. He died in 792 in his home beside his family, charging them to give alms as he did. Theoseba worked in the restoration of churches and monasteries for the remainder of her life.

The hagiography is also noteworthy for those studying the period. The lands of Paphlagonia, for example, are described as having been raided by the "Ishmaelites", attesting to the success of Islamic raids into Byzantine territory, as Paphlagonia is within a few days' ride of Constantinople.

Furthermore, the work reveals the possible political undertones of Philaretos's canonization. Becoming a saint at the time required substantial investments, including a cult, churches built throughout imperial territory and a sustained endowment to continually petition the Church and Bishop synods to grant sainthood. Some historians have suggested that Niketas wrote the hagiography in order to legitimize the family and increase its prestige. Maria of Amnia, Philaretos's granddaughter, had married Emperor Constantine VI of the Byzantine Empire largely at the insistence of his powerful mother Empress Irene in the first recorded bride-show. The bride-show might have been an attempt by Irene to marry her son to a girl with no substantial connections and thus to reduce his power. Empress Irene relentlessly maintained her power even as her son matured and the regency ended. In fact, the hagiography by Niketas refers to the Empress Irene as "Basileus" Irene, using the masculine form of the Greek word meaning 'emperor' to indicate her powerful role.

After Constantine VI succeeded in wresting power from his mother, he also divorced Maria. Thus, the work of Niketas might be seen as an attempt to shore up the family's ancestry with a holy and respected figure in order to confer prestige and legitimacy in the aftermath of the divorce.
