= Trojanus of Saintes =

Trojanus of Saintes (died c.530) was a sixth-century bishop of Saintes, in France. He is mentioned in semi-legendary terms by Gregory of Tours. He is identified with the author of a surviving letter to Eumerius of Nantes.

He is a Catholic saint, known also as Trojan and Troyen; his feast day is November 30.
