= Mardaites =

Early Christian group

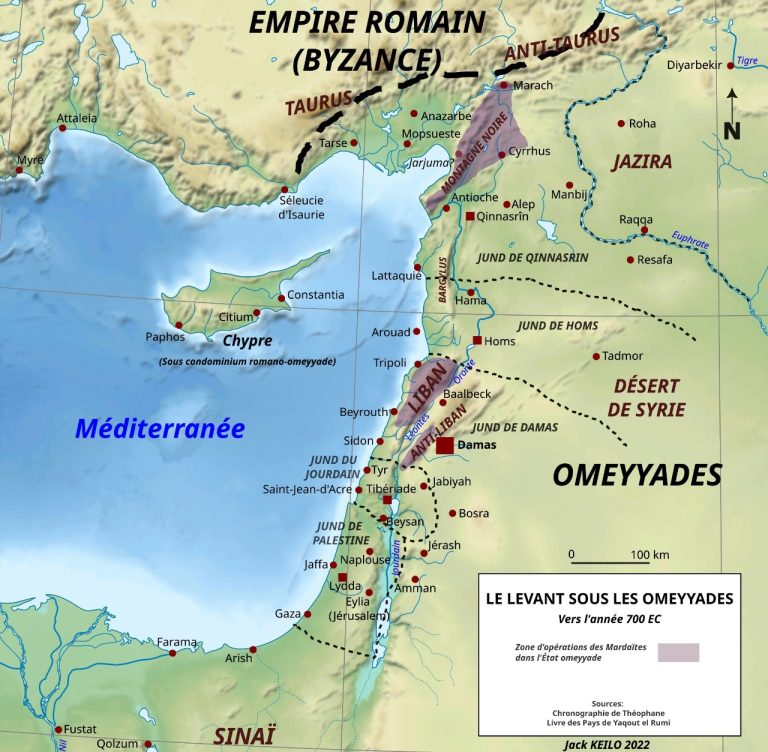
- Main areas under Mardaite control in the Levant, c. 7th century AD

Regions with significant populations
- Levant, Anatolia, the Balkans

Languages
- Unknown; possibly Syriac, Armenian, or an Iranian language

Religion
- Christianity

Related ethnic groups
- Maronites, Greeks, South Slavs, Albanians

The Mardaites (Medieval Greek: Μαρδαΐται; Arabic: المَرَدة) or al-Jarajima (Syriac: ܡܪ̈ܕܝܐ; Arabic: جَرَاجِمَة/ALA-LC: Jarājimah) were early Christians following Chalcedonian Christianity in the Nur Mountains. Little is known about their ethnicity, but it has been speculated that they might have been Persians (see, for a purely linguistic hypothesis, the Amardi, located south of the Caspian Sea in classical times) with other theories placing them as Armenians or even Greeks native to the Levant. Their other Arabic name, al-Jarājimah, suggests that some were natives of the town Jurjum in Cilicia; the word marada in Arabic is the plural of mared, which could mean a giant, a supernatural being like Jinn, a high mountain or a rebel.

Whether their name was due to their existence outside of legitimate political authority or their residence in the mountains is not known. They were joined later by various escaped slaves and peasants during their insurgency and were said to have claimed territory from "the Holy City" to the "Black Mountain" (Nur Mountains).

== History ==
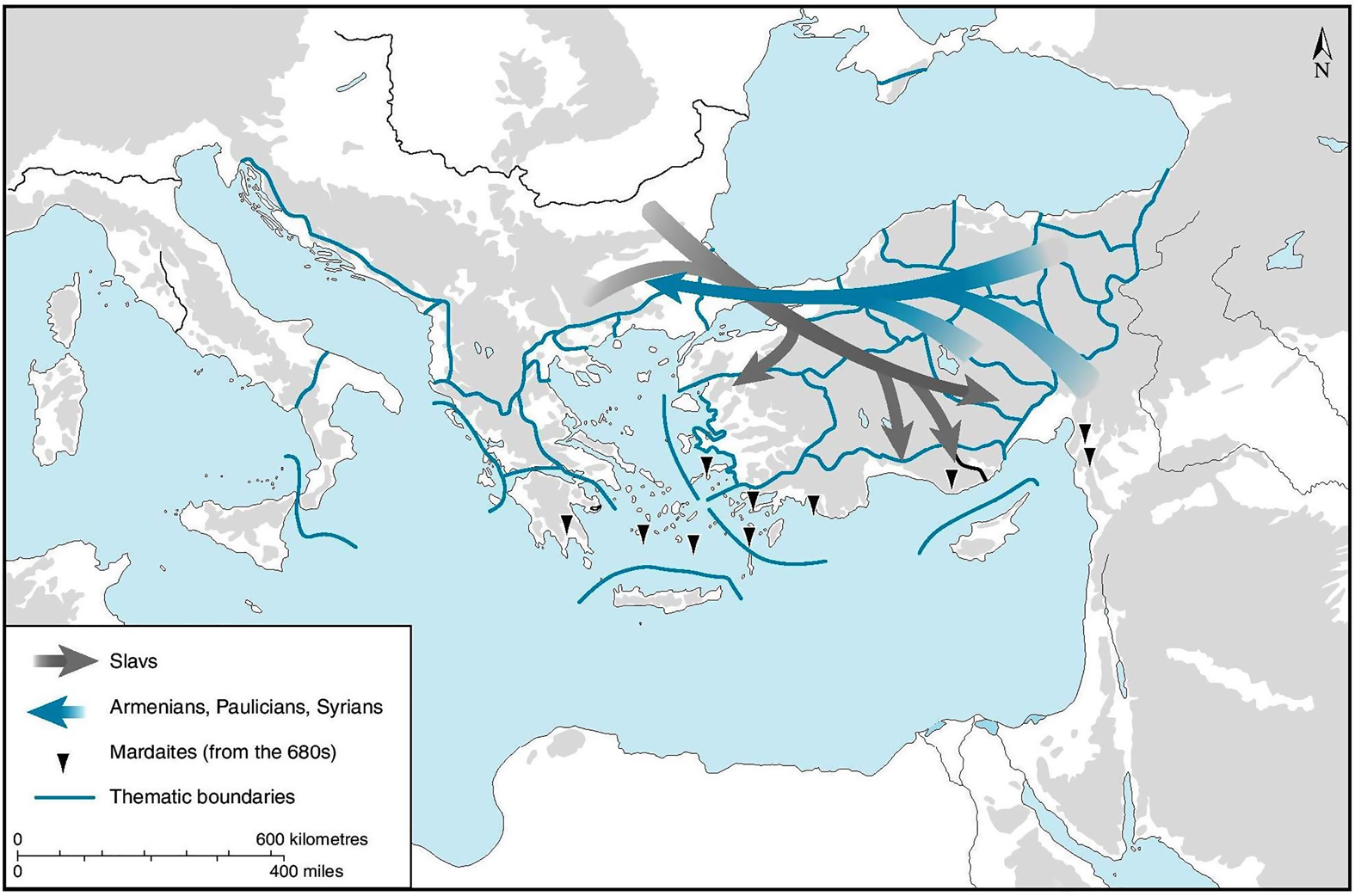
Map showing the areas that the Mardaites were forcibly resettled in after 685 AD

After the Muslim conquest of the Levant, the Mardaites gained a semi-independent status around the Nur Mountains within al-ʿAwāṣim, the Byzantine-Arab border region. They initially agreed to serve as mercenaries for the Arabs and to guard the Amanian Gate, but their loyalty was intermittent and they often sided with the Byzantine Empire as their agenda varied. According to Greek and Syriac historians, their territory stretched from the Amanus to the "holy city", the latter often identified as Jerusalem, although more likely to refer to Cyrrhus, also called Hagioupolis, the capital of Cyrrhestica, in upper Syria. Their numbers were swelled by thousands of runaway slaves, making them an ethnically diverse group. In light of this, it is claimed that they forced Muawiyah I, Caliph of the Umayyad Caliphate, to pay tribute to the Byzantine emperor Constantine IV, or possibly to them instead. Emperor Justinian II sent the Mardaites again to raid Syria in 688/9; this time they were joined by native peasants and slaves and were able to advance as far as Lebanon.

The Umayyads were compelled to sign another treaty by which they paid the Byzantines half the tribute of Cyprus, Armenia and the Kingdom of Iberia in the Caucasus Mountains; in return, Justinian relocated around 12,000 Mardaites to mostly the southern coast of Anatolia, and some the area of Mani and Laecedemon in the Southern Peloponnese, being under Byzantine control, and Cephalonia as part of his measures to restore population and manpower to areas depleted by earlier conflicts. There they were conscripted as rowers and marines in the Byzantine navy for several centuries. Others however remained behind and continued raiding Muslim-held territories until their chief stronghold fell to Umayyad prince-general Maslama ibn Abd al-Malik in 708. Maslama then resettled them throughout Syria, and although he allowed them to retain their faith, he conscripted them into his army.

Describing the abna' of Yemen, Abu al-Faraj al-Isfahani states in his Kitab al-Aghani that, up to his time (10th century), these people were called "banū al-aḥrār (بنو الأحرار) in Sanaa, al-abnāʾ in Yemen, al-aḥāmira (الأحامرة) in Kufa, al-asāwira (الأساورة) in Basra, al-khaḍārima (الخضارمة) in al-Jazira, and al-jarājima (الجراجمة) in Bilad al-Sham".

== Notable Mardaites ==
- Abulchares
- Leo of Tripoli
- Michael Attaleiates
- Nasar
- Staurakios Platys

== See also ==
- Akritai
- Marada Movement
- Mardaite revolts
- Al-Jarajimah neighborhood (Hama)
- Mardati (village in Crete, Greece)
