= Ek prosopou =

The title of ek prosopou (Greek: ἐκ προσώπου), meaning "representative", was widely used in the middle Byzantine Empire (9th–12th centuries) for deputies of various office holders.

The title could be applied in a generic sense to any senior official, such as the strategos of a theme, who was in a sense the deputy of the Byzantine Emperor. In a more technical sense, as used in the Taktika or lists of offices of the 9th–11th centuries, it was used by subordinate officials who deputized for a strategos or other provincial governor or one of the central government ministries for a specific district (called ekprosopike by Kekaumenos). The same usage is also attested in the ecclesiastical hierarchy.

== Sources ==
- Bury, John Bagnell (1911). The Imperial Administrative System of the Ninth Century - With a Revised Text of the Kletorologion of Philotheos. London: Oxford University Press. pp. 46–47.
- Kazhdan, Alexander, ed. (1991). The Oxford Dictionary of Byzantium. Oxford and New York: Oxford University Press. p. 683. ISBN 0-19-504652-8.
