= October 23 (Eastern Orthodox liturgics) =

Day in the Eastern Orthodox liturgical calendar

Eastern Orthodox liturgical calendar
October 22	October 23	October 24
October 23 O.S. ≍ November 5 N.S. October 23 N.S ≍ October 10 O.S.

An Eastern Orthodox cross

October 23 in Eastern Orthodox liturgical calendars is a feast day and a day of commemoration of saints and martyrs. Although some Orthodox churches use the Revised Julian Calendar and others use the traditional Julian calendar, the fixed commemorations for their respective October 23 are broadly the same, no matter which calendar is used. (Note: Despite the dates being the same, the days to which they refer typically differ by 13 days. The notation Old Style or O.S. is sometimes used to indicate a date in the traditional Julian Calendar (the "Old Calendar"). The notation New Style or N.S. indicates a date in the Revised Julian calendar (the "New Calendar").)

== Saints ==
- Holy Apostle James, the Brother of the Lord, first Bishop of Jerusalem (c. 63) (Note: Name days celebrated today include: Iakovos, Jacob, Jakob, James (Ἰάκωβος).)
- Venerable Petronius of Egypt, disciple of St. Pachomius the Great (346)
- Venerable Ignatios of Constantinople, Patriarch of Constantinople (877-878) (Note: "At Constantinople, St. Ignatius, bishop, who, for having reproved the emperor Bardas for putting away his wife, was subjected by him to many insults and driven into banishment. Being restored to his See by the Roman Pontiff Nicholas, he finally rested in peace.")
- Saint Macarius the Roman, of Mesopotamia.
- Venerable Nicephorus of Charsianos, Constantinople.

== Pre-Schism Western saints ==
- Saints Servandus and Germanus, sons of St Marcellus of Léon in Spain, martyred in Cadiz while on their way to Tangiers under arrest (c. 305) (Note: "IN the territory of Ossuma, in Spain, near Cadiz, the holy martyrs Servandus and Germanus, in the persecution of Diocletian, under the lieutenant Viator. After being subjected to scourging, imprisonment in a foul dungeon, want of food and drink, and the fatigue of a very long journey, which they had to perform loaded with fetters, they at length reached the term of their martyrdom by having their heads stricken off. Germanus was buried at Merida, and Servandus at Seville.")
- Saint Amon of Toul, Second Bishop of Toul in France, the successor of St Mansuetus (4th century)
- Saint Verus, third Bishop of Salerno in Italy (4th century)
- Saint Severin of Cologne, third known Bishop of Cologne and a prominent opponent of Arianism (c. 403) (Note: "At Bordeaux, St. Severin, bishop of Cologne and confessor.")
- Saint Severinus of Bordeaux (Seurin), Bishop of Bordeaux in France (c. 420)
- Saint Clether (Cleer, Clydog, Scledog, Clitanus or Cleodius), one of the twenty-four children of Saint Brychan, a Welsh saint and King of Brycheiniog (c. 520) (Note: He left Wales and went to Cornwall. He is recalled by several church dedications, for instance St Clear near Liskeard.)
- Saint Severinus Boethius, a Roman senator, consul, magister officiorum, and philosopher, martyred at Pavia in Italy (524) (Note: The statesman and philosopher Anicius Manlius Torquatus Severinus Boethius was the author of De Consolatione Philosophiae. About the year 534 he fell into disfavour with the barbarian king and was martyred at Pavia in Italy. His relics are enshrined at the Cathedral of Pavia.)
- Saint John of Syracuse (Ioannes), Bishop of Syracuse in Sicily from 595 (c. 609) (Note: Pope Gregory I had suggested the name of Ioannes, Archdeacon of Catania, after he rejected the first candidate in February 595. In October 595 Bishop Ioannes was granted the pallium.)
- Saint Romanus of Rouen, Bishop of Rouen (639) (Note: He devoted himself to the care of prisoners, particularly those condemned to death, and he also preached actively against paganism.) (Note: "BENEDICT, father of S. Romanus, was of noble Frank family, related to Clovis. He was converted and baptized by S. Remigius, probably at the same time as his royal master and kinsman. The wife of Benedict was Felicitas, and Romanus was their only son. He was born about A.D. 561, and as soon as he had attained a suitable age was summoned by Clothair II to his court, and there he made acquaintance with those earnest-souled, devout men, S. Ouen and S. Eligius. On the death of S. Hildulf, about A.D. 631, he was appointed to fill his place as Bishop of Rouen. His relics were burnt by the Calvinists in 1562. Till the French Revolution the Chapter of Rouen had a right, called the Privilege de S. Romain, or Privilege de la Fierté, to obtain the release of a captive from chains and death, who should bear the shrine of the saint.")
- Saint Benedict of Sebaste, Bishop of Sebaste in Samaria, who fled to Gaul and built a hermitage near Poitiers (c.654) (Note: "In Poitou, St. Benedict, confessor.") (Note: During the persecutions of the era he fled to Gaul and built a hermitage near Poitiers, later transformed into an abbey.)
- Saint Syra, a nun at Faremoutiers Abbey, from where she was asked by Bishop Ragnebaud to become Abbess of Châlons-sur-Marne (c. 660) (Note: See: (in French) Syre (sainte). Wikipédia. (French Wikipedia).)
- Saint Leothadius (Léothade), Abbot of Moissac Abbey in the south of France, later he became Bishop of Auch (718)
- Saint Oda of Amay, Belgium (Ode)], foundress of churches (723) (Note: A princess married to the Duke of Aquitaine in France. As a widow she devoted herself to the care of the poor and suffering. Her shrine is in Amay in Belgium.)
- Saint Domitius, hermit near Amiens in France (8th century) (Note: "In Picardy, St. Domitius, priest.")
- Saint Elfleda (Aelflead), a princess who lived as an anchoress in Glastonbury Abbey; she was revered by St Dunstan (c. 936) (Note: "There are three saints of this name: Elfleda of Whitby, Feb. 8; Elfleda the daughter of Edward the Elder, Oct 29; and; Elfleda the Widow, of Glastonbury, given by Alford in his Index of English Saints on April 13, but in the "British Martyrology" on April 14; but the Auctuarium [sic] of the Martyrology of Usuardus, belonging formerly to the Church of Winchester, inserts: "S. Elfleda, Queen," on Oct. 23.; Authorities:—The Lives of S. Dunstan, both that which is anonymous and that by Osbern.")
- Saint Ethelfleda (Elfleda), Abbess of Romsey Abbey (c. 970) (Note: Daughter of Earl Ethelwold, founder of Romsey in England, she became a nun there and eventually abbess after St Merewenna.) (Note: "ST. ELFLEDA was the daughter of the Earl Ethelwold, who founded the Abbey of Rumsey in the reign of Edward the Elder. The King interested himself in the pious undertaking, and induced St. Merwenna to charge herself with the government of the house and the formation of a community of holy women. Elfleda became one of her first disciples, and so greatly profited by the training of her holy mistress, that she was considered worthy to be chosen Abbess in due time, and acquired the reputation of eminent sanctity. She was buried in the Abbey Church, near her beloved mistress.")

== Post-Schism Orthodox saints ==
- Venerable Elisha (Elisæus) of Lauryshava Monastery in Belarus, Igumen (1250) (Note: See: (in Belarusian) Елісей Лаўрышаўскі. Вікіпедыя. (Belarusian Wikipedia).)

=== New Martys and Confessors ===
- New Hieromartyr Eusebius (Rozhdestvensky), Archbishop of Shadrinsk (1937) (Note: See: (in Russian) Евсевий (Рождественский). Википе́дия. (Russian Wikipedia).)
- New Hieromartyr Vladimir Ambartsumov, Archpriest, of Moscow (1937) (Note: See: (in Russian) Амбарцумов, Владимир Амбарцумович. Википе́дия. (Russian Wikipedia).)
- New Hieromartyrs Nicholas Agafonnikov, Alexander Soloviev, Nicholas Archangelsky, Emilian Goncharov and Sozon Reshetilov, Priests (1937)
- Venerable Euphrosyne Timofeeva (1942)
- Hieromartyr Constantin Sârbu, Priest (1975) (Note: See: (in Romanian) Constantin Sârbu. Wikipedia. (Romanian Wikipedia).)

== Other commemorations ==
- Translation of the relics (1544) of Blessed James of Borovichi, Novgorod (1540) (Note: See: (in Russian) Иаков Боровичский. Википе́дия. (Russian Wikipedia).)

== Icon gallery ==
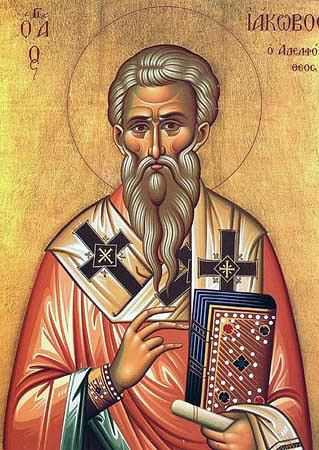
Holy Apostle James, the Brother of the Lord, first Bishop of Jerusalem.

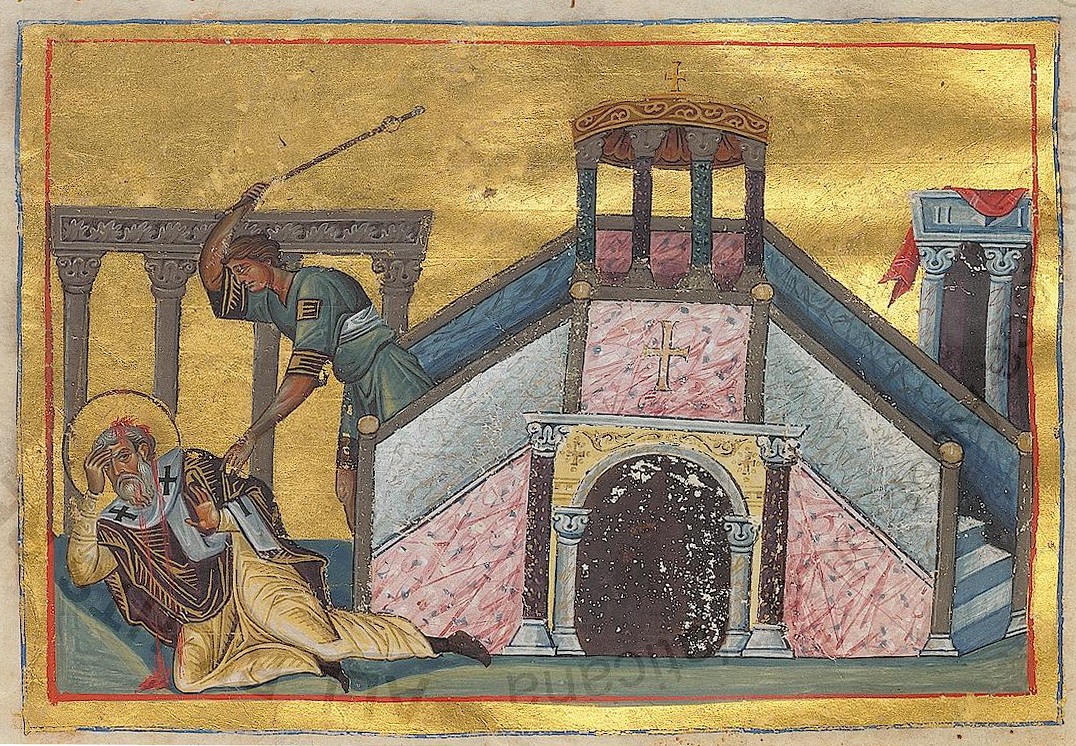
Holy Apostle James, the Brother of the Lord, first Bishop of Jerusalem.
(Menologion of Basil II, 10th century).

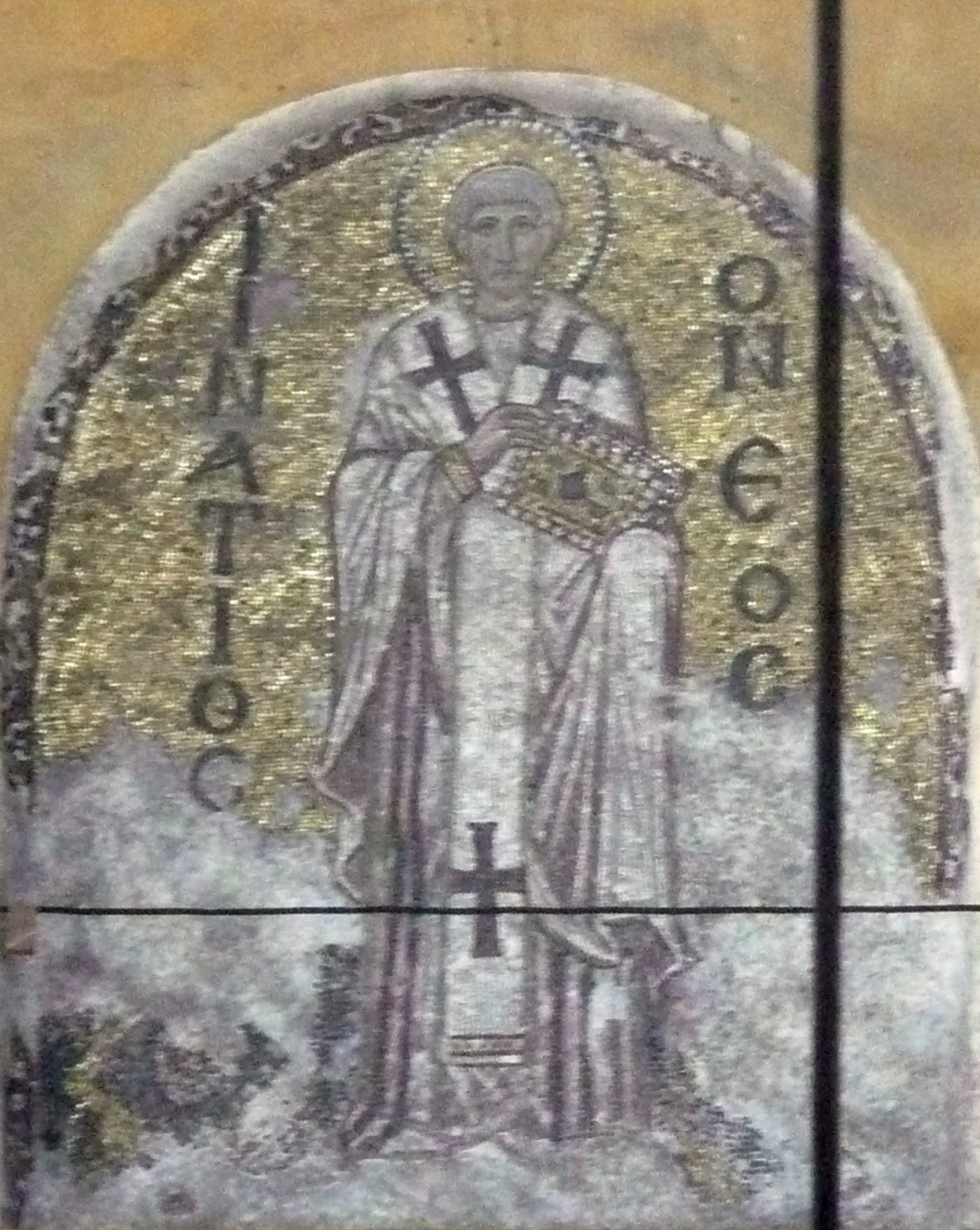
St. Ignatios of Constantinople, Patriarch of Constantinople (Hagia Sophia).

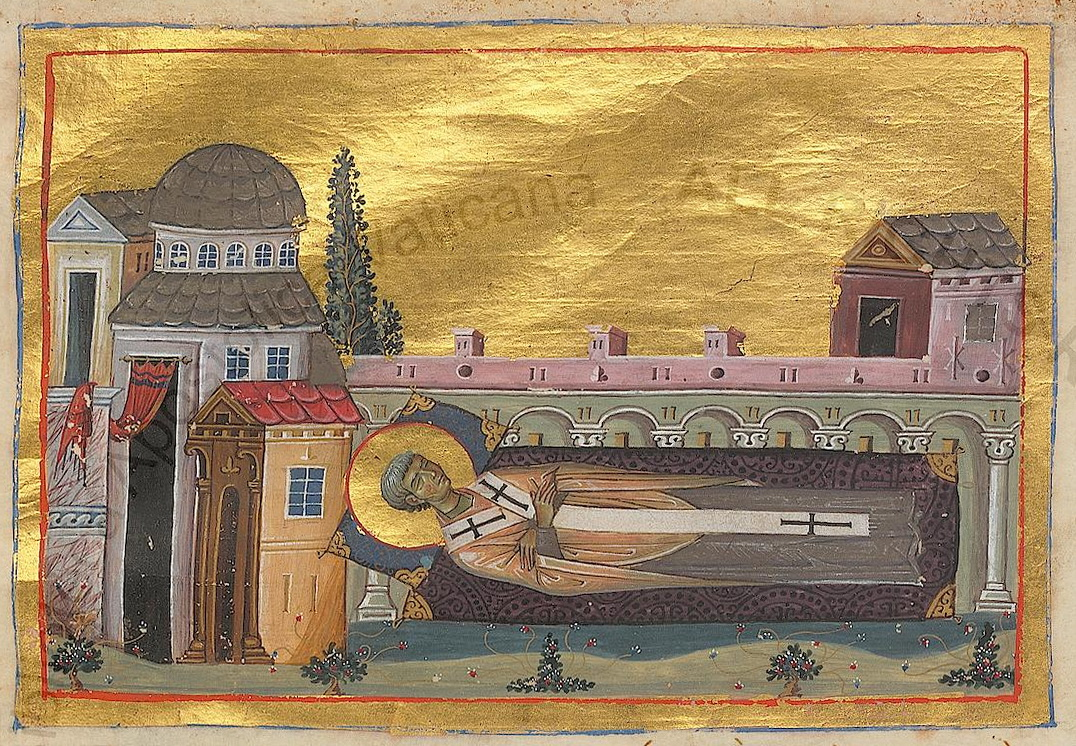
St. Ignatios of Constantinople, Patriarch of Constantinople.
(Menologion of Basil II, 10th century).

St. Macarius the Roman of Mesopotamia (left), and St. Macarius the Great of Egypt (right). (Note: The feast day of St. Macarius the Great of Egypt is on January 19.)
(Menologion of Basil II, 10th century).

St. Macarius the Roman of Mesopotamia
(Dionysiou Monastery, 1547).

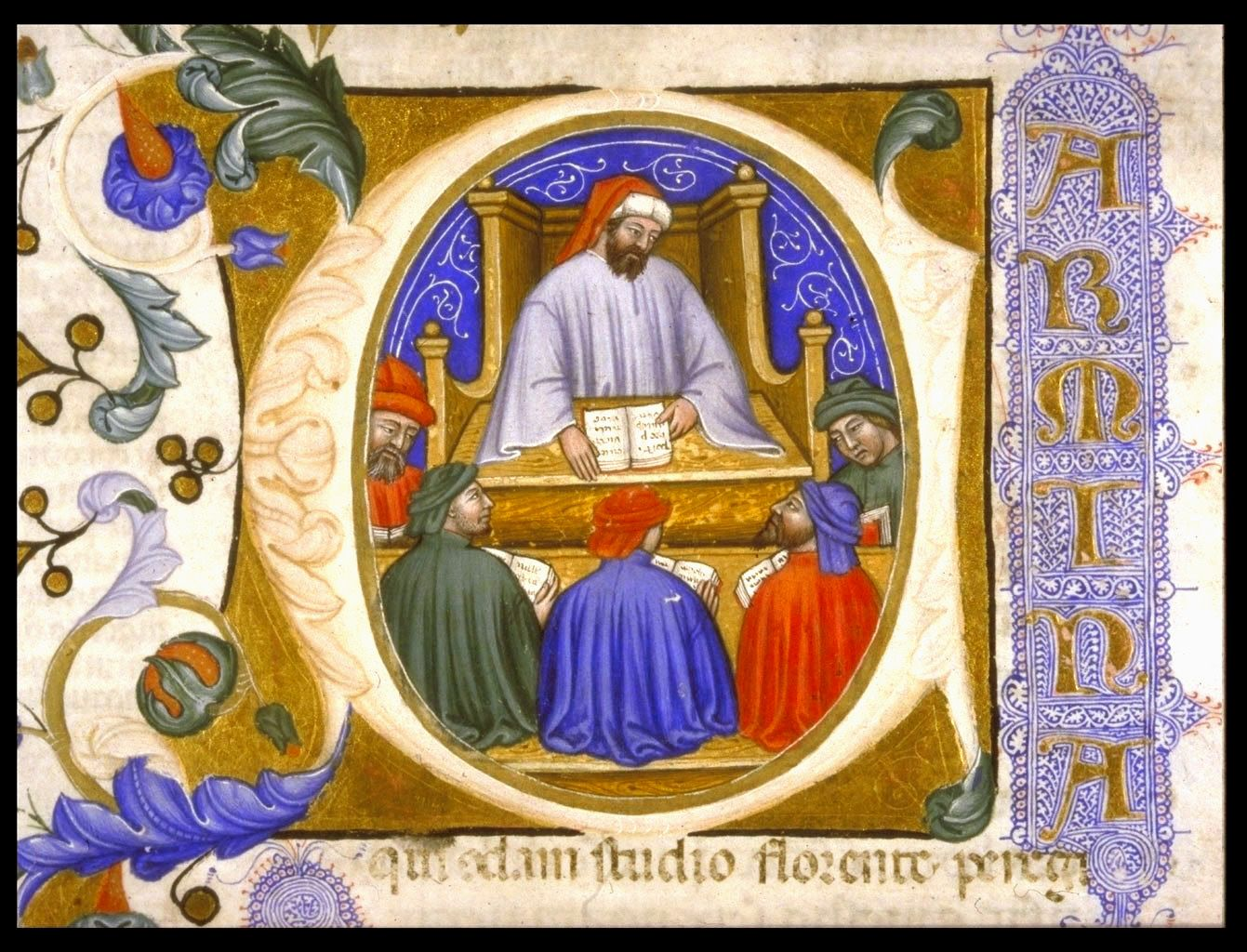
St. Severinus Boethius, teaching his students.

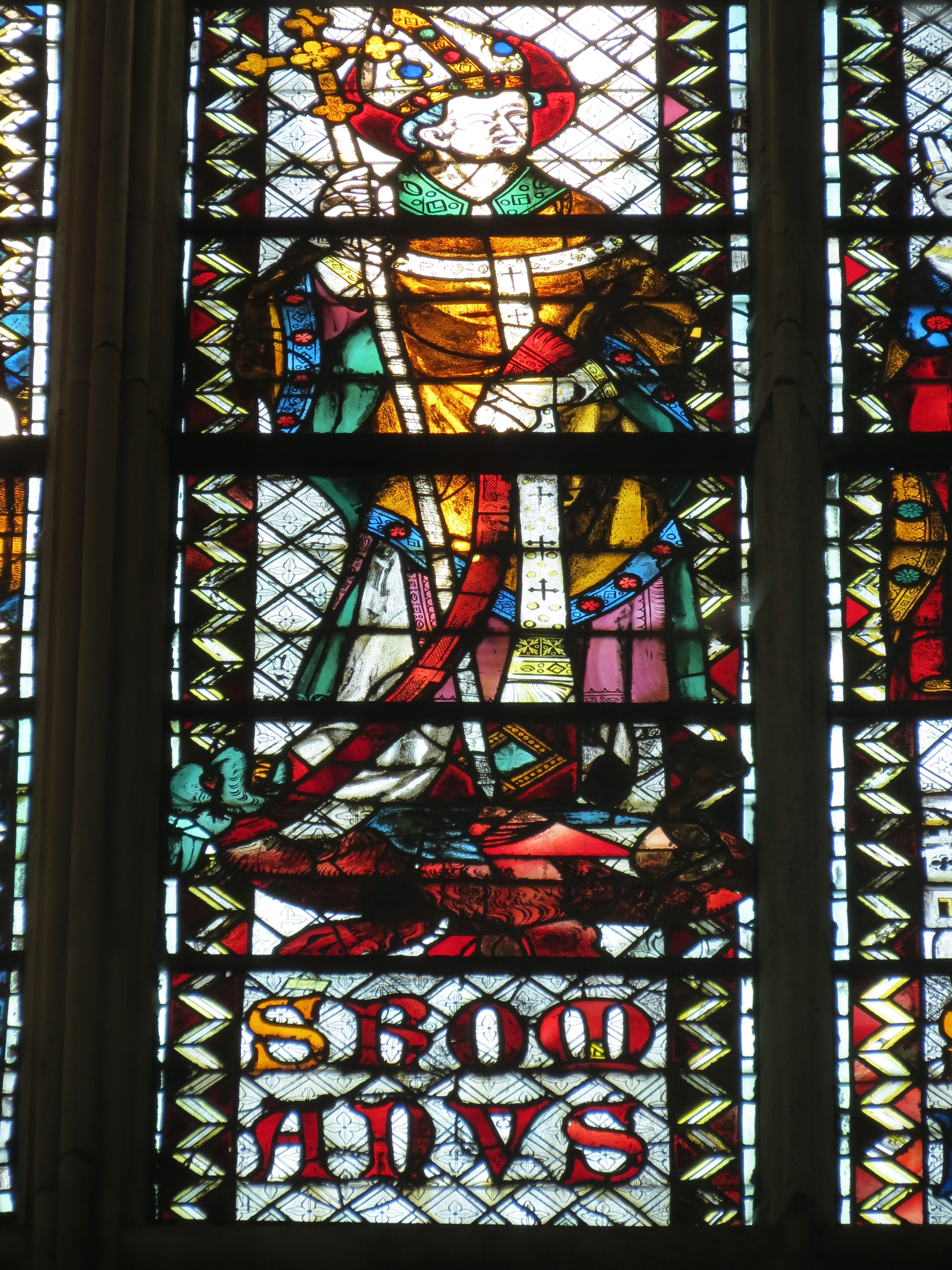
St. Romanus of Rouen, Bishop of Rouen.

New Hieromartyr Vladimir Ambartsumov, Archpriest, of Moscow.

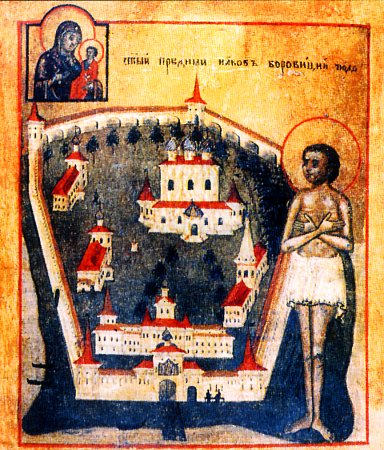
Blessed James of Borovichi, Novgorod.

== Sources ==
- October 23 / November 5. Orthodox Calendar (PRAVOSLAVIE.RU).
- November 5 / October 23. HOLY TRINITY RUSSIAN ORTHODOX CHURCH (A parish of the Patriarchate of Moscow).
- October 23. OCA - The Lives of the Saints.
- The Autonomous Orthodox Metropolia of Western Europe and the Americas (ROCOR). St. Hilarion Calendar of Saints for the year of our Lord 2004. St. Hilarion Press (Austin, TX). p. 79.
- The Twenty-Third Day of the Month of October. Orthodoxy in China.
- October 23. Latin Saints of the Orthodox Patriarchate of Rome.
- The Roman Martyrology. Transl. by the Archbishop of Baltimore. Last Edition, According to the Copy Printed at Rome in 1914. Revised Edition, with the Imprimatur of His Eminence Cardinal Gibbons. Baltimore: John Murphy Company, 1916. pp. 326–328.
- Rev. Richard Stanton. A Menology of England and Wales, or, Brief Memorials of the Ancient British and English Saints Arranged According to the Calendar, Together with the Martyrs of the 16th and 17th Centuries. London: Burns & Oates, 1892. pp. 511–512.

Greek Sources

- Great Synaxaristes: (in Greek) 23 ΟΚΤΩΒΡΙΟΥ. ΜΕΓΑΣ ΣΥΝΑΞΑΡΙΣΤΗΣ.
- (in Greek) Συναξαριστής. 23 Οκτωβρίου. ECCLESIA.GR. (H ΕΚΚΛΗΣΙΑ ΤΗΣ ΕΛΛΑΔΟΣ).
- (in Greek) 23/10/2017. Ορθόδοξος Συναξαριστής.

Russian Sources

- (in Russian) 5 ноября (23 октября). Православная Энциклопедия под редакцией Патриарха Московского и всея Руси Кирилла (электронная версия). (Orthodox Encyclopedia - Pravenc.ru).
- (in Russian) 23 октября по старому стилю / 5 ноября по новому стилю. Русская Православная Церковь - Православный церковный календарь на 2016 год.
