= October 22 (Eastern Orthodox liturgics) =

Day in the Eastern Orthodox liturgical calendar

Eastern Orthodox liturgical calendar
| October 21 | October 22 | October 23 |
October 22 O.S. ≍ November 4 N.S. October 22 N.S ≍ October 9 O.S.

An Eastern Orthodox cross

October 22 in Eastern Orthodox liturgical calendars is a feast day and a day of commemoration of saints and martyrs. Although some Orthodox churches use the Revised Julian Calendar and others use the traditional Julian calendar, the fixed commemorations for their respective October 22 are broadly the same, no matter which calendar is used. (Note: Despite the dates being the same, the days to which they refer typically differ by 13 days. The notation Old Style or O.S. is sometimes used to indicate a date in the traditional Julian Calendar (the "Old Calendar"). The notation New Style or N.S. indicates a date in the Revised Julian calendar (the "New Calendar").)

== From the Synaxarion ==
- Saint Zacharias the Martyr, Orthodox martyr, by drowning in the sea (either same as, or different from, saint commemorated on October 21)

== Saints ==
- Holy Equal-to-the-Apostles Abercius, Bishop and Wonderworker, of Hierapolis (167)
- Hieromartyr Alexander, Bishop, and Martyrs Heraclius, Anna, Elizabeth, Theodota, and Glyceria, at Adrianople (2nd-3rd centuries) (Note: "Also, the holy martyrs Alexander, bishop, Heracilus, soldier, and their companions.")
- The Holy Seven Youths ("Seven Sleepers") of Ephesus (250 and c. 446) (see also: August 4)
- Martyr Theodoret, at Antioch (362)
- Venerables Lot and Rufus, of Egypt (5th century)
- Saint Eulavios, Bishop of Lambousa (ancient Lapithos). (Note: There is no record of his life and activity as a bishop, nor the period in which he flourished. However there are two different local traditions ascribed to him, taken from his acolouthia. In one local tradition it was widely reported that this holy shepherd was a Bishop in Edessa, Syria. Yet another Cypriot tradition relates that Eulavios was the Bishop of Lambousa (ancient Lapithos), and that he had nothing to do with the saint from Edessa.)

== Pre-Schism Western saints ==
- Saint Philip of Fermo, Bishop and martyr of Fermo in Italy (c. 270) (Note: "At Fermo, in the Marches, St. Philip, bishop and martyr." His relics are enshrined in the Cathedral.)
- Saint Mellonius (Mellon), first Bishop of Rouen (314) (Note: By tradition born near Cardiff in Wales, he became the first Bishop of Rouen in France.) (Note: "Mellon had a vision, witnessed also by the Pope, commanding him to go and preach the Gospel in Neustria, or Normandy. He set out in obedience to the heavenly summons, and received in an extraordinary degree the gift of miracles, for the accomplishment of his work. Through his unwearied zeal and courage, and the many undeniable wonders wrought by him, the Faith of Christ made rapid progress in Rouen, and the Saint was happily constrained to erect a number of churches for their service. Mellon governed his church for many years, and when he felt his end approaching, retired to a solitary spot, where before long an Angel was sent to convey to him the happy message of his speedy deliverance.") (Note: "At Rouen, St. Melanius, bishop, who was ordained by pope St. Stephen, and sent thither to preach the Gospel.")
- Saint Nepotianus, Bishop of Clermont in France (c. 388)
- Saint Verecundus (Verecondo), Bishop of Verona in Italy (522) (Note: "At Verona, St. Verecundus, bishop and confessor.")
- Saint Simplicius, a disciple of St Benedict and third Abbot of Montecassino (c. 570)
- Saint Maroveus, a monk at Bobbio Abbey and founder of the monastery of Precipiano near Tortona in Italy (650)
- Saint Nunctus (Noint), Abbot of a monastery near Mérida in the west of Spain, murdered by robbers and venerated as a martyr (668)
- Saint Moderan (Moderamnus, Moran), Bishop of Rennes, then became a hermit in Berceto in Italy (c. 730) (Note: Born in Rennes in Brittany, he became bishop there in 703. About the year 720 he made a pilgrimage to Rome and ended his days as a hermit in Berceto in Italy.)
- Saint Benedict of Massérac (Benoît de Macérac), a Greek abbot who fled from Petras and settled in Macerac near Nantes in France (845)
- Saints Nunilo and Alodia, two sisters, a pair of child-martyrs from Huesca in Spain (851) (Note: Two sisters born in Adahuesca in Huesca in Spain. Daughters of a Muslim father and Christian mother, they were raised as Christians. After the death of their father, their mother married another Muslim, who brutally persecuted them and had them imprisoned. They were finally beheaded in Huesca during the persecution of Abderrahman II.) (Note: "At Huesca, in Spain, the holy virgins Nunilo and Alodia, sisters, who endured martyrdom by being condemned to capital punishment by the Saracens for the confession of the faith.")
- Saint Bertharius, a Benedictine abbot of Monte Cassino, martyred together with several of his monks by invading Saracens (884)
- Saint Donatus of Fiesole, born in Ireland, he went on pilgrimage to Rome and became Bishop of Fiesole near Florence in Italy (874) (Note: "In Tuscany, St. Donatus, of Scotland, bishop of Fiesoli.")

== Post-Schism Orthodox saints ==
- Saints Theodore and Paul, Abbots, of Rostov (1409)
- Saint Gregory of Methoni, Bishop of Methoni in Greece and Ethnomartyr (1825)
- Saint George the New Confessor, of Drama, Greece (1959) (see also: October 24 - Russian; November 4 - Greek)

=== New Martys and Confessors ===
- New Hieromartyrs(1937):

- Seraphim (Samoilovich), Archbishop of Uglich; (Note: See: (in Russian) Серафим (Самойлович). Википе́дия. (Russian Wikipedia).)
- Herman (Polyansky) and Menas (Shelaev), Archimandrites;
- Alexander Lebedev, Vladimir Sobolev, Basil Bogoyavlensky, and Alexander Andreyev, (Note: See: (in Russian) Андреев, Александр Александрович (протоиерей). Википе́дия. (Russian Wikipedia).) Priests.

- New Hieromartyrs Nicholas Bogoslovsky and Nicholas Ushakov, Priests (1937)
- New Hieromartyr Gregory (Vorobiev), Abbot, of Koprino, Yaroslavl (1937)

== Other commemorations ==
- The Kazan Icon of the Most Holy Theotokos (commemorating the deliverance from the Poles in 1612)
- Icons of the Mother of God "Andronikos" (Note: See: (in Russian) Андрониковская икона Божией Матери. Википе́дия. (Russian Wikipedia).) and "Jacobstadt" (17th century)
- Repose of Monk Joseph the Silent, of Kuban (1925)
- Repose of Metropolitan Nestor of Kamchatka and Petropavlovsk (1962)
- Repose of Protopresbyter Michael Pomazansky (1988)
- Uncovering of the relics (2012) of New Hieromartyr Nikodim (Kononov), Bishop of Belgorod (1918) (Note: See: (in Russian) Никодим (Кононов). Википе́дия. (Russian Wikipedia).) (see also: October 20)

== Icon gallery ==
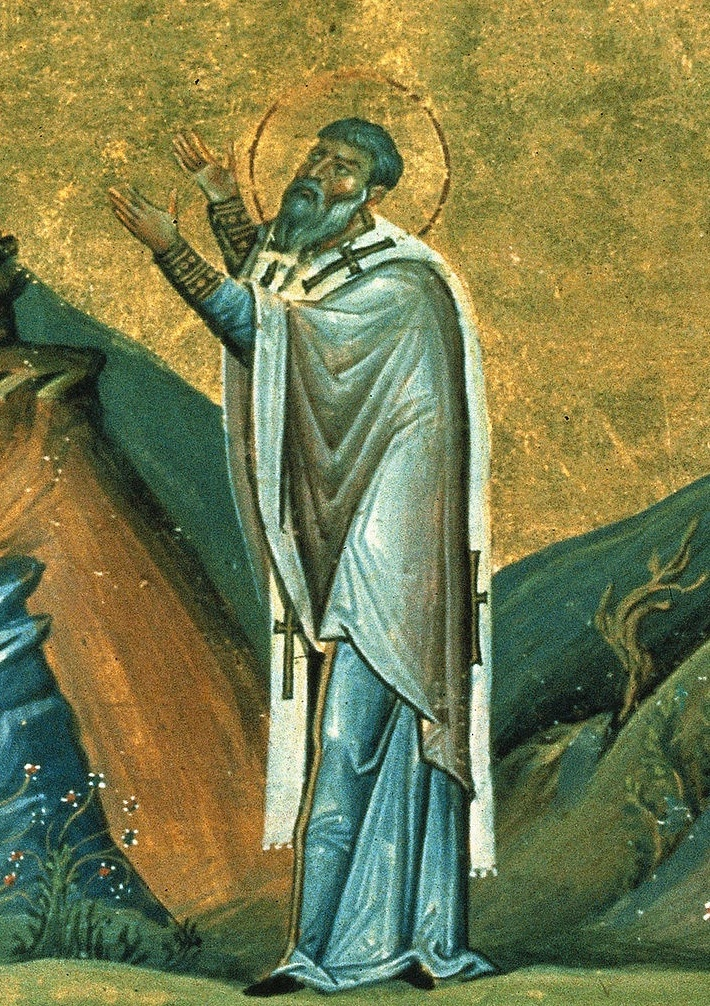
Holy Equal-to-the-Apostles Abercius, Bishop and Wonderworker, of Hierapolis.
(Menologion of Basil II, 10th century).

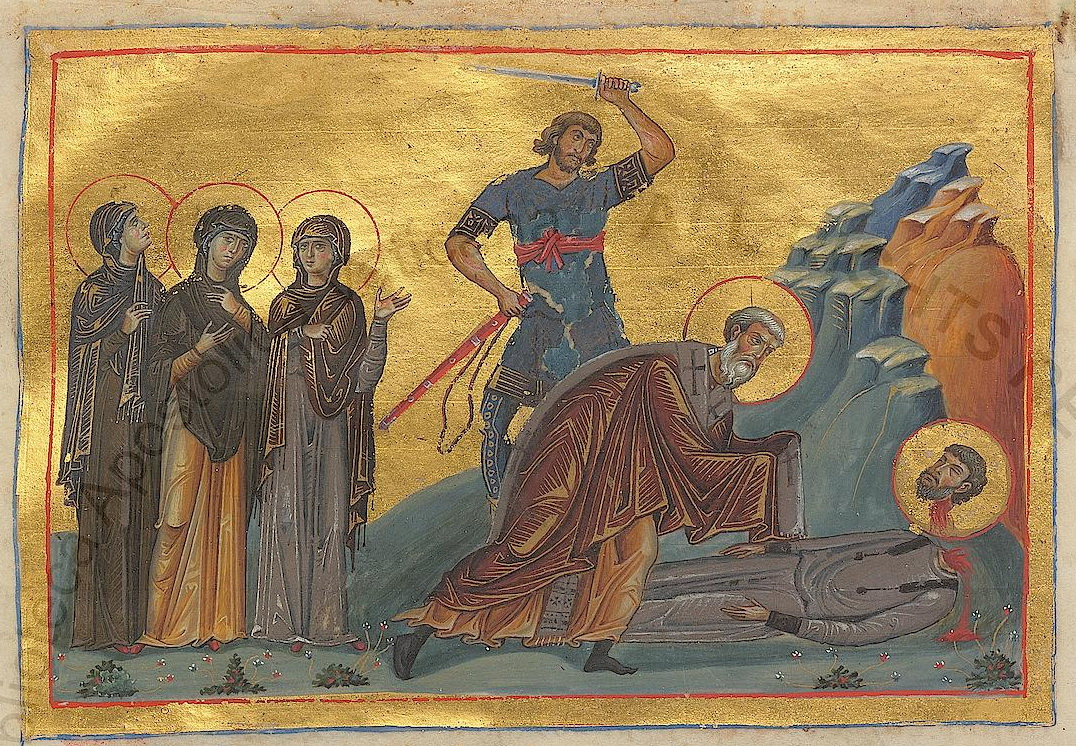
Hieromartyr Alexander, Bishop, and Martyrs Heraclius, Anna, Elizabeth, Theodota, and Glyceria, at Adrianople.
(Menologion of Basil II, 10th century).

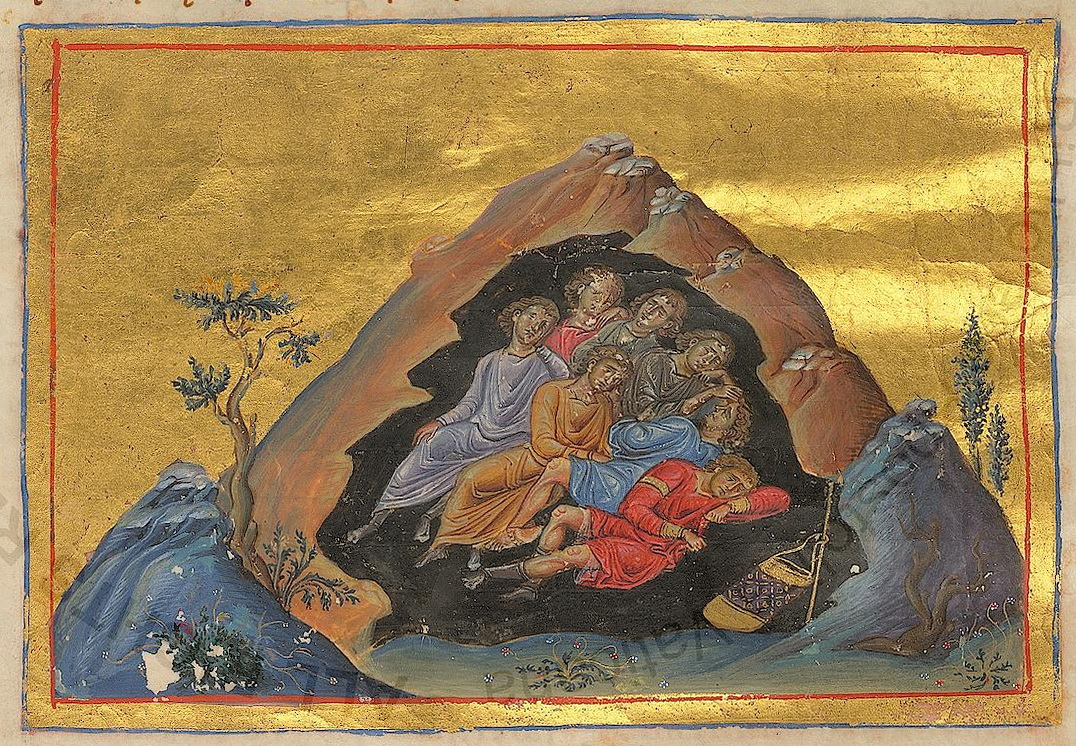
The Holy Seven Youths ("Seven Sleepers") of Ephesus.
(Menologion of Basil II, 10th century).

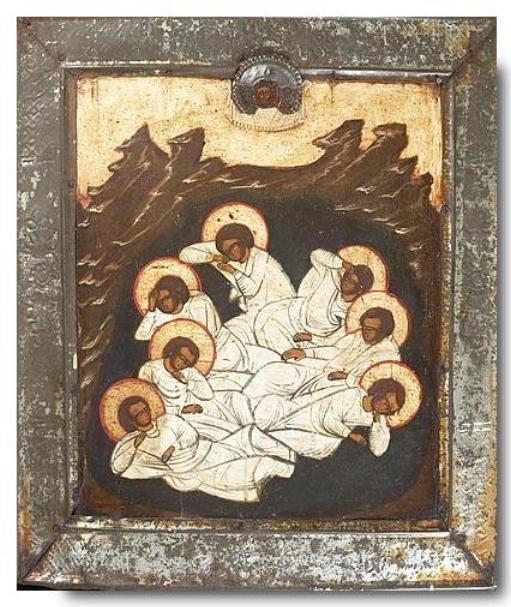
The Holy Seven Youths ("Seven Sleepers") of Ephesus.

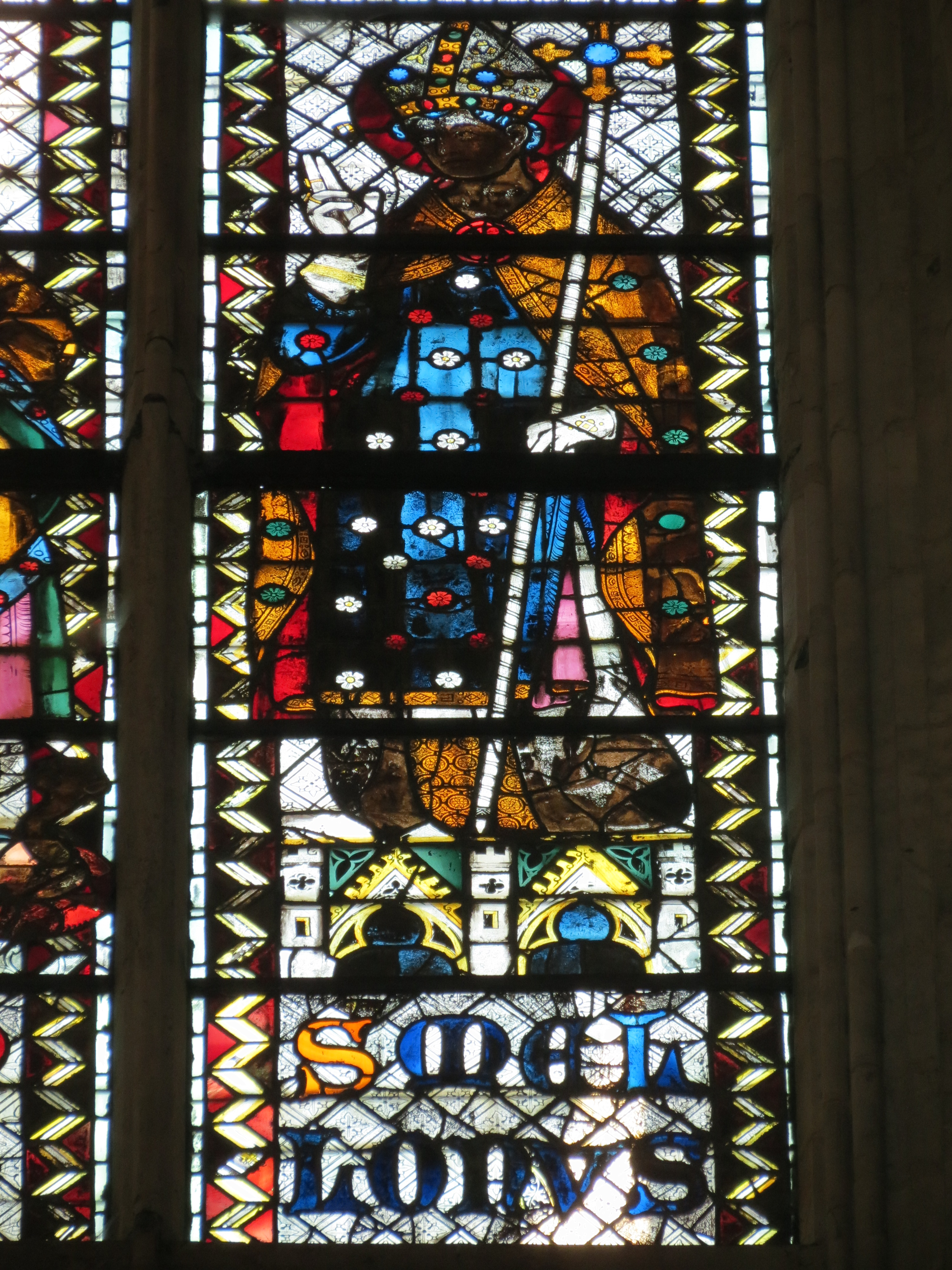
St. Mellonius, first Bishop of Rouen.

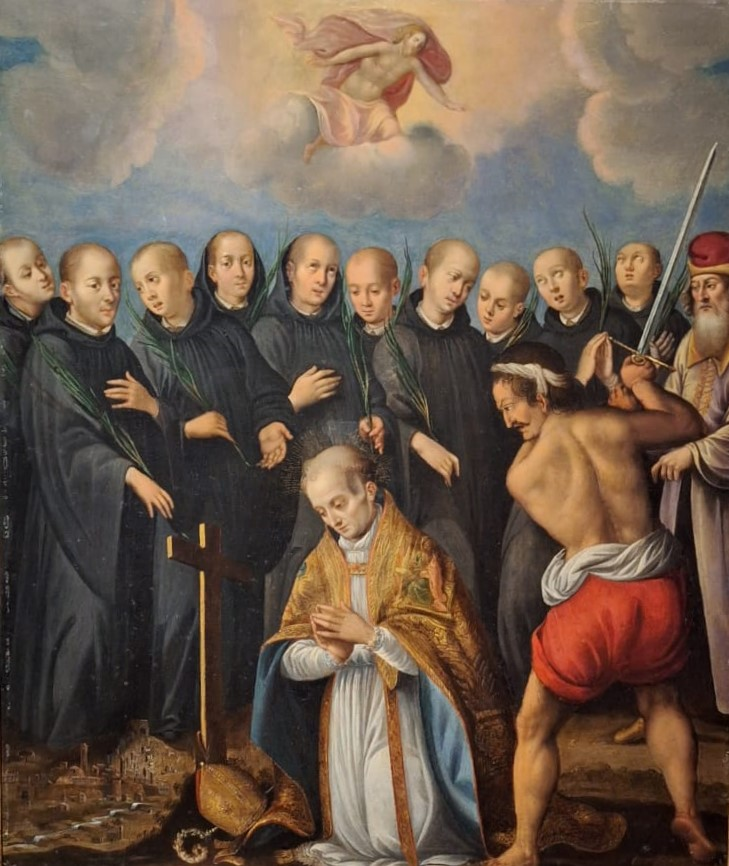
Martyrdom of St. Bertharius, Benedictine abbot of Monte Cassino.

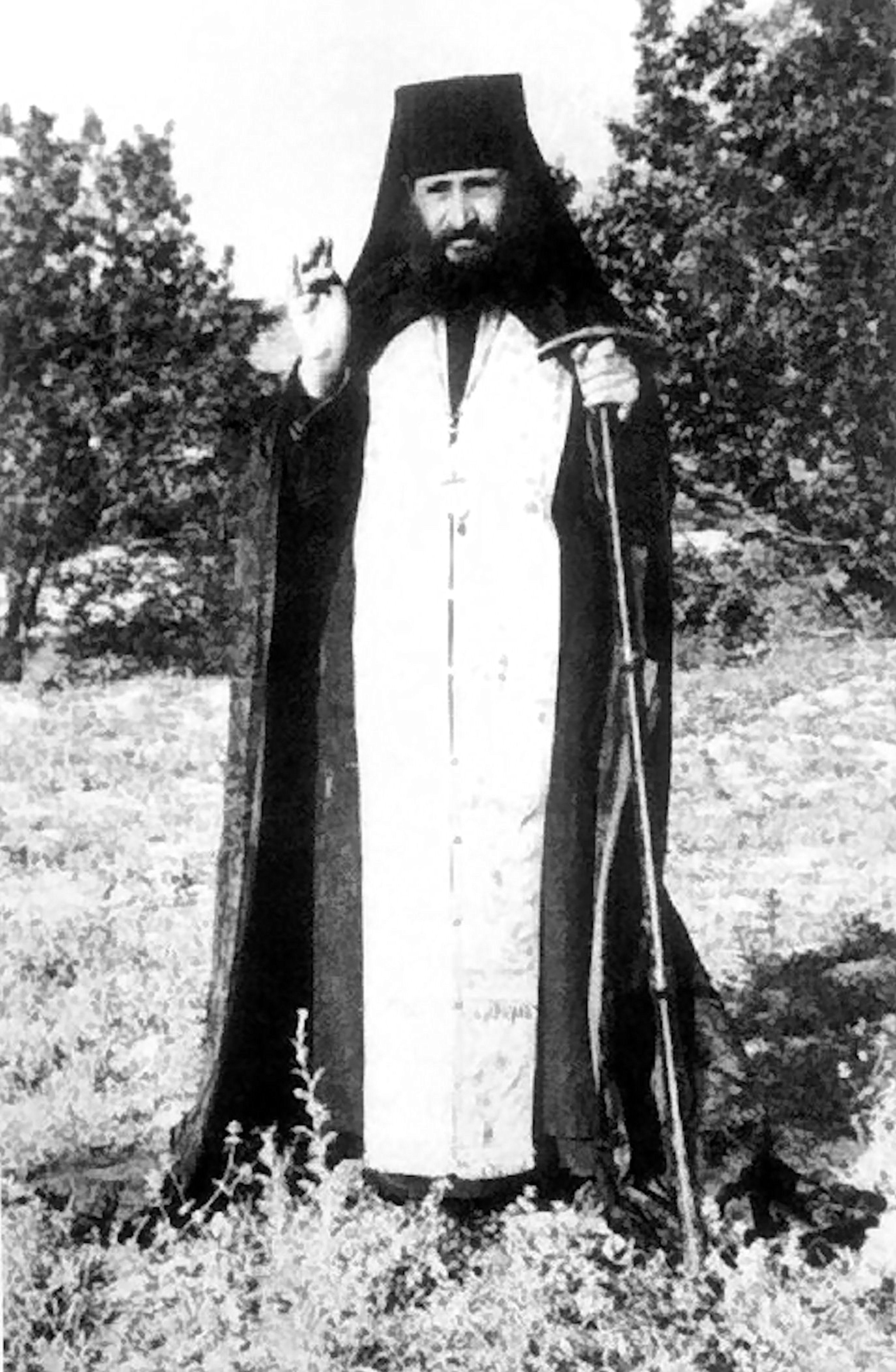
St. George (Karslidis) of Drama, Greece.

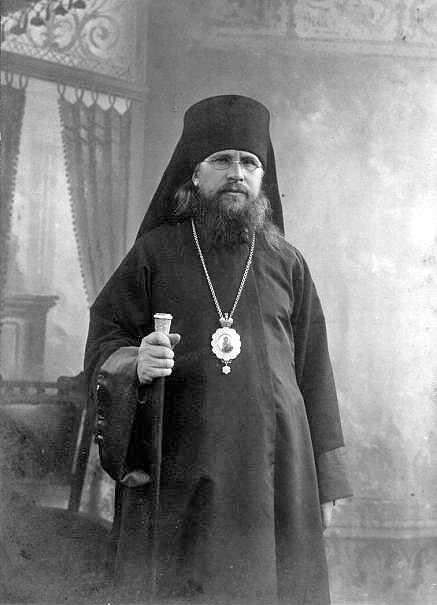
New Hieromartyr Seraphim (Samoilovich), Archbishop of Uglich.

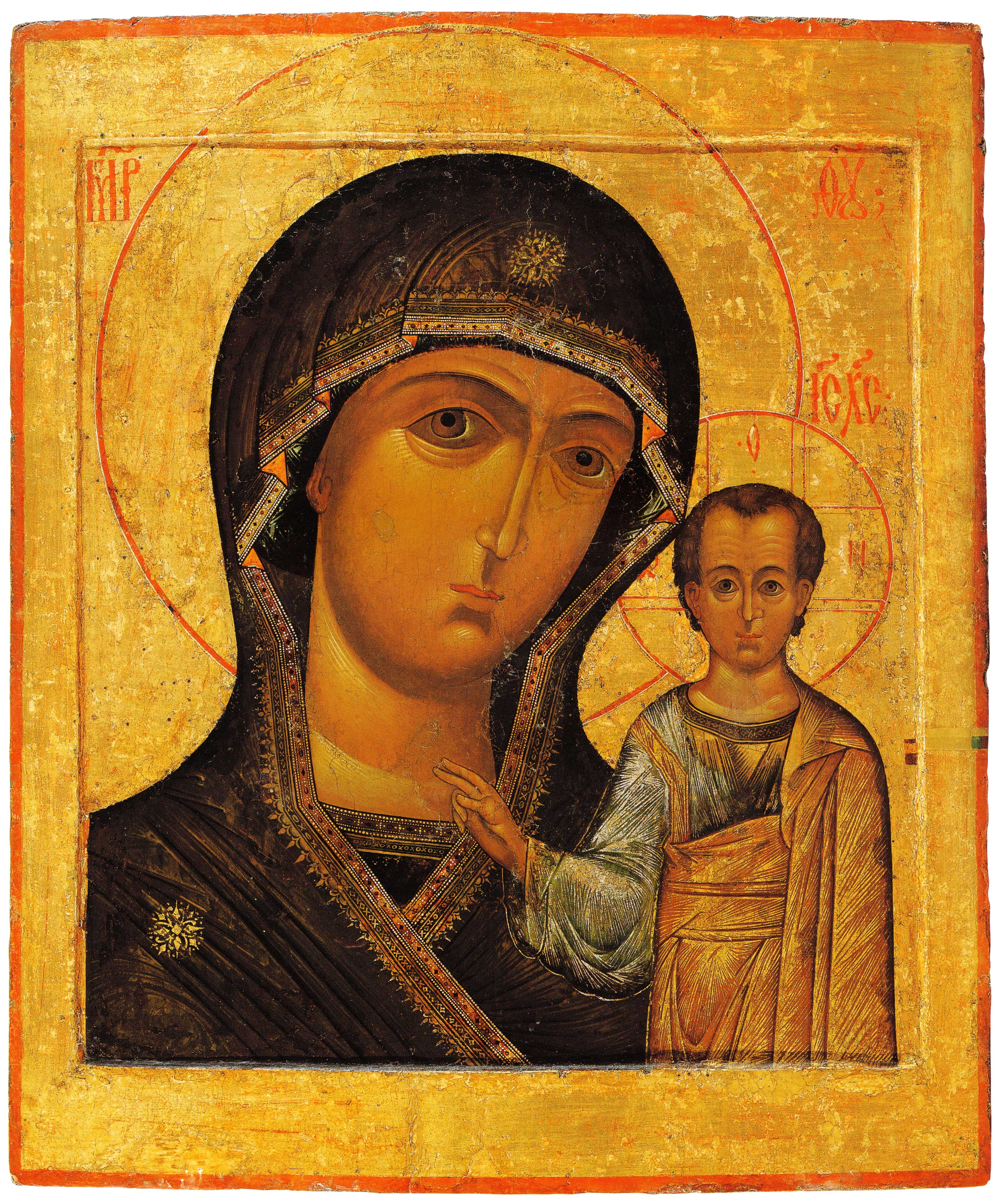
Kazan Icon of the Most Holy Theotokos.

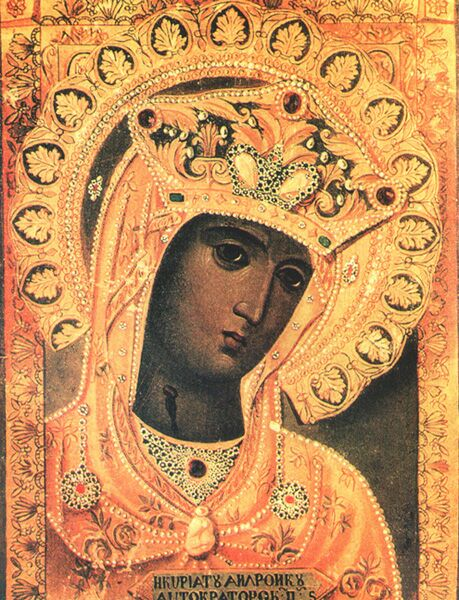
Icon of the Mother of God of Andronicus.

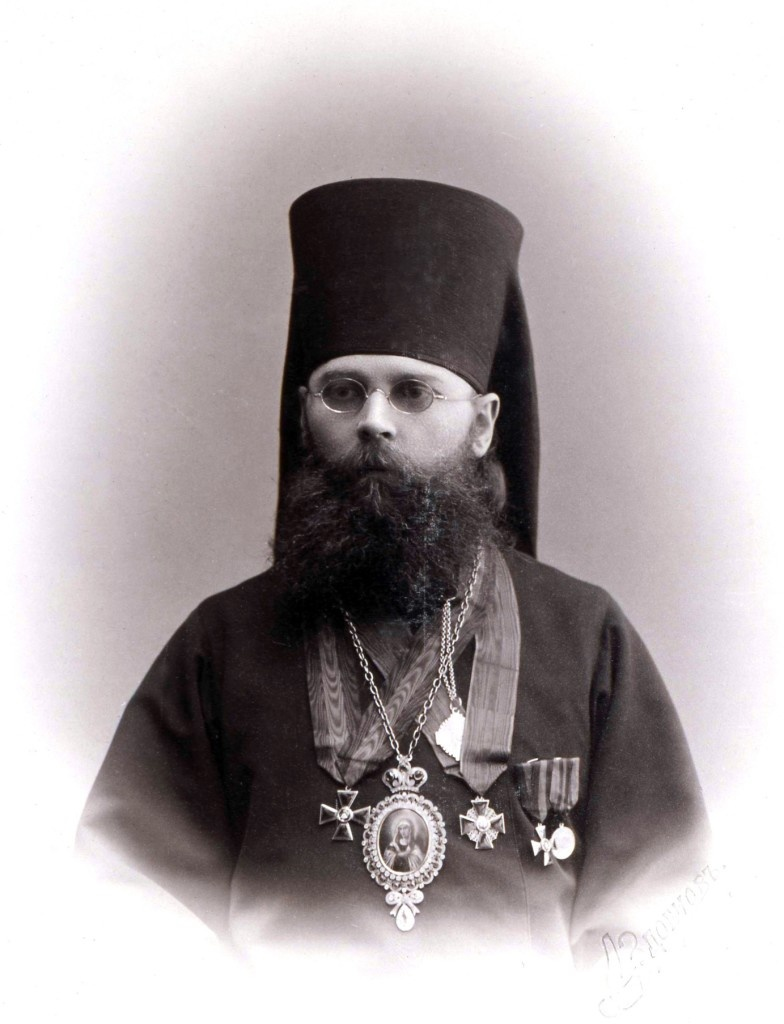
New Hieromartyr Nikodim (Kononov), Bishop of Belgorod.

== Sources ==
- October 22 / November 4. Orthodox Calendar (PRAVOSLAVIE.RU).
- November 4 / October 22. HOLY TRINITY RUSSIAN ORTHODOX CHURCH (A parish of the Patriarchate of Moscow).
- October 22. OCA - The Lives of the Saints.
- The Autonomous Orthodox Metropolia of Western Europe and the Americas (ROCOR). St. Hilarion Calendar of Saints for the year of our Lord 2004. St. Hilarion Press (Austin, TX). p. 79.
- The Twenty-Second Day of the Month of October. Orthodoxy in China.
- October 22. Latin Saints of the Orthodox Patriarchate of Rome.
- The Roman Martyrology. Transl. by the Archbishop of Baltimore. Last Edition, According to the Copy Printed at Rome in 1914. Revised Edition, with the Imprimatur of His Eminence Cardinal Gibbons. Baltimore: John Murphy Company, 1916. pp. 325–326.
- Rev. Richard Stanton. A Menology of England and Wales, or, Brief Memorials of the Ancient British and English Saints Arranged According to the Calendar, Together with the Martyrs of the 16th and 17th Centuries. London: Burns & Oates, 1892. pp. 510–511.

Greek Sources

- Great Synaxaristes: (in Greek) 22 ΟΚΤΩΒΡΙΟΥ. ΜΕΓΑΣ ΣΥΝΑΞΑΡΙΣΤΗΣ.
- (in Greek) Συναξαριστής. 22 Οκτωβρίου. ECCLESIA.GR. (H ΕΚΚΛΗΣΙΑ ΤΗΣ ΕΛΛΑΔΟΣ).
- (in Greek) 22/10/2017. Ορθόδοξος Συναξαριστής.

Russian Sources

- (in Russian) 4 ноября (22 октября). Православная Энциклопедия под редакцией Патриарха Московского и всея Руси Кирилла (электронная версия). (Orthodox Encyclopedia - Pravenc.ru).
- (in Russian) 22 октября по старому стилю / 4 ноября по новому стилю. Русская Православная Церковь - Православный церковный календарь на 2016 год.
