= Levitation of saints =

Saints to whom the ability to fly or levitate has been attributed

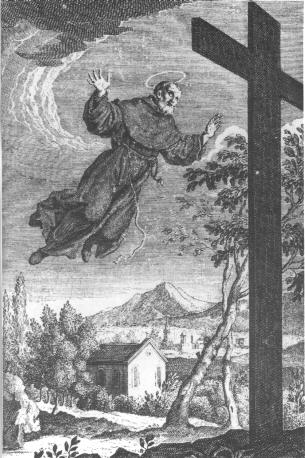
Joseph of Cupertino is believed to have had the capability to levitate.

The levitation of saints is the ability attributed to a saint to fly or to levitate. Most of these "flying saints" are mentioned as such in literature and sources associated with them. Various religions have claimed examples of levitation amongst their followers. This is generally used either as a demonstration of the validity or power of the religion, or as evidence of the holiness or adherence to the religion of the particular levitator.

== Buddhism ==
- It is recounted as one of the Miracles of Buddha that Gautama Buddha walked on water levitating (crossed legs) over a stream in order to convert a brahmin to Buddhism.
- Yogi Milarepa, a Vajrayana Buddhist guru, was rumored to have possessed a range of additional abilities during levitation, such as the ability to walk, rest and sleep; however, such were deemed as occult powers.

== Gnosticism ==
- Simon Magus, a Gnostic who claimed to be an incarnation of God (as conceived by the Gnostics), reportedly had the ability to levitate, along with many other magical powers.
- Mani, founder of Manichaeism, was reputed to be able to levitate.

== Hellenism ==
- It was believed in Hellenism (the pagan religion of Ancient Greece and Ancient Rome) on the testimony of Philostratus that upon his death, Apollonius of Tyana underwent heavenly assumption by levitating into Elysium.

== Christianity ==
The ability to levitate was attributed to figures in Early Christianity. The apocryphal Acts of Peter gives a legendary tale of Simon Magus' death. Simon is performing magic in the Roman Forum, and in order to prove himself to be a god, he flies up into the air. The apostle Peter prays to God to stop his flying, and he stops mid-air and falls, breaking his legs, whereupon the crowd, previously non-hostile, stones him to death.

The church of Santa Francesca Romana claims to have been built on the spot in question (thus accepting the claim that Simon Magus could indeed fly), claims that Paul was also present, and that a dented slab of marble that it contains bears the imprints of the knees of Peter and Paul during their prayer.

- According to three gospels, Jesus walked on the water of Lake Galilee to meet his disciples who were in a boat.
- Saint Mary of Egypt (c. 344 – c. 421), walked across the river Jordan according to her hagiographer, the hermit Zosimas of Palestine
- Saint Bessarion of Egypt (died c. 466), is said to have walked across the waters of the river Nile
- Francis of Assisi (c. 1182 – 1226), founder of the Franciscan Order, is recorded as having been "suspended above the earth, often to a height of three, and often to a height of four cubits". This is about 1.3 to 1.8 m (4 ft 3 in – 5 ft 11 in).
- Saint Catherine of Siena (1347–1380), a nun of the Third Order of Saint Dominic and Doctor of the Church, was said to have levitated while in prayer, and a priest claimed to have seen the Holy Communion's Eucharist wafer flying from his hand straight to Catherine's hand.
- Teresa of Ávila (1515–1582), a Carmelite nun and Doctor of the Church, claimed to have levitated at a height of about a 1.5 feet (0.46 m) for an extended period somewhat less than an hour, in a state of mystical rapture. She called the experience a "spiritual visitation".
- Saint Martín de Porres (1579–1639), a lay brother of the Dominican Order, claimed psychic powers of bilocation, being able to pass through closed doors (teleportation), and levitation.
- Joseph of Cupertino (1603–1663), a Franciscan Friar, reportedly levitated high in the air, for extended periods of more than an hour, on many occasions.
- Alphonsus Liguori (1696–1787), when preaching at Foggia, was purportedly lifted before the eyes of the whole congregation several feet from the ground.
- Girolamo Savonarola, sentenced to death, allegedly rose off the floor of his cell into midair and remained there for some time.
- Seraphim of Sarov (1759–1833), Russian Orthodox saint, allegedly had a gift to levitate over the ground for some time, witnessed by many educated people of his time, including the emperor Alexander I of Russia.
- Mariam Baouardy (Arabic: مريم بواردي; or "Mary of Jesus Crucified", 1846–1878), a Discalced Carmelite nun of the Melkite Greek Catholic Church, experienced frequent ecstasies. She was purportedly seen levitating more than once by others: for example, in the garden of the monastery during times of private prayer, when living in the Carmelite monastery at Pau, in France.

"Demonic" levitation in Christianity

- Simon Magus is recorded in the Acts of Peter as levitating above the Forum in Rome in order to prove himself to be a god. The apostle Peter intervenes, causing Magus to drop from the sky, breaking his legs "in three parts".
- Clara Germana Cele, a young South African girl, in 1906 reportedly levitated in a rigid position. The effect was apparently only reversed by the application of Holy water, leading to belief that it was caused by demonic possession.
- Magdalena de la Cruz (1487–1560), a Franciscan nun of Cordova, Spain.
- Margaret Rule, a young Boston girl in the 1690s who was believed to be harassed by evil forces shortly after the Salem Witchcraft Trials, reportedly levitated from her bed in the presence of a number of witnesses.

=== Orthodoxy ===
In recent times, John of Shanghai and San Francisco was said to be levitating while in prayer; an individual witnessed this when checking in on him while he was in prayer. George of Drama was also seen levitating during the Divine Liturgy.

=== Catholicism ===
Francis of Assisi is recorded as having been "suspended above the earth, often to a height of three, and often to a height of four cubits" (around 1.3 to 1.8 m). Alphonsus Liguori, when preaching at Foggia, was lifted before the eyes of the whole congregation several feet from the ground. Catherine of Siena was similarly said to be levitating while in prayer, and a priest claimed to have seen the Holy communion flying from his hand straight to Catherine's mouth.

Flying or levitation was also associated with witchcraft. When it came to female saints, there was a certain ambivalence expressed by theologians, canon lawyers, inquisitors, and hagiographers towards the powers that they were purported to have. By 1500, the image of the female saint in popular imagination had become similar to that of the witch. Both witches and female saints were suspected of flying through the air, whether in saintly levitation or bilocation, or in a Witches' Sabbath.

== Islam ==
Levitation is a practice often described in Islamic literature from antiquity until well into the medieval era. Revered prophets and Islamic saints are said to have flown. Those named as capable of "flight" have included the Islamic prophet Muhammed, the twelfth century Persian dervish, Qutb ad-Dīn Haydar and the ninth century Muslim saint Abu Yazid al-Bestami.

== Hinduism ==
Levitation has also been cited outside of Islam and Christianity. In his book Autobiography of a Yogi, Paramahamsa Yogananda discusses Nagendranath Bhaduri, a saint said to levitate in India. Nagendranath Bhaduri – Bhaduri Mahasaya served as an Acharya of the Baluhati branch of the Adi Brahmo Samaj. However, due to differences with Debendranath Tagore, Nagendranath Bhaduri eventually broke off his connection with the Adi Brahmo Samaj. He met Sri Ramakrishna at Dakshineswar in 1881 while serving as the Headmaster of Bally English High School. Bhaduri Mahasaya – Maharshi Nagendranath pursued intense spiritual practices in solitude, especially Hathayoga and Pranayam, in a lonely cave in Monghyr and attained salvation there. The saint had mastered Astanga Yoga and several Yogic techniques including various pranayamas or breathing techniques as mentioned in Patanjali's Yoga Sutra. Yogananda wrote that Nagendranath Bhaduri had performed bhastrika pranayama so strongly that he felt like he was in the middle of a storm and after performing the pranayama, Bhaduri Mahasaya entered into a state of ecstatic calm. The chapter which describes Bhaduri Mahasaya is titled "The Levitating Saint".

- In Hinduism, it is believed that some Hindu mystics and gurus who have achieved certain spiritual powers (called siddhis) are able to levitate. In Sanskrit, the power of levitation is called laghiman ('lightness') or dardura-siddhi (the 'frog power'). Yogananda's book Autobiography of a Yogi has accounts of Hindu Yogis who levitated in the course of their meditation.
- Yogi Subbayah Pullavar was reported to have levitated into the air for four minutes in front of a crowd of 150 witnesses on June 6, 1936. He was seen suspended horizontally several feet above the ground, in a trance, lightly resting his hand on top of a cloth-covered stick. Pullavar's arms and legs could not be bent from their locked position once on the ground. The illusion was created by a simple method in which the person seen to levitate is supported by a cantilevered platform held up by an iron rod camouflaged in some way.
