= Bertharius of Monte Cassino =

Italian Roman Catholic saint

Saint Bertharius
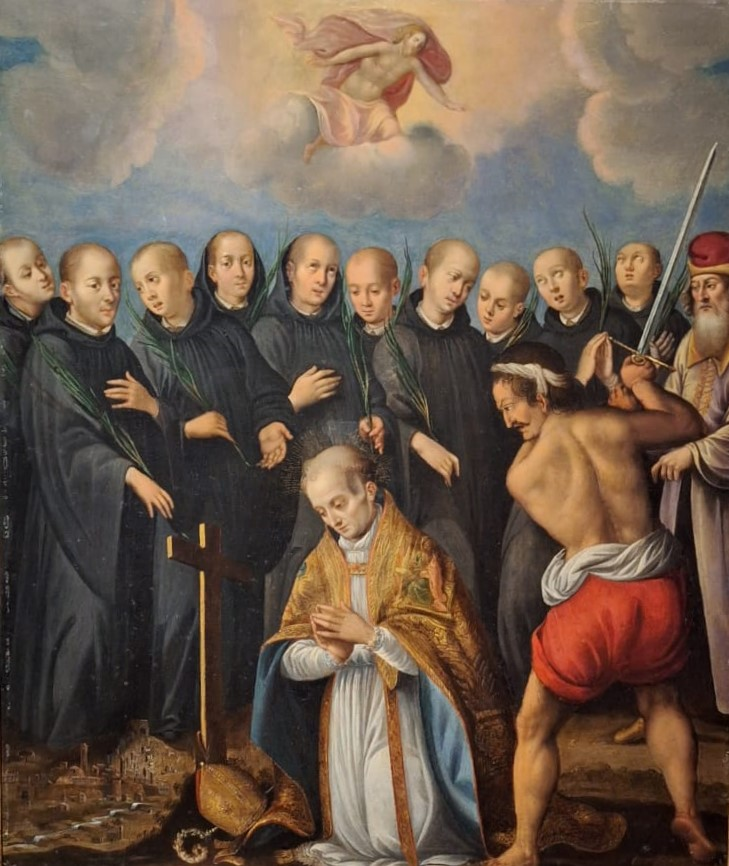
- Martyrdom of San Bertario

Abbot and Martyr
- Born: ~810
- Died: October 22, 883; Monte Cassino, Italy
- Venerated in: Roman Catholic Church; Eastern Orthodox Church
- Canonized: cult was confirmed on August 26, 1727 by Pope Benedict XIII
- Major shrine: Monte Cassino
- Feast: October 22
- Attributes: palm of martyrdom

Bertharius (Italian: San Bertario di Montecassino) (c. 810 – 883) was a Benedictine abbot of Monte Cassino who is venerated as a saint and martyr. A member of the Lombard nobility, Bertharius as a young man made a pilgrimage to Monte Cassino at the time of the abbacy of Bassacius and decided as a result to become a monk.

He became abbot in 856, succeeding Bassacius in that position. He became abbot at a critical time, in which Muslim incursions threatened central and southern Italy. The basilicas extra muros of Rome had been sacked in 846 AD.

Bertharius fortified the abbey with massive walls and towers between 856 and 873, while Louis II of Italy conducted various expeditions against the Muslim forces, beating them back temporarily.

Bertharius founded the city that he named Eulogimenopoli, later renamed San Germano, and today called Cassino. Bertharius promoted the study of texts and embellished the abbatial church with precious furnishings. He established a new monastery for women at Teano and maintained good relations with the city of Capua.

In 873, Muslim raids in Campania and Latium resumed, and a band of raiders paid by the Duke of Naples, Athanasius, established a base in the Apennines in 882. They burned the abbey of San Vincenzo al Volturno, killing some of the monks there, and on September 4, 882, raiders attacked Monte Cassino, burning and destroying it. Bertharius and the monks managed to escape, finding refuge at the foot of the mountain of Monte Cassino, in the monastery of San Salvatore. Angelarius, a prior of Monte Cassino, took most of the monks to Teano. However, Bertharius remained at Monte Cassino.

In 883, the monastery was again attacked, and Bertharius was killed along with some other monks at the altar of St. Martin on October 22 of that year in the church of Saint Salvator at the foot of the hill.

Bertharius was succeeded by Angelarius, who rebuilt the church of St. Salvator (later named St. Germanus).

== Veneration ==
Bertharius’ body was immediately translated to Monte Cassino and in 1486 moved to the abbatial church there, in front of the tombs of Saints Benedict and Scholastica. In 1514, a chapel was dedicated in his honor; his body was placed under the altar. Various artistic depictions of Bertharius were made during succeeding centuries, but these were lost during the Battle of Monte Cassino in World War II. His cult was confirmed on August 26, 1727, by Pope Benedict XIII.

He is also venerated in the Eastern Orthodox Church, his feast day being October 22.
