= Amandus of Bordeaux =

5th-century bishop and Catholic saint

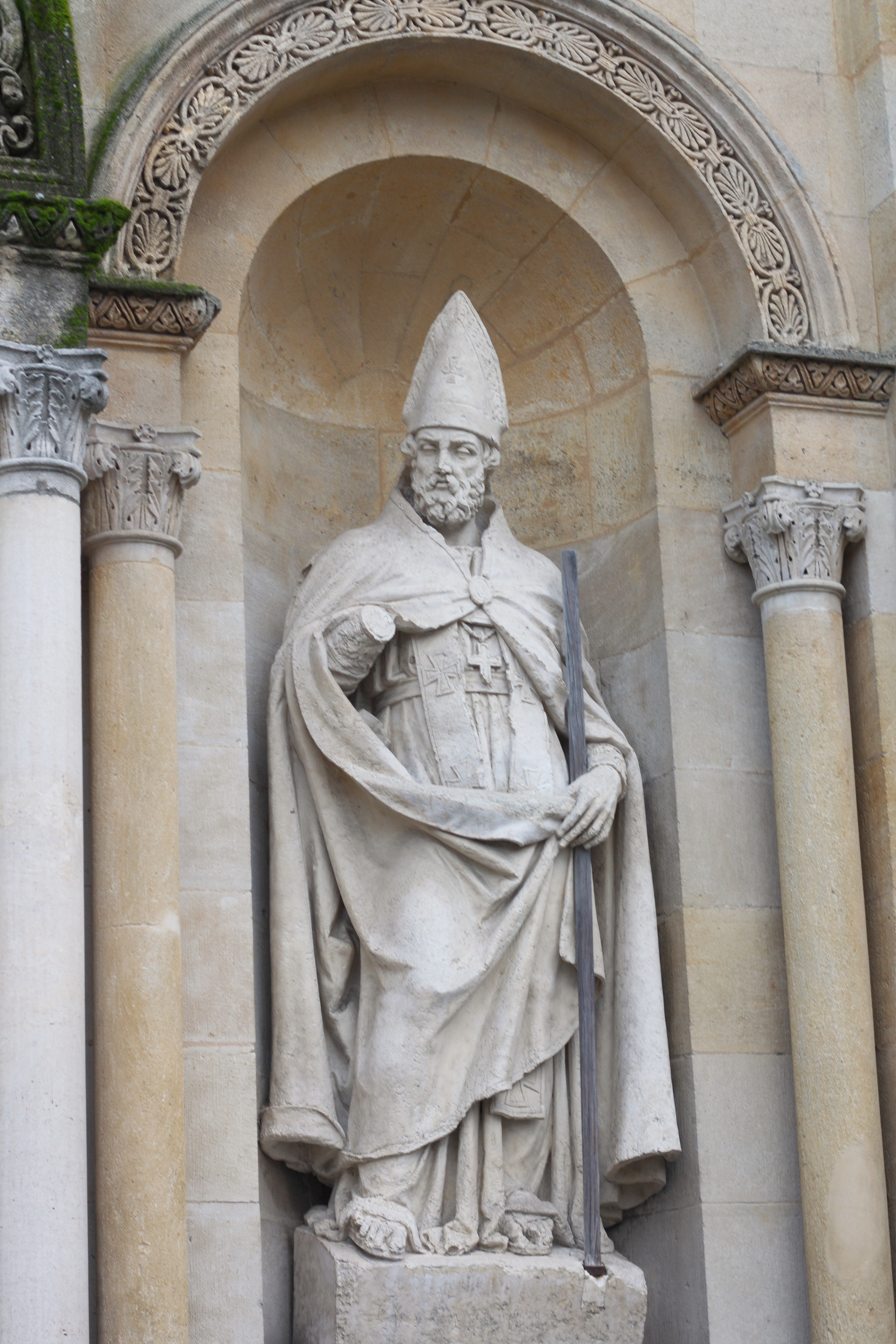
St. Amandus' statue.

Amandus de Bordeaux (died c. 431) was the bishop of Bordeaux for two non-consecutive periods between about 404 and 431.

== Biography ==
Amandus was raised in a Christian home and educated in the Christian Bible. Recognizing his qualities, Bishop Delphinus had him ordained a priest. He was the priest who prepared Paulinus for baptism by Delphinus in 389. He wrote a consolatio to Paulinus, then living in Italy, on the death of the latter's brother. Paulinus' response survives. In another letter, Paulinus reproves Amandus for having exaggerated Paulinus' literary skills to the point where Delphinus was requesting Paulinus write him a letter. The earliest collection of Paulinus' letters contains six to Amandus. Amandus may also have corresponded with Jerome.

Amandus succeeded Delphinus as bishop of Bordeaux around 404. When his health began to fail, he urged the people to elect a replacement. He was succeeded by Severinus, who had already served as bishop of Trier. When Severinus died not long after in 420, Amandus resumed the bishopric. These events are known through the letters of Paulinus.

== Veneration ==
Amandus is venerated as a saint and his feast day is 18 June in the Catholic Church. He is listed in the revised Roman Martyrology (2004), but not the revised General Roman Calendar (1969).

== Bibliography ==
- Bangley, Bernard (2005). Butler's Lives of the Saints: Concise, Modernized Edition. Paraclete press.
- Conybeare, Catherine (2000). Paulinus Noster: Self and Symbols in the Letters of Paulinus of Nola. Oxford University Press.
- Farmer, David Hugh (2011). The Oxford Dictionary of Saints (5th rev. ed.). Oxford University Press.
- Trout, D. E. (1991). "The Dates of the Ordination of Paulinus of Bordeaux and of His Departure for Nola". Revue d'Études Augustiniennes et Patristiques. 37 (2): 237–260. doi:10.1484/j.rea.5.104642.
- Watkins, Basil (2016). The Book of Saints: A Comprehensive Biographical Dictionary (8th rev. ed.). Bloomsbury.
