= Eberigisil =

6th-century Bishop of Cologne

- Died: End of 6th century
- Occupation: Bishop of Cologne

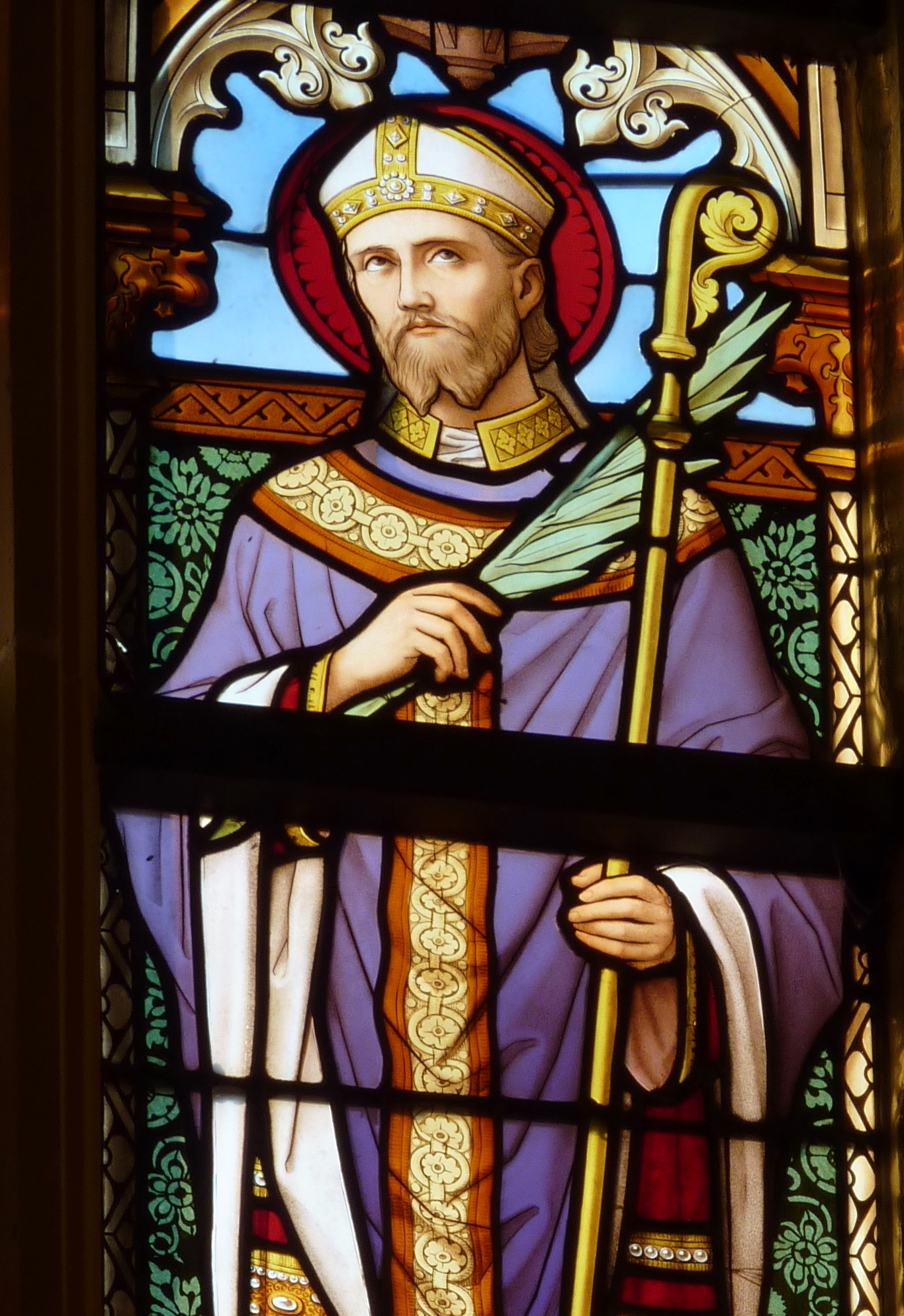
Eberigisil

Eberigisil (Note: Ebergisel, Ebergisil, Ebregisel, Ebregisil, Ebregislus, Ebregiselus, Ebregisus, Evergislus, Evergisilus, Everigisil, Everigisilus) (died before 593) was Bishop of Cologne, being the fifth well-attested bishop, and the first with a Frankish name. Evergislu's tenure was marked by the unrest brought about by the migration of peoples, which dominated both city and country. Evergislus tried to build up religious life and ecclesiastical peace.

== Life ==
He is mentioned by Gregory of Tours but always using the past tense, so it is assumed that Eberigisil died before 594. Gregory says that Eberigisil built a church in honor of the martyr Mallosus in Birten, near Xanten. In 590 he settled disputes in a nunnery in Poitiers on behalf of Childebert II.

Heriger of Lobbes mentions him as a bishop of Maastricht but this may well be a mix up.

== Legend ==
According to an 11th-century legend, Eberigisil came from a wealthy family in the Flemish town of Tongeren. When Bishop Severin of Cologne was visiting there (Tongern belonged to the Cologne ecclesiastical province at the time), he took the boy, who was considered pious, with him to the episcopal city on the Rhine, educated him and ordained him a deacon. When Severin died, Evergislus became his successor. On a later visit to his hometown of Tongeren, he is said to have been murdered by robbers and buried in the local Church of Our Lady. From a historical point of view, however, this narrative is not possible, since Severin was bishop of Cologne around 397.

== Veneration ==
In 954 Archbishop Bruno I transferred the supposed relics of Evergisilus« from Tongeren to St. Cecilia's Church, Cologne. Eberigisil was a co-patron of St. Cecilia's Church, which is now a museum. Today his relics rest in the nearby parish church of St. Peter.

He is revered as a Catholic saint, honoured on 24 October, and is the patron saint of glaziers, and glass painters.

The parish church in Brenig is dedicated to St. Evergislus.

Eberigisil is often depicted in episcopal regalia with a palm leaf.

== Sources ==
- Régis de la Haye, De bisschoppen van Maastricht. Maastricht, 1985
