= October 24 (Eastern Orthodox liturgics) =

Day in the Eastern Orthodox liturgical calendar

Eastern Orthodox liturgical calendar
October 23	October 24	October 25
October 24 O.S. ≍ November 6 N.S. October 24 N.S ≍ October 11 O.S.

An Eastern Orthodox cross

October 24 in Eastern Orthodox liturgical calendars is a feast day and a day of commemoration of saints and martyrs. Although some Orthodox churches use the Revised Julian Calendar and others use the traditional Julian calendar, the fixed commemorations for their respective October 24 are broadly the same, no matter which calendar is used. (Note: Despite the dates being the same, the days to which they refer typically differ by 13 days. The notation Old Style or O.S. is sometimes used to indicate a date in the traditional Julian Calendar (the "Old Calendar"). The notation New Style or N.S. indicates a date in the Revised Julian calendar (the "New Calendar").)

== Saints ==
- Martyr Sebastiani (1st century) (Note: Saint Sebastiani came from the city of Sebaste in Phrygia and learned the Christian faith from the Apostle Paul. She witnessed the faith in Marcianopolis in Thracia. Under severe tortures she continued to confess Christ. Finally she was beheaded, and was buried in Rhaedestus.)
- Martyrs Mark, Soterichos and Valentina, from Asia Minor, by being dragged over sharp stones. (Note: Their holy relics were translated to the island of Thasos, where they remain to this day.)
- Hieromartyr Akakios the Presbyter, by the sword.
- Martyr Nerdonus, by fire.
- Saint Proclus of Constantinople, Archbishop of Constantinople (447) (Note: "At Constantinople, St. Proclus, bishop.") (Note: His feast day is on November 20. It is unclear why he is listed on this day.)
- Great-martyr Arethas of Omir and 4,299 martyrs with him, including Martyr Syncletica and her two daughters (523) (Note: "At Nagran, in Arabia Felix, the passion of the Saint Aretas and his companions, to the number of three hundred and forty, in the time of the emperor Justin, under the Jewish tyrant Dunaan.) (see also: November 24. (Note: According to antiquarian Sabine Baring-Gould: "[Ethiopic Kalendar on Nov. 24 and 26. But the Senkessar or Abyssinian Synaxarium, edited by Sapetus, on Nov. 22 and 24. In the 8th cent. S. Arethas occurs in the Constantinopolitan Menology on Oct. 24. So also Metaphrastes, and the Russian Kalendar. Menology of Basil; Ruthenian Kalendar. The Coptic Kalendar and the Sacred Kalendar of the monastery of S. Sabas near Jerusalem, drawn up by S. Sabas in 532. The Marble Kalendar of Naples of the 9th cent. The modern Roman Martyrology, however, on July 27 : "Among the Hemeritae the commemoration of the holy martyrs who were cast into the flames for the faith of Christ under the tyrant Dunaan." "))
- A holy woman martyr and her child, together with Martyr Arethas of Omir and his companions (523) (Note: "After them was burned alive a Christian woman, whose son, five years old, confessed Christ lisping, and as he could neither by caresses nor threats be stopped, he rushed into the fire in which his mother was burning.")
- Blessed Elesbaan (Caleb), King of Ethiopia (553-555) (Note: Western sources, including the Roman Martyrology, list him on October 27th: "In Ethiopia, St. Elesbaan, king, who, after having defeated the enemies of Christ and sent his royal diadem to Jerusalem, in the time of the emperor Justin, led a monastical life, as he had vowed, and went to his reward.")

== Pre-Schism Western saints ==
- Martyrs Felix (Africanus), Audactus (Adauctus), Januarius, Fortunatus and Septimus (303) (Note: Felix was a Bishop of Thibiuca in North Africa, martyred with others for refusing to deliver up the sacred books. He was one of the first victims of Diocletian.) (Note: "AT Venosa, in Basilicata, the birthday of the holy martyrs Felix, African bishop, Audactus and Januarius, priests, Fortunatus and Septimus, lectors. In the time of Diocletian, after having been a long time loaded with fetters, and imprisoned in Africa and Sicily by the governor Magdellian, as Felix refused absolutely to deliver the sacred books, according to the emperor's edict, they finally closed their lives by being beheaded.")
- Saint Evergislus (Ebregesilus, Eberigisil), a Bishop of Cologne in Germany, martyred by heathen robbers (5th century) (Note: "At Cologne, St. Evergistus, bishop and martyr.")
- Saint Maglorius of Sark (Maelor), Bishop of Dol-de-Bretagne in Brittany (575) (Note: Maglorius was born in south Wales but went to Brittany with St Samson. Here they became abbots of two monasteries, St Samson at Dol and St Maglorius at Lammeur. St Samson became Bishop of Dol and on his repose was succeeded by St Maglorius, who finally crossed to the Channel Islands and built a monastery on Sark where he reposed.) (Note: "In Bretagne, the departure from this life of St. Maglorious, bishop, whose body rests at Paris.")
- Saint Senoch the Healer, Abbot, of Tours, Gaul (576)
- Saint Cadfarch, a disciple of St Iltyd, he founded churches in Penegoes and Abererch in Wales (6th century) (Note: "S. Cadfarch, brother of S. Thangwn and of S. Maehtlu, was the son of Caradoc Vreichvras, and grandson of Llyr Merini. He is said to have founded a church at Penegos, after having studied and received the monastic habit under S. Iltyt. He founded another church at Abererch.)
- Saint Martin of Vertou, founder of the monastery of Vertou near Nantes, also of Saint-Jouin-de-Marnes and other monasteries (601)
- Saint Marcius (Mark, Martin), a hermit at Montecassino in Italy (c. 679) (Note: He lived in a cave on Mount Massicus (Mondragone) where he reposed.) (Note: "In Campania, St. Mark, solitary, whose renowned actions have been recorded by St. Gregory.")
- Saint Fromundus (Frodemundus), Monk, Abbot and then Bishop of Coutances in France (c. 690)

== Post-Schism Orthodox saints ==
- Venerable Arethas, recluse, of the Kiev Caves (1190) (Note: See: (in Russian) Арефа Затворник. Википе́дия. (Russian Wikipedia).)
- Venerable Sisoes of the Kiev Caves (13th century)
- Venerable Theophilus the Silent, of the Kiev Caves (12th-13th century)
- Saint Athanasius I of Constantinople, Patriarch of Constantinople (1311) (see also: October 28)
- Saint John, recluse, of the Pskov Caves (1616)
- Venerable Zosima (Verkhovsky), Elder, of Siberia (1833) (Note: See: (in Russian) Зосима (Верховский). Википе́дия. (Russian Wikipedia).)
- Saint George the New Confessor, of Drama, Greece (1959) (see also: November 4 - Greek)

=== New Martys and Confessors ===
- New Hieromartyr Lawrence (Knyazev), Bishop of Balakhnin, (Note: See: (in Russian) Лаврентий (Князев). Википе́дия. (Russian Wikipedia).) and Alexis Porfiriev, Archpriest, (Note: See: (in Russian) Порфирьев, Алексей Александрович. Википе́дия. (Russian Wikipedia).) and with them New Martyr Alexis Neidhardt (Note: See: (in Russian) Нейдгардт, Алексей Борисович. Википе́дия. (Russian Wikipedia).) (1918)
- New Hieromartyr Arethas (Mitrenin), Hieromonk of Valaam (1932),
- New Hieromartyrs John Smirnov and Nicholas Nikolsky, Priests (1937)
- New Martyr Peter Bogorodsky, Priest (1938)

== Other commemorations ==
- Icon of the Most Holy Theotokos The "Joy of All Who Sorrow" (Moscow) (1688)
- Repose of Blessed Eudocia of Ryazan (1890)
- Repose of Hieroschemamonk Barsanuphius of Valaam (1910)

== Icon gallery ==
Martyrs Mark, Soterichos and Valentina, from Asia Minor, by being dragged over sharp stones.
(Menologion of Basil II, 10th century).

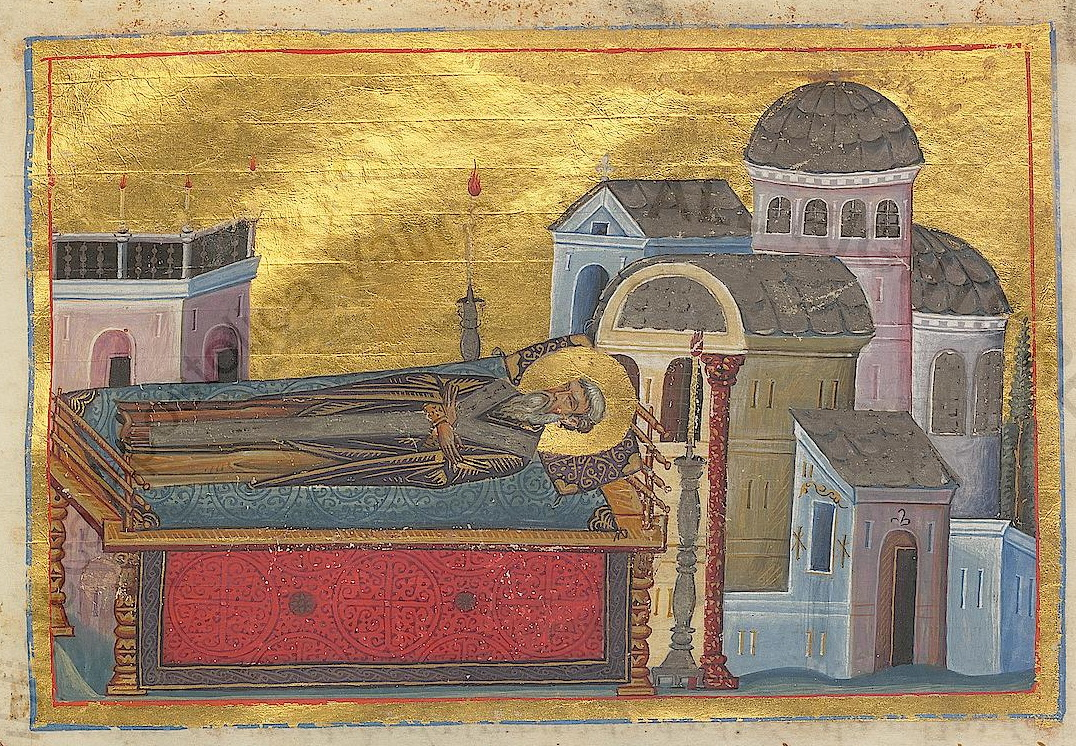
St. Proclus of Constantinople, Archbishop of Constantinople.
(Menologion of Basil II, 10th century).

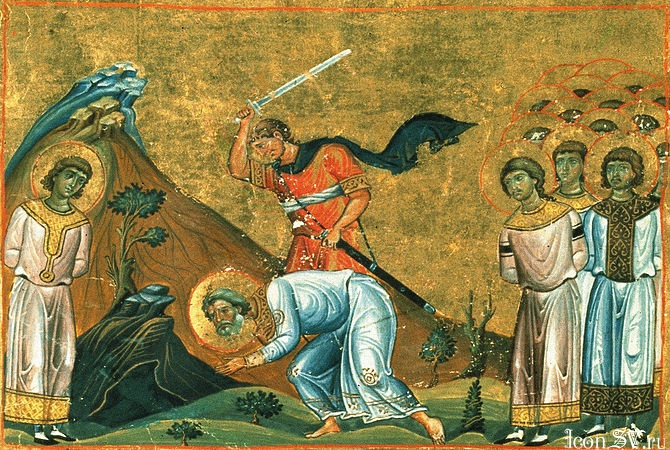
Great-martyr Arethas of Omir and 4,299 martyrs with him.
(Menologion of Basil II, 10th century).

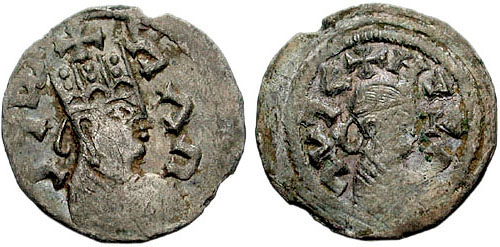
Coin of Blessed Elesbaan (Caleb), King of Ethiopia.

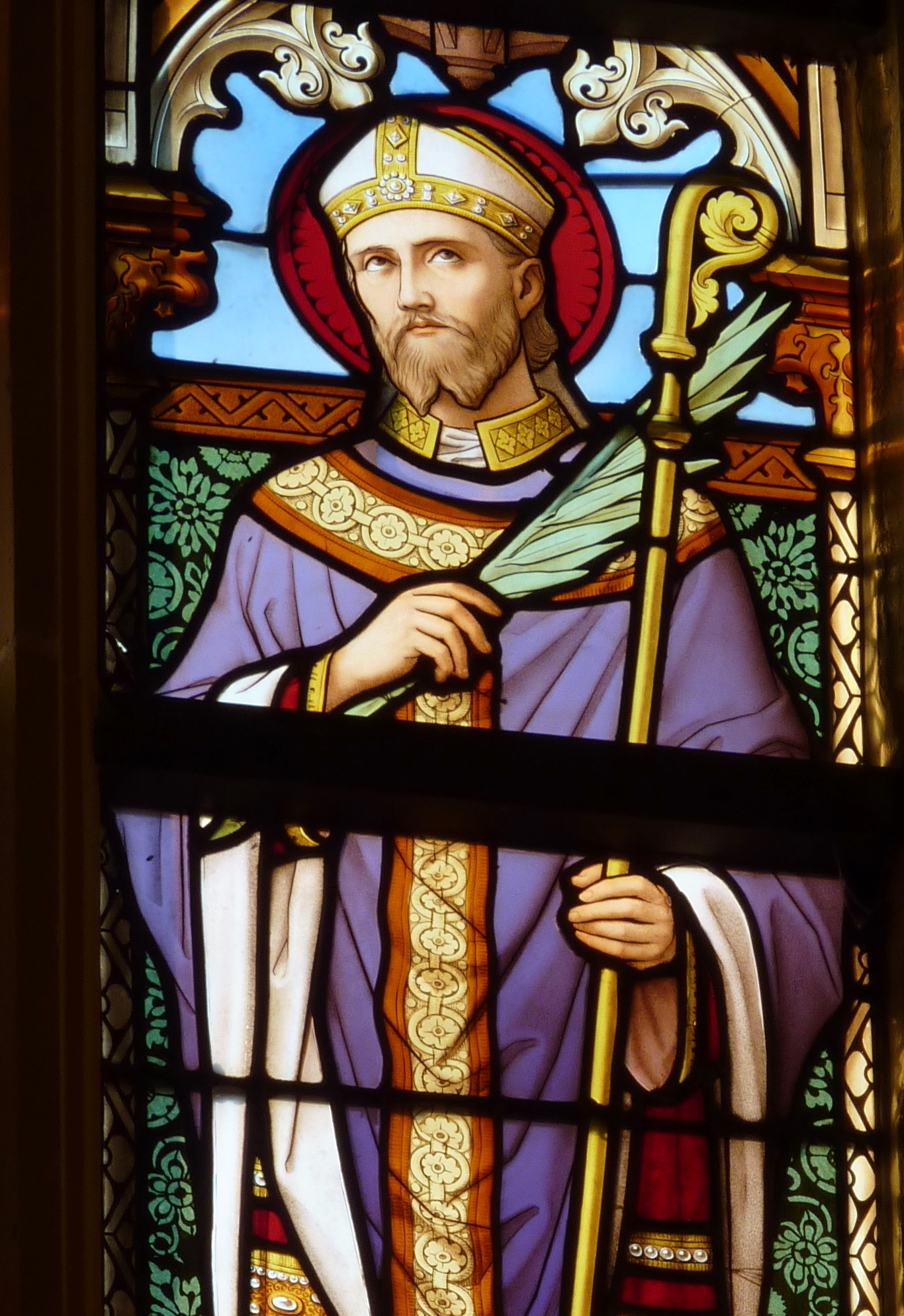
St. Evergislus, a Bishop of Cologne, martyred by robbers.

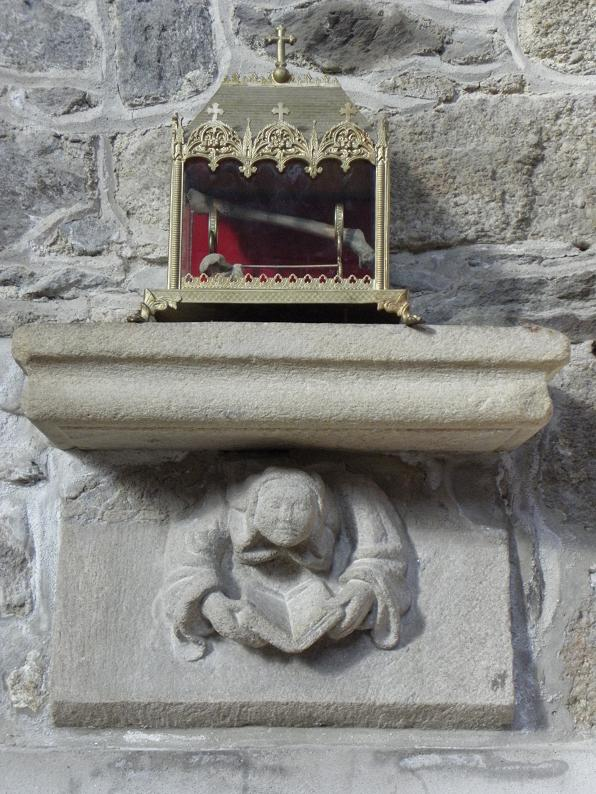
Relics of St. Maglorius of Sark (Maelor), Bishop of Dol-de-Bretagne.

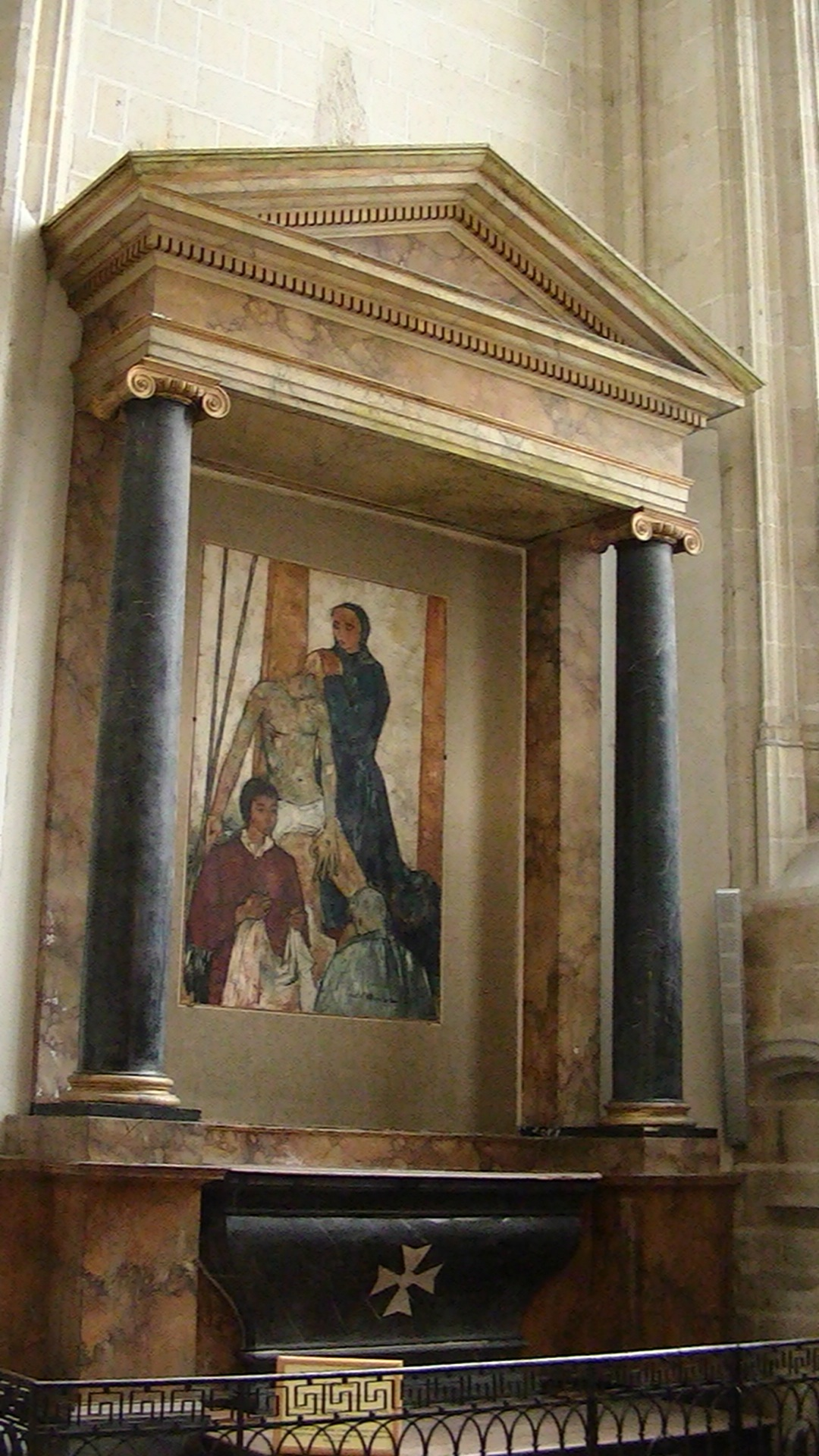
Chapel of St. Martin of Vertou, Cathédrale de Nantes.

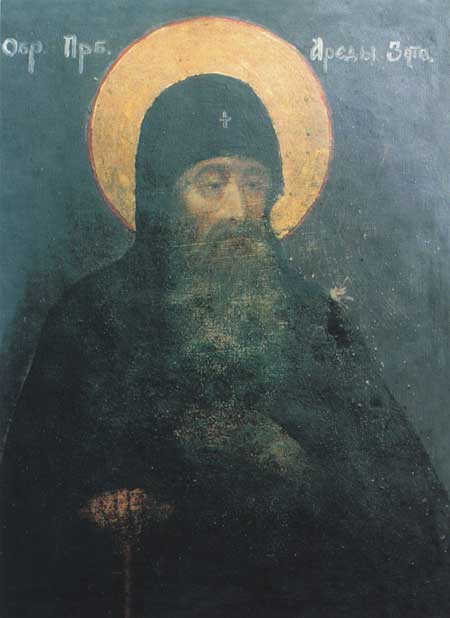
Venerable Arethas, recluse, of the Kiev Caves.

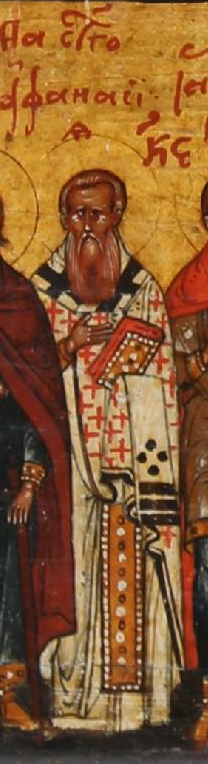
St. Athanasius I, Patriarch of Constantinople.

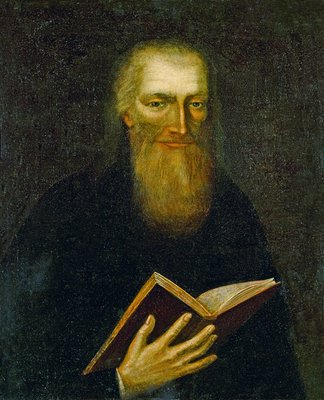
Venerable Zosima (Verkhovsky), Elder, of Siberia.

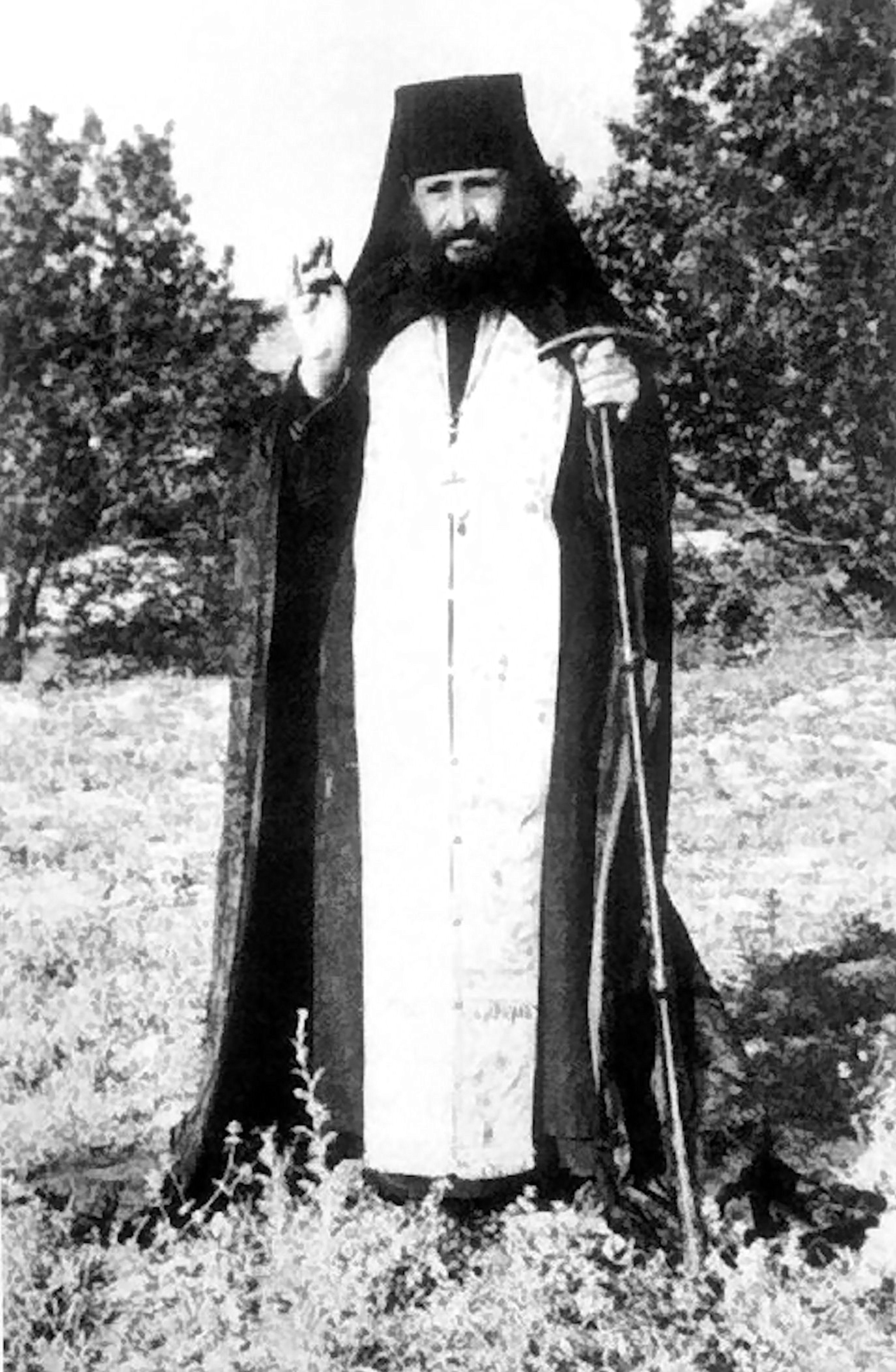
Venerable George (Karslidis) of Drama.

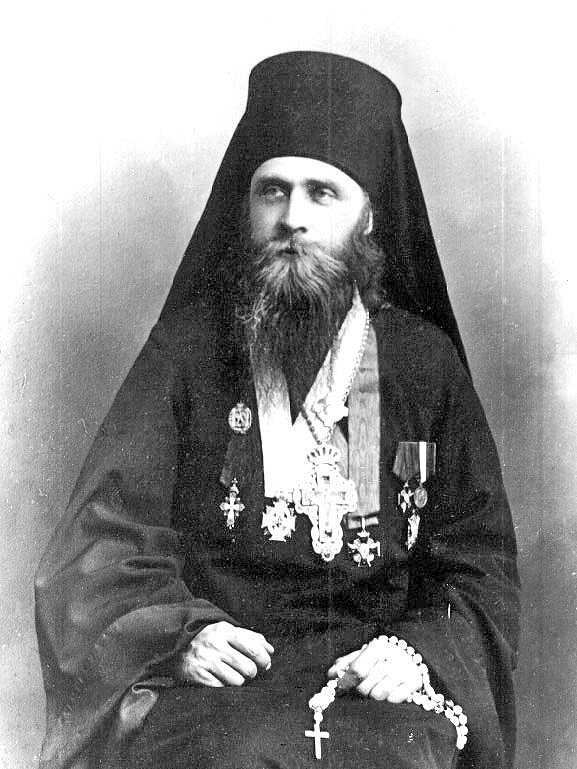
New Hieromartyr Lawrence (Knyazev), Bishop of Balakhnin.

New Hieromartyr Alexis Porfiriev, Archpriest.

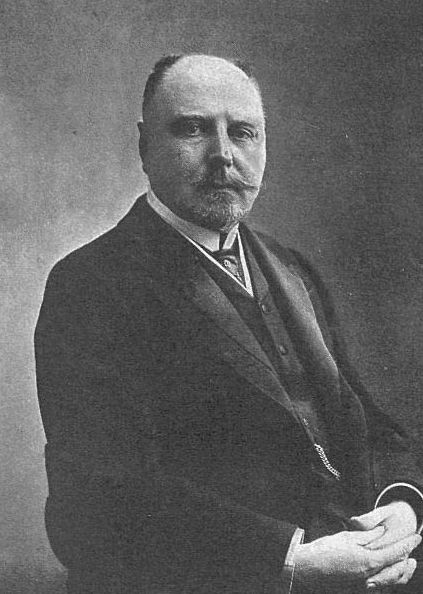
New Martyr Alexis Neidhardt.

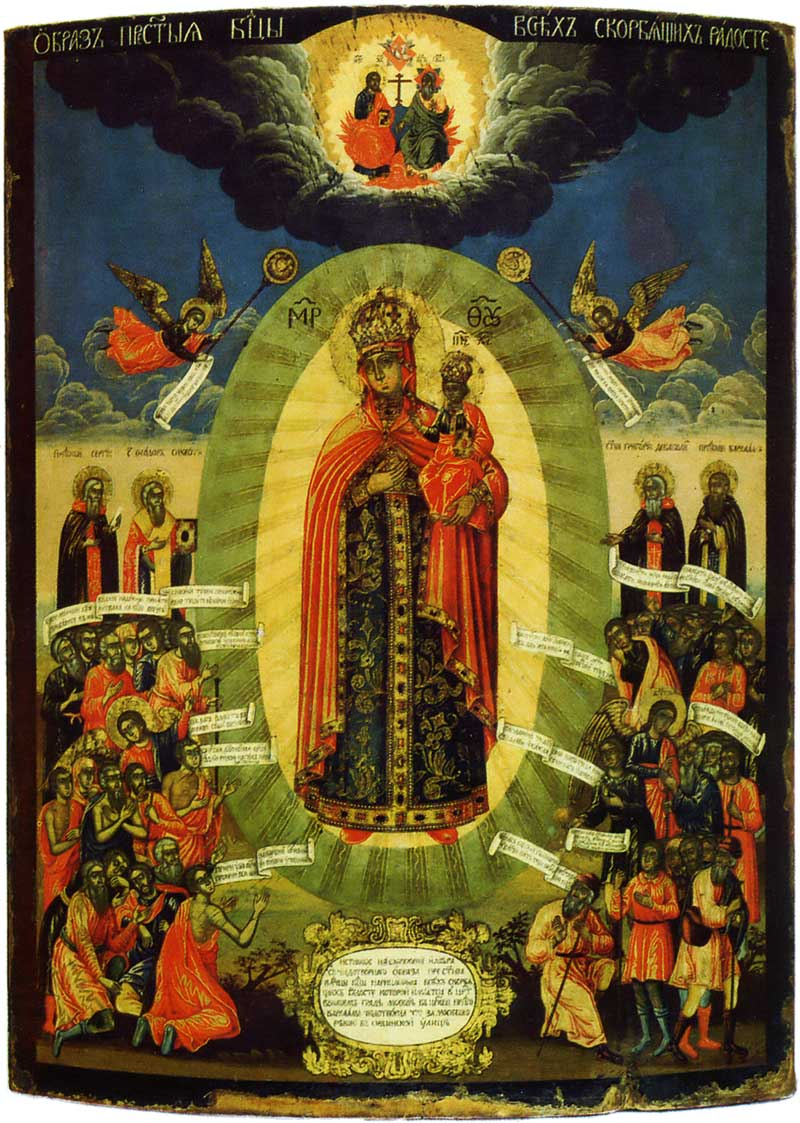
Icon of the Mother of God "Joy of all who Sorrow".

== Sources ==
- October 24 / November 6. Orthodox Calendar (PRAVOSLAVIE.RU).
- November 6 / October 24. HOLY TRINITY RUSSIAN ORTHODOX CHURCH (A parish of the Patriarchate of Moscow).
- October 24. OCA - The Lives of the Saints.
- The Autonomous Orthodox Metropolia of Western Europe and the Americas (ROCOR). St. Hilarion Calendar of Saints for the year of our Lord 2004. St. Hilarion Press (Austin, TX). p. 79.
- The Twenty-Fourth Day of the Month of October. Orthodoxy in China.
- October 24. Latin Saints of the Orthodox Patriarchate of Rome.
- The Roman Martyrology. Transl. by the Archbishop of Baltimore. Last Edition, According to the Copy Printed at Rome in 1914. Revised Edition, with the Imprimatur of His Eminence Cardinal Gibbons. Baltimore: John Murphy Company, 1916. p. 328.
- Rev. Richard Stanton. A Menology of England and Wales, or, Brief Memorials of the Ancient British and English Saints Arranged According to the Calendar, Together with the Martyrs of the 16th and 17th Centuries. London: Burns & Oates, 1892. pp. 512–513.

Greek Sources

- Great Synaxaristes: (in Greek) 24 ΟΚΤΩΒΡΙΟΥ. ΜΕΓΑΣ ΣΥΝΑΞΑΡΙΣΤΗΣ.
- (in Greek) Συναξαριστής. 24 Οκτωβρίου. ECCLESIA.GR. (H ΕΚΚΛΗΣΙΑ ΤΗΣ ΕΛΛΑΔΟΣ).
- (in Greek) 24/10/2017. Ορθόδοξος Συναξαριστής.

Russian Sources

- (in Russian) 6 ноября (24 октября). Православная Энциклопедия под редакцией Патриарха Московского и всея Руси Кирилла (электронная версия). (Orthodox Encyclopedia - Pravenc.ru).
- (in Russian) 24 октября по старому стилю / 6 ноября по новому стилю. Русская Православная Церковь - Православный церковный календарь на 2016 год.
