= Severinus of Bordeaux =

Severinus (French: Seurin, pronounced [sœ.ʁɛ̃]; died 420) was an early bishop of Bordeaux later venerated as the patron saint of the city on account of the miracles he reputedly worked in defence of the city. He was remembered for his strong stance against Arianism. His feast day is October 21 in the latest Roman Martyrology.

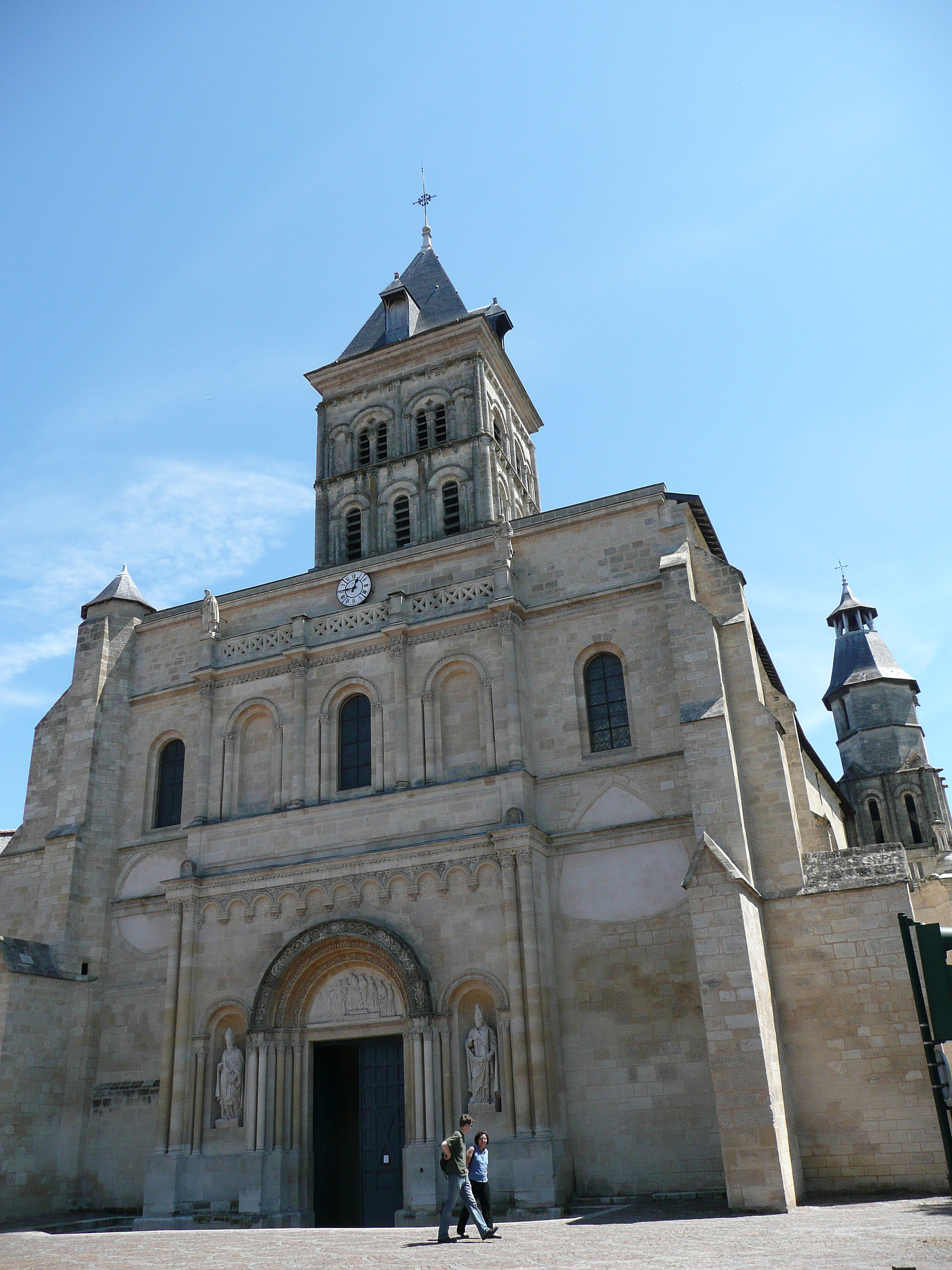
Basilica of Saint Severinus of Bordeaux

The Roman Martyrology formerly identified Severinus as a bishop of Cologne who died at Bordeaux, leading many scholars to identify him with the independently known Saint Severinus of Cologne, whose feast is on October 23.

It is now generally accepted that Severinus of Bordeaux and Severinus of Cologne are two different people. According to Gregory of Tours, the glory of Saint Martin of Tours at the time of his death was revealed to Severinus. According to Gregory, he was engaged in fighting Arianism when he heard a voice that told him to go to Bordeaux. He was already a bishop at this time. According to the poet Venantius Fortunatus, he was the bishop of Trier, which had come under Frankish control in 407. At Bordeaux, the sitting bishop, Amandus, likewise instructed by a voice, resigned his office to Severinus, or possibly merely made him his successor.

The cult devoted to him by the people of Bordeaux is testimony to the influence he exercised among his followers. The Basilica of Saint Severinus of Bordeaux is named for him.
