= George of Drama =

20th-century Orthodox saint (1901 – 1959)

Saint George of Drama
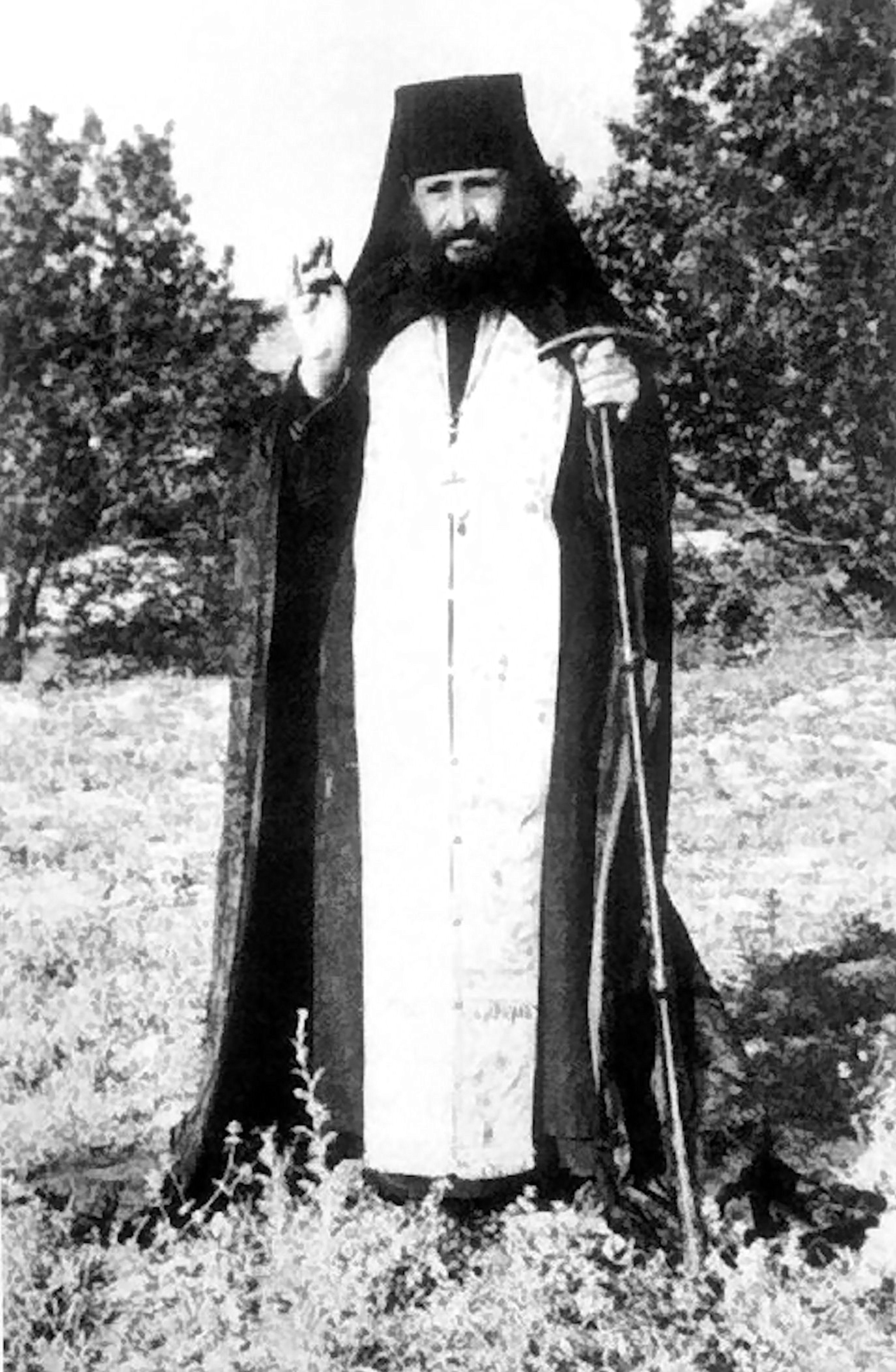
- A photograph of St. George giving a priestly blessing

Venerable New Confessor
- Born: Athanasios Karslidis ათანასე კარსლიდისი 1 January 1901; Chadik, Tsalka, Borchaly uezd, Tiflis Governorate, Caucasus Viceroyalty, Russian Empire (now Georgia (country))
- Died: 4 November 1959 (aged 58); Taxiarchis, Drama, Greece
- Venerated in: Eastern Orthodox Church
- Canonized: November 2, 2008, Monastery of the Ascension of Christ, in Taxiarchis, Drama, by Ecumenical Patriarchate of Constantinople.
- Major shrine: Relics in Monastery of the Ascension of Christ, in Taxiarchis, Drama.
- Feast: November 4 (ns) October 24 (os)

Saint George of Drama (Greek: Ὁ Ὅσιος Γεώργιος τῆς Δράμας; 1 January 1901 – 4 November 1959), born Athanasios Karslidis, was a Greek Orthodox monk of Caucasian origin. He is venerated as a saint in the Eastern Orthodox Church and associated with both Greek and Georgian Orthodox traditions. He was noted for both his spiritual guidance and ascetic lifestyle. Karslidis died on 4 November 1959 in Greece at the age of 58. He is buried behind the katholikon (main church) of the Monastery of the Ascension, where he served for thirty years.

The relics of Athanasios Karslidis are preserved at the Monastery of the Ascension of Christ in Taxiarches, Drama, Greece. Reports indicate that his skull bears an imprint resembling a cross.

One relic was transferred to Wuppertal, Germany in 2013. He was officially canonized on 2 November 2008, during a visit by Ecumenical Patriarch Bartholomew to Drama. In 2016, a portion of his relics was donated to the Episcopal Church of Tsalka, Georgia, under the Georgian Orthodox Church.

On 24 December 2008, the Holy Synod of the Russian Orthodox Church included Athanasios Karslidis in the Menology of the Russian Orthodox Church, designating his feast day as 24 October (Old Style) / 6th November (New Style).

== Early life ==
George Karslidis was born in 1901 in Chadik, Tsalka, then part of the Russian Empire. His parents were Savva and Sophia Karslides. His grandparents were refugees from Gümüşhane in the Ottoman Empire, having fled following the Crimean War. At a young age, he lost both of his parents on the same day and was placed in the care of his older brother. According to anonymous accounts, after suffering unspecified abuse from his brother, Karslidis fled to the mountains, where he was found by Turkish villagers and taken to Pontus. In 1938 he founded the Monastery of the Ascension of Christ in Taxiarches, where he eventually served as an elder.

== Career ==
Karslidis began his monastic life as a novice at a monastery in Georgia after traveling to Tiflis, where a priest took him under his care. According to reports, he waited nearly ten years to be tonsured as a monk. In July 1919, at the age of eighteen, he was tonsured and received the monastic name George Symeon. He was imprisoned by the communist government and allegedly tortured. According to tradition, he was also sentenced to death but survived, despite being hit by three bullets. Biographers note that, even at this early stage, Karslidis had attracted many visitors seeking his guidance. Some hagiographical accounts claim that he was seen levitating in prayer during the Divine Liturgy.

In 1929, Karslidis settled in the village of Taxiarches, Sipsa, in northern Greece, where he lived for the remaining thirty years of his life. In 1936 he made a pilgrimage to the Holy Land, visiting Christian holy sites, monasteries, and hermitages.

Some of Karslidis’ followers attribute to him prophecies concerning World War II and the subsequent Greek Civil War. In 1941, he was reportedly sentenced to death by Bulgarian forces, though he was not executed.

== Monastery of the Ascension ==
The Monastery of the Ascension began in 1938 when the Greek government gave one acre of land to Karslidis as part of a program to support rural communities. On this land, Karslidis built a small monastery dedicated to the Ascension of Jesus, which was officially blessed and opened in 1939.

After Karslidis died, the monastery was gradually neglected and fell into poor condition. In 1970, Dionysios (Kyratsous), the Metropolitan of Drama, began work to repair and revive it. The monastery reopened as an active religious community, including a new group of nuns. It was blessed again on 25 April 1971 and formally recognized by the Church of Greece on 5 November 1976, ensuring its continued role as a functioning monastery.

== Attributed sayings ==
"God cares for everyone. Despair is in effect a lack of faith."
