= Servandus and Germanus =

Spanish martyrs (d. 305 AD)

Saint Servandus and Germanus
- Died: ~305 AD
- Venerated in: Catholic Church, Eastern Orthodox Church
- Feast: October 23
- Attributes: Depicted as young soldiers
- Patronage: Cádiz

Servandus and Germanus (Spanish: San Servando y San Germán) (d. 305 AD) were Spanish martyrs who are venerated as Christian saints.

They were killed near Cádiz. Tradition states that they were from Mérida. They joined the Roman Army and during the persecution of Diocletian, were imprisoned after being identified as Christians. They made new converts in prison.

The vicarius of Mérida, Viator, tortured them and planned to take them to Mauritania Tingitana and had them walk barefoot and in chains from Mérida to Cádiz. Viator failed to find a boat that could take them and they were decapitated on a hill of the fundus Ursianus in the conventus Gaditanus. The body of Germanus was buried at Mérida and that of Servandus at Cádiz, and then later translated to Seville. The hill of fundus Ursianus has been identified with Cerro de los Mártires (San Fernando) and with Cerro de Torrejosa near Facinas (Tarifa).

== Veneration ==
Servandus and Germanus are mentioned in the martyrologies of Bede, Usuard, Ado, as well as the Mozarabic breviary, and in the breviaries of Toledo, Seville, Salamanca, among others. They are venerated as patron saints of Cádiz (officially since 1619). On the Sunday closest to October 23 they celebrate in the town of San Fernando the festival of Saints Servandus and Germanus, carrying statues of the saints in a procession.

The sculptor Luisa Roldán (1650–1704), called La Roldana, made sculptures of these two saints at Cádiz.
