= Severin of Cologne =

Saint Severin of Cologne
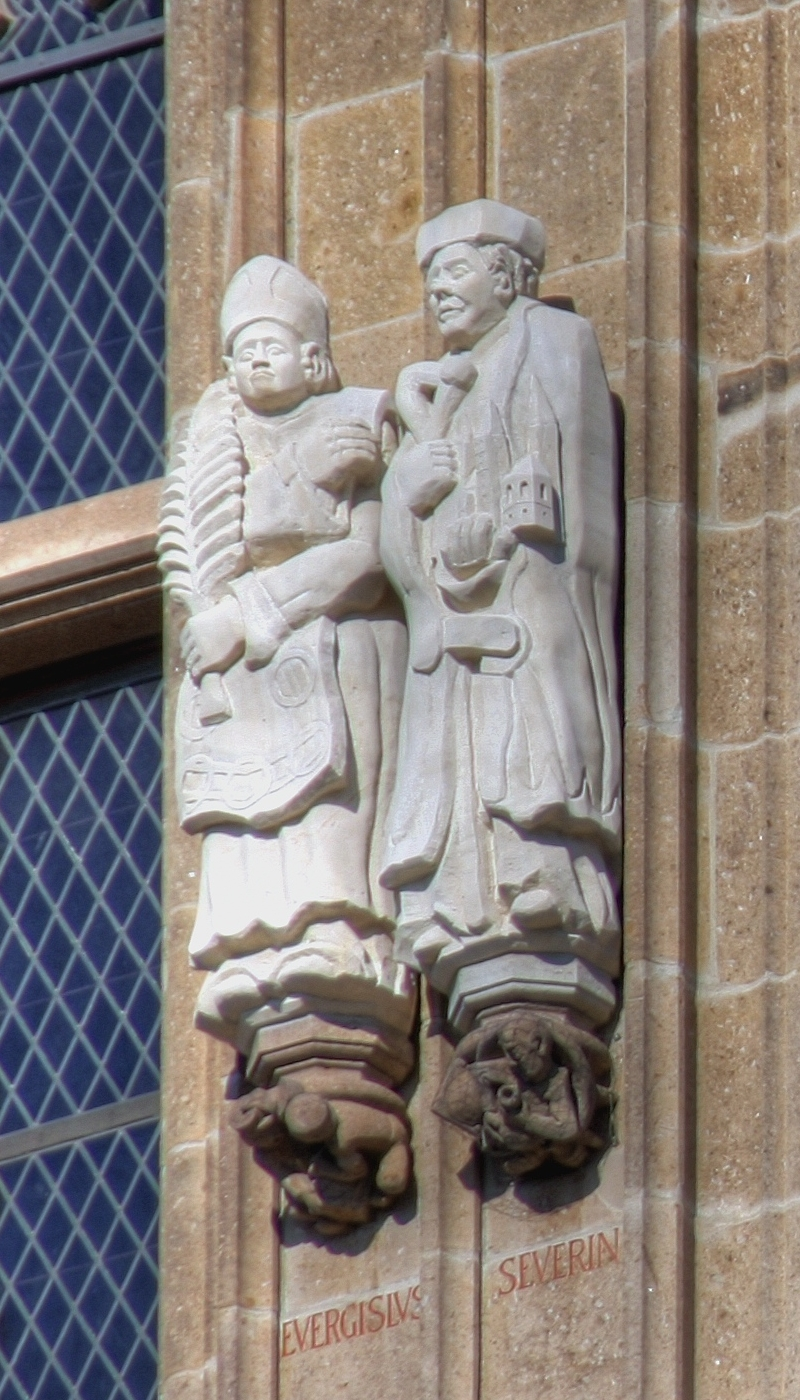
- Stone statues of Eberigisil and Severin at the Cologne City Hall Tower

Bishop
- Born: unknown
- Died: 404
- Feast: 23 October
- Attributes: depicted coming from the cathedral to bless the poor
- Patronage: against bad luck and drought

Severin of Cologne (Latin: Severinus) was the third Bishop of Cologne, living in the later 4th century.

== Life ==
Severin is said in 376 to have founded a monastery in the then Colonia Agrippina in honour of the martyrs Cornelius and Cyprian, from which developed the later Basilica of St. Severin. Severin is notable as a prominent opponent of Arianism.

According to legend, Severinus was taking a walk in a field while still a priest when he heard a voice tell him he would one day be bishop of Cologne. When he asked when that would happen, he was told when his staff buds and flowers. Immediately, he stuck his staff into the ground, it budded and he was called to Cologne.

== Veneration ==
Severin was highly venerated in Cologne early on. His bones are today preserved in a gold shrine in the choir of St Severin's Church in Cologne. That seen today is a reconstruction of 1819, as the medieval shrine was melted down for the gold in the period of French rule, c. 1795–98. Its opening in 1999 corroborated the documented transfer of the bones of bishop Wigfried of Cologne (924–953), as it was possible to date the old inner wooden shrine by the latest dendrochronological techniques to the year 948. An ancient cloth, probably Byzantine, was also discovered, with which the wooden box was lined. The saint's feast day is 23 October.

Severin of Cologne is also venerated as a saint in the Eastern Orthodox Church.

== See also ==
- Severinus of Bordeaux

Preceded by Euphrates	Archbishop of Cologne ca. 348(?) – ca. 403	Succeeded by Ebergisil I(?)
