= Séverine (disambiguation) =

Séverine (1855–1929) was a French journalist, anarchist, and feminist

Séverine may also refer to:

- Séverine (given name), a female given name
- Séverine (singer) (born 1948), French singer who won the Eurovision Song Contest 1971
- Sévérine, a character in the James Bond movie Skyfall

== See also ==
- Severin (disambiguation)
- Severina (disambiguation)
