= Severin (given name) =

Severin, Séverin or Severinus is a masculine given name. It is derived from Latin severus "severe, serious, strict". It may refer to:

== People ==
- Pope Severinus (died 640)
- Severin of Cologne (died 403)
- Severinus of Noricum (c. 410-482), the "Apostle to Noricum", Roman Catholic saint
- Saint Severinus of Septempeda (died 550), Roman Catholic bishop and hermit
- Séverin of Paris, a hermit who lived on the site of the current Saint-Séverin, Paris church
- George Chapman (murderer), born Severin Klosowski, British serial poisoner and suspect in the Jack the Ripper murders
- Severin von Eckardstein (born 1978), German pianist
- Severin Roesen (c. 1815–72), a painter known for his still lifes of flowers and fruit
- Severin Hallauer (born 1996), Swiss artist
- Severyn Nalyvaiko, leader of the Ukrainian Cossacks, a hero of Ukrainian folklore
- Severin Freund (born 1988), a German ski jumper
- Steven Severin, stage name of co-founder of British post-punk band Siouxsie and the Banshees
- Nikolaj Frederik Severin Grundtvig. Danish clergy, author, poet and philosopher
- Bernhard Severin Ingemann, Danish clergy and hymnwriter
- Severin Sterm, Danish topographical writer
- Peder Severin Krøyer, Danish painter

== Fictional characters ==
- Severin von Kusiemski, a character in the novel Venus in Furs by Leopold von Sacher-Masoch
- Severin Winter, a wrestling prodigy in The 158-Pound Marriage, a novel by John Irving
- Severinus of Sankt Wendel, in the novel The Name of the Rose by Umberto Eco
- Severin, in the novel Severin's Journey into the Dark by Paul Leppin
- Severin von Phoenix, in the Japanese manga and anime Princess Resurrection by Yasunori Mitsunaga
- Dr. Severin, in the original Star Trek episode "The Way To Eden"
- Severin, The Horned Boy in the Holly Black novel "The Darkest Part of the Forest"

== See also ==
- St. Severin (disambiguation)
- Severino (Italian, Spanish, and Portuguese version of the name)
- Søren (given name) (Danish version of the name)
- Seweryn (Polish version of the name)
- Severyn (Ukrainian version of the name)
