= Siberia (disambiguation) =

Siberia is the region of Russia and northern Kazakhstan between the Ural Mountains and the Pacific Ocean.

Siberia may also refer to:

== Geography ==
- Siberia (continent), the craton located in the heart of the region of Siberia
- Siberian Federal District, a federal district of Russia
- Siberia, California, a disappeared town in the Mojave Desert, California
- Siberia, Indiana, a community in the United States
- Waverley, Western Australia or Siberia, an abandoned town in the goldfields
- 1094 Siberia, an asteroid
- La Brévine, known as the Siberia of Switzerland

== Film and TV ==
- Siberia (1926 film), a lost 1926 silent film
- Siberia (1998 film), a 1998 Dutch comedy film
- Siberia (2018 film), a 2018 romantic crime thriller
- Siberia (2020 film), a 2020 Italian film
- Siberia (TV series), a 2013 American TV series

== Music ==
- Siberia (opera), a 1903 opera by Umberto Giordano
- Siberia (Lights album) and its title track, 2011
- Siberia (Echo & the Bunnymen album), 2005
- Siberia (Polvo album), 2013
- "Siberia", from the 1955 musical Silk Stockings
- "Siberia", a song by Headie One from Edna (album)
- "Siberia", a song by the Backstreet Boys from Never Gone
- "Siberian Khatru" or "Siberia", a 1972 song by Yes

== Transportation ==
- JSC Siberia Airlines, a legal name of S7 Airlines

== Culinary ==
- Siberia (cake), a Japanese dessert made with castella and yōkan

== See also ==
- Syberia (disambiguation)
- Sibiria, a Swedish indie pop band
- Cyberia (disambiguation)
- Siberian (disambiguation)
- Sibirsky (disambiguation)
