= Severinus =

Severinus is a name held by multiple people.

- Severinus (consul 461), Roman politician
- Severinus, Exuperius, and Felician, saints
- Severinus of Bordeaux, saint
- Severinus of Cologne, saint
- Severinus of Noricum, saint
- Severinus of Sanseverino, saint
- Severinus Boethius, Roman consul and philosopher (and saint)
- Pope Severinus, pope
- Severinus of Saxony, prince
- Severinus Desiré Emanuels

== See also ==
- Severianus (disambiguation)
- Severin (disambiguation)
- Severina (disambiguation)
- Severus (disambiguation)
- Seweryn
