= Severin =

Severin, Séverin or Severinus may refer to:

== People ==
- Severin (given name)
- Severin (surname)

== Places ==
- Caraș-Severin County, a county in Romania
- Severin County, a defunct county in Romania that was merged into the present Caraş-Severin County
- Drobeta-Turnu Severin, a city in Romania, capital of the Mehedinţi County
- Severin, Bjelovar-Bilogora County, Croatia
- Severin na Kupi, Primorje-Gorski Kotar County, Croatia
- Severin, Germany, a village and former municipality in Mecklenburg-Vorpommern, Germany
- Banate of Severin, a territory in the Kingdom of Hungary

== Other ==
- Severin Elektro GmbH, a German electric appliance manufacturer
- Severin Training Center, a subsidiary of the Danish cooperative FDB
- Severin Films, an American film production and distribution company

== See also ==
- Saint Severin (disambiguation)
- Severian (disambiguation)
- Severina (disambiguation)
- Séverine (given name)
- Severino, an Italian, Spanish, and Portuguese variant of the name, sometimes also used as a surname
- Søren (given name), a Danish and Norwegian variant of the name
- Severn, a river in the United Kingdom
