= Sibirsky =

Sibirsky (masculine), Sibirskaya (feminine), or Sibirskoye (neuter) may refer to:

- anything pertaining to Siberia, Russia
- Siberian Federal District (Sibirsky federalny okrug), a federal district of Russia
- Sibirsky Urban Okrug, a municipal formation which the closed administrative-territorial formation of Sibirsky in Altai Krai, Russia is incorporated as
- Sibirsky (rural locality) (Sibirskaya, Sibirskoye), several rural localities in Russia
- Siberian Route (Sibirsky trakt), a historic route which connected European Russia with Siberia and China
- Sibirsky (family), a princely Genghisid family formerly living in Russia
- Sibirskaya (Novosibirsk Metro), a station of the Novosibirsk Metro in Novosibirsk, Russia

== See also ==
- Siberia (disambiguation)
- Siberian (disambiguation)
- West Siberian economic region (Zapadno-Sibirsky ekonomichesky rayon), an economic region of Russia
- East Siberian economic region (Vostochno-Sibirsky ekonomichesky rayon), an economic region of Russia
