= 1853 in Denmark =

- Decades: 1830s; 1840s; 1850s; 1860s; 1870s
- See also: Other events of 1853; List of years in Denmark

Events from the year 1853 in Denmark.

== Incumbents ==
- Monarch – Frederick VII
- Prime minister – Christian Albrecht Bluhme (until 21 April), Anders Sandøe Ørsted

== Events ==
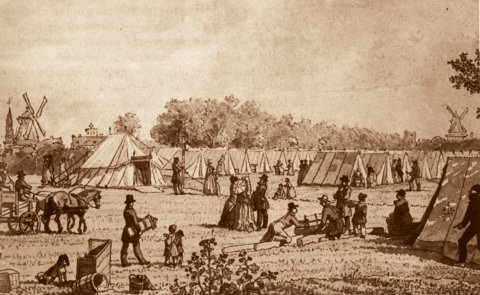
A tent camp outside the Western City Gate in Copenhagen during the 1853 cholera outbreak

- 15 April – The Bing & Grøndahl porcelain manufactury is founded in Copenhagen.
- 20 May – Horsens State Prison is inaugurated.
- 11 June – 1853 Copenhagen cholera outbreak begins and continues until October.

=== Undated ===
- Skælskør Steam Mill is constructed.

== Births ==
=== January–March ===
- 12 March – Johan Bartholdy, composer (died 1904)

=== April–June ===
- 19 April – Harald Ludvig Westergaard, economist, statician (died 1936)
- 1 June – Valdemar Riise, pharmacist (died 1914)
- 21 June – Peder Vilhelm Jensen-Klint, architect, designer, painter and architectural theorist (died 1930)

=== July–September ===
- 10 July – Nielsine Petersen, sculptor (died 1916)
- 13 September – Hans Christian Gram, bacteriologist (died 1938)
- 29 September – Princess Thyra of Denmark, Crown Princess of Hanover (died 1933 in Austria)

=== October–December ===
- 9 December – Laurits Tuxen, painter (died 1927)

== Deaths ==
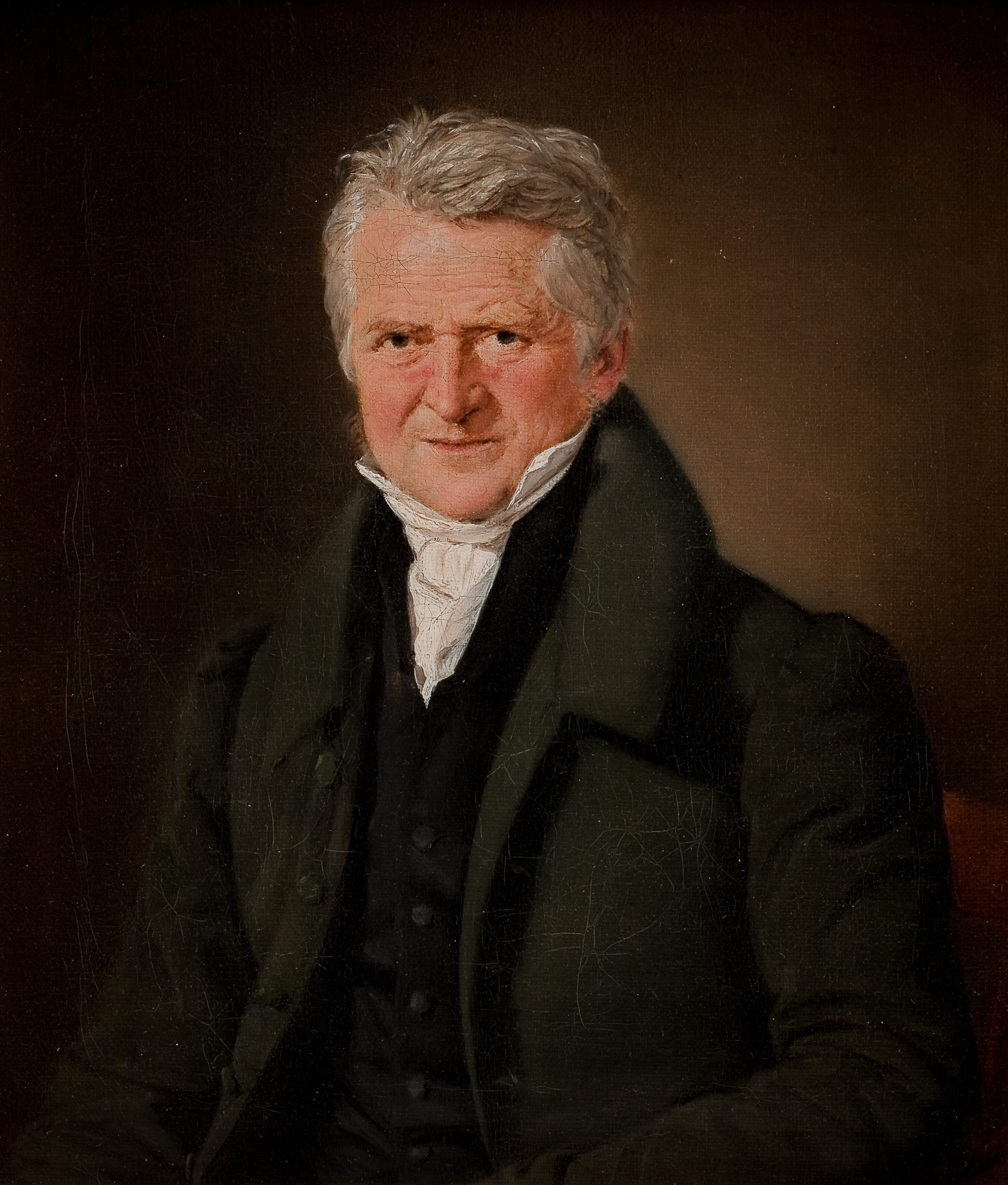
Christoffer Wilhelm Eckersberg-

- 22 July – Christoffer Wilhelm Eckersberg, painter and professor (born 1783)
- 24 November – Severin Sterm, topographical writer (born 1784)
- 22 December – Frederik von Scholten, naval officer and painter (born 1796)
