= Severiano =

Severiano may refer to:

- Severiano Álvarez (1933–2013), Leonese language writer
- Severiano Ballesteros (1957–2011), Spanish professional golfer, a World No. 1
- Severiano Sainz y Bencamo (1871–1937), the second Bishop of the Roman Catholic Diocese of Matanzas (1915–1937)
- Severiano de Heredia (1836–1901), Cuban-born biracial politician, a freemason, a left-wing republican, naturalized as French in 1870
- Lauro Severiano Muller (1863–1926), Brazilian politician, diplomat, and military engineer
- Nuno Severiano Teixeira (born 1957), Portuguese politician

== See also ==
- Severiano de Almeida, municipality in the state Rio Grande do Sul, Brazil
- Estádio Severiano Gomes Filho, also known as Estádio Pajuçara, is a multi-use stadium in Pajuçara neighborhood, Maceió, Brazil
- Severiano Melo, municipality in the state of Rio Grande do Norte in the Northeast region of Brazil
- Doutor Severiano, municipality in the state of Rio Grande do Norte in the Northeast region of Brazil
- Estádio General Severiano, football stadium located in Rio de Janeiro, Brazil
- Severian (disambiguation)
- Severino
