= Saint-Séverin, Quebec =

Saint-Séverin, Quebec can refer to:

- Saint-Séverin, Chaudière-Appalaches, Quebec, a parish in the Chaudière-Appalaches region
- Saint-Séverin, Mauricie, Quebec, a parish in the Mauricie region

== See also ==
- Saint-Séverin (disambiguation)
