= Siberia (cake) =

Japanese cake

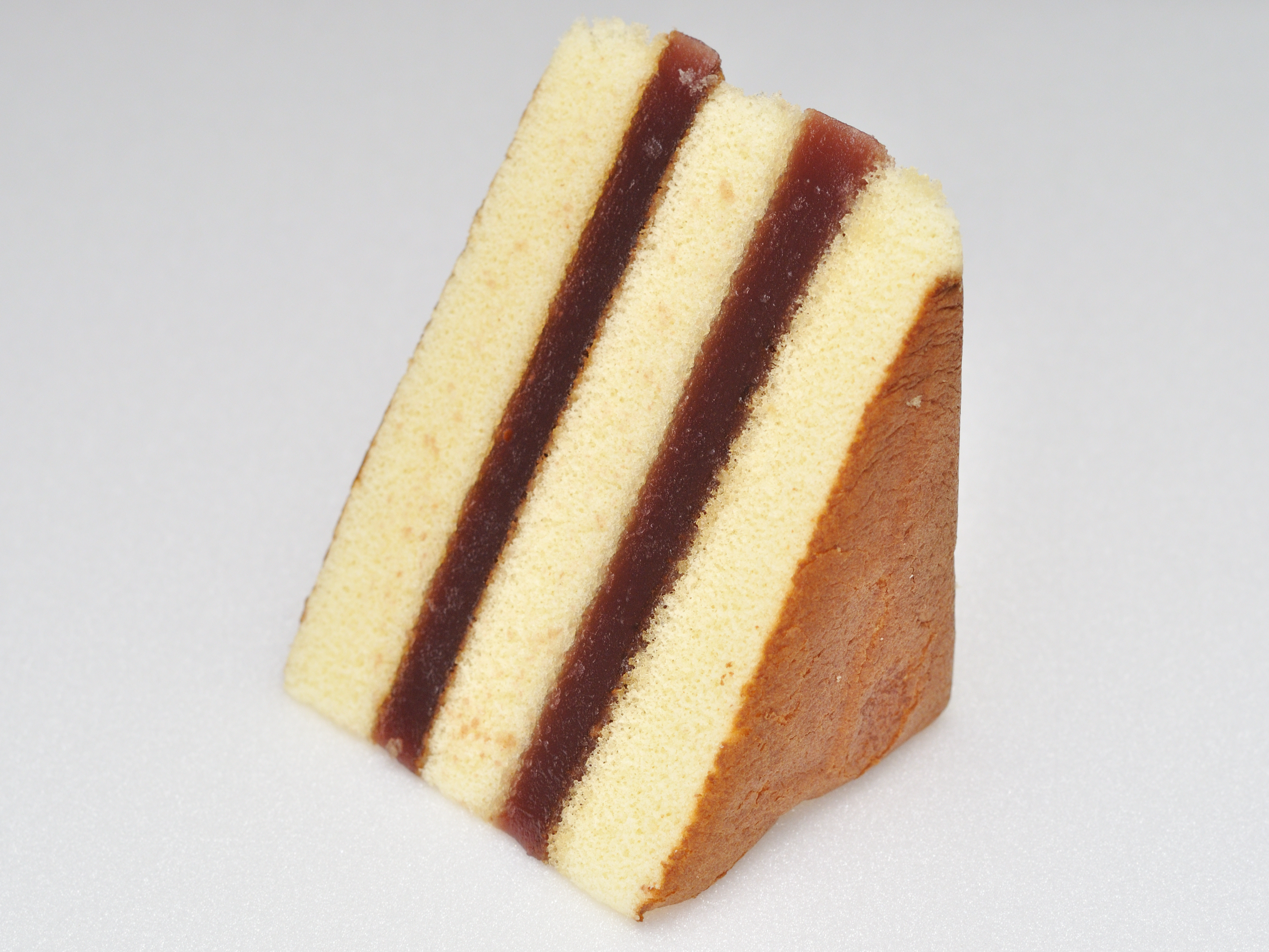
- Alternative names: yōkan castella
- Type: cake
- Place of origin: Japan
- Main ingredients: castella & yōkan

Siberia (シベリア) is a Japanese cake made with castella cakes and yōkan (sweet red bean paste). For this reason, it is sometimes called yōkan castella.

== Description ==
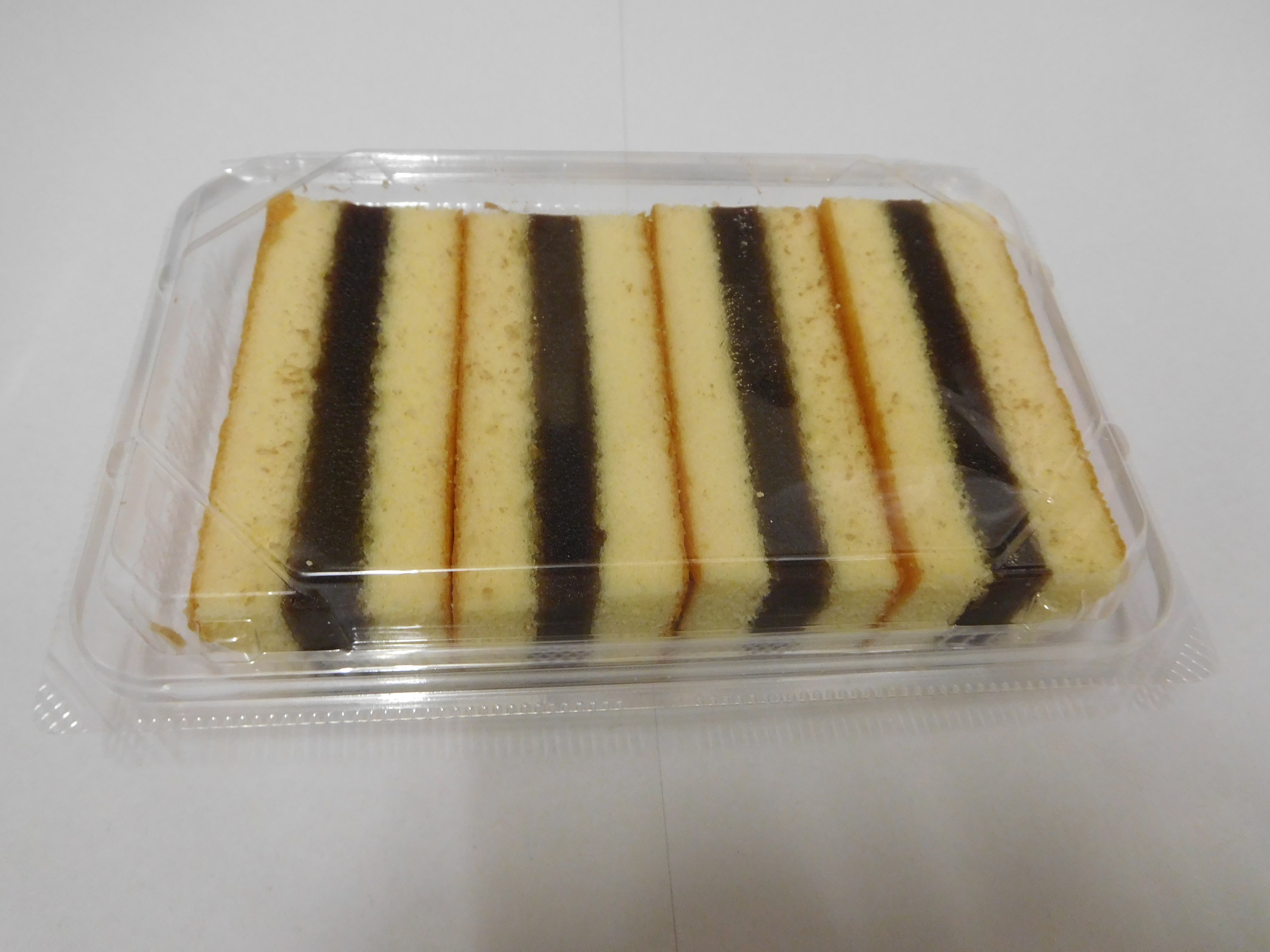
Siberia cake.

Although it looks like yokan (sweet bean paste) sandwiched between layers of castella cake, it is actually made by pouring yokan over baked castella dough, which is then covered with another layer of castella cake, creating a tight seal.

== History ==
Although it is named after Siberia, there are several theories about its origin.

The cake began to be made, according to Kotei Bakery, founded in 1916, between the late Meiji and early Taisho periods, and records indicate that it was made in bakeries at the time.

== See also ==
- List of Japanese snacks
