= Sanseverino =

Sanseverino may refer to:

- House of Sanseverino, Neapolitan noble family
- Antonio Sanseverino, (ca. 1477–1543), Neapolitan cardinal
- Aurora Sanseverino (1669–1726), Italian noblewoman and salonniere
- Ferdinando Sanseverino (1507–1572), prince of Salerno and Italian condottiero
- Gaetano Sanseverino (1811–1865), Italian theologian
- Stéphane Sanseverino (born 1961), French singer
- Valentina Sanseverino (born 1999), known as Vale LP, Italian singer-songwriter and rapper

== Fictional ==
- Robyn Sanseverino, an FBI agent with a recurring role on HBO's popular crime-drama series The Sopranos

== See also ==
- San Severino (disambiguation)
