= Syberia (disambiguation) =

Syberia is an adventure video game franchise created by Belgian artist Benoît Sokal.

Syberia may also refer to:

- Syberia (video game), a 2002 game and the first entry of the Syberia franchise
- The Polish name for Siberia, a region of Russia
- Syberia, Łódź Voivodeship (central Poland)
- Syberia, Mława County in Masovian Voivodeship (east-central Poland)
- Syberia, Żuromin County in Masovian Voivodeship (east-central Poland)
- Syberia (album), a 2005 album by Hamlet

== See also ==
- Cyberia (disambiguation)
- Siberia (disambiguation)
