= Sibirsky (rural locality) =

Sibirsky (Russian: Сиби́рский; masculine), Sibirskaya (Сиби́рская; feminine) or Sibirskoye (Сиби́рское; neuter) is the name of several rural localities in Russia.

== Modern localities ==
- Sibirskoye, Kaliningrad Oblast, a settlement in Turgenevsky Rural Okrug of Polessky District of Kaliningrad Oblast
- Sibirskoye, Novovarshavsky District, Omsk Oblast, a settlement in Novorossiysky Rural Okrug of Novovarshavsky District of Omsk Oblast
- Sibirskoye, Russko-Polyansky District, Omsk Oblast, a selo in Sibirsky Rural Okrug of Russko-Polyansky District of Omsk Oblast
- Sibirsky, Altai Krai, a closed settlement in Altai Krai
- Sibirsky, Khanty–Mansi Autonomous Okrug, a settlement in Khanty-Mansiysky District of Khanty-Mansi Autonomous Okrug
- Sibirsky, Novosibirsk Oblast, a settlement in Kupinsky District of Novosibirsk Oblast
- Sibirsky, Pervomaysky District, Altai Krai, a settlement in Sibirsky Selsoviet of Pervomaysky District of Altai Krai
- Sibirsky, Tambov Oblast, a settlement in Nizhneshibryaysky Selsoviet of Uvarovsky District of Tambov Oblast
- Sibirsky, Voronezh Oblast, a settlement in Gnilovskoye Rural Settlement of Ostrogozhsky District of Voronezh Oblast

== Abolished localities ==
- Sibirsky, Kemerovo Oblast, a settlement in Tarasovskaya Rural Territory of Prokopyevsky District of Kemerovo Oblast; abolished in November 2012
