= Severyn =

Severyn (Ukrainian: Северин) is a Ukrainian masculine given name. It may refer to:

- Severyn Nalyvaiko (? - 1597) a leader of the Ukrainian Cossacks, the leader of the Nalyvaiko Uprising.
- Severyn Shekhovych (1829-1872) a Ukrainian journalist and writer.
- Severyn Danylovych (1860-1931) a Ukrainian writer and activist.
- Severyn Levytskyi (1890-1962) a Plast activist.
- Yuriy Severyn (1927-2002) a Ukrainian painter.
- Severyn Palydovych (b. 1938) a Ukrainian singer.

== See also ==
- Severin (given name)
- Seweryn
