= Cyberia =

Cyberia may refer to:

== Technology ==
- Cyberia (book), a 1994 non-fiction book by Douglas Rushkoff
- Cyberia (ISP), a West Asian ISP serving Lebanon, Jordan and Saudi Arabia
- Cyberia, London, one of the first Internet cafés, and the first in the UK

== Entertainment ==
- Cyberia (album), a 1995 album by Cubanate
- "Cyberia", a song by the Afro Celt Sound System from the album Seed
- Cyberia (video game), a 1994 video game
- The penal colony to which Dave Lister was sentenced in the Red Dwarf book Last Human
- The techno-rave night club featured in Serial Experiments Lain
- Cyberia, a 2008 book by Chris Lynch

== See also ==
- Siberia (disambiguation)
- Syberia (disambiguation)
