= Siberian (disambiguation) =

Siberian means pertaining to Siberia.

Siberian may also refer to:

- Siberians, demonym for residents of Siberia, as well as the Russian sub-ethnic group
- Siberian (cat), cat breed
- Paleo-Indians
- Tungusic peoples

== See also ==
- Siberia (disambiguation)
- Sibiryak (disambiguation)
- Siverian (disambiguation)
