= Severian =

Severian, Siverian, Severians or Severianus may refer to:

== People ==
=== Ancient Rome: pagans ===
In chronological order.

- Publius Juventius Celsus Titus Aufidius Hoenius Severianus (c. 67 – c. 130), Roman jurist
- Sextus Cocceius Severianus (fl. 145–163), Roman senator and governor
- Marcus Sedatius Severianus (105–161/2), Roman senator
- Otacilius Severianus (3rd century), Roman governor, father of Marcia Otacilia Severa
- Flavius Severianus, son of the emperor Valerius Severus (died 313)
- Iulius Severianus (5th century), Latin rhetor
- Severianus of Damascus (fl. c. 450–480), Roman governor

=== Christians ===
In chronological order.

- Severian and Aquila (3rd century), Christian martyrs, husband and wife
- Severian, Christian martyr torn apart by stones around 300
- Severian, one of the Four Crowned Martyrs at the turn of the 4th century
- Severian (died 320), a Roman Christian soldier who was one of the Forty Martyrs of Sebaste
- Severian of Gabala (fl. c. 400), Christian bishop and a popular preacher in Constantinople
- Severian of Scythopolis (died 453), Christian bishop in Palestine and martyr
- Severian Baranyk (1889–1941), Ukrainian Greek Catholic priest and martyr in Ukraine
- Severian Yakymyshyn (1930–2021), Ukrainian Greek Catholic priest in Canada

== Groups ==
- Severians, a tribe or tribal union of early East Slavs from the 8th to the 10th centuries
- Severian Encratites, a sect of gnostic Encratites, a 2nd-century sect of Christians
- Severians (miaphysite faction), followers of the 6th-century Patriarch Severus of Antioch

== Fictional characters ==
- Severian (character), narrator and protagonist of Gene Wolfe's novels The Book of the New Sun and The Urth of the New Sun
- Siverian, one of the characters in Roderick the Last of the Goths, an 1814 epic poem by Robert Southey

== Other ==
- Severian, anything of or related to Severia, medieval region in Eastern Europe named after the Severian tribe

== See also ==
- Severin (disambiguation)
- Severinus (disambiguation)
- Severiana (disambiguation)
- Severiano (disambiguation)
- Severan (disambiguation)
- Siberian (disambiguation)
