= Sibiryak =

Sibiryak may refer to:

- Sibiryak, Russian word denoting an inhabitant of Siberia, as well as a member of the subethnic group of the Russians
- Sybirak, a Polish term for a person exiled to Siberia by the Russian Empire or by the Soviet Union
- Sibiryak (rural locality), several rural localities in Russia
- Sibirjak, Novosibirsk-Moscow-Berlin express train
- Sibiriak (horse), a horse from the Soviet Union that took part in 1964 Summer Olympics
- Dmitry Mamin-Sibiryak, Russian writer
- FC Sibiryak Bratsk, a Russian association football club based in Bratsk, Irkutsk Oblast
