= Severans =

Severans can refer to:

- the Severan dynasty, a lineage of Roman emperors
- the Severans (miaphysite faction), followers of Severus of Antioch

== See also ==
- Severians (disambiguation)
