= San Severino =

San Severino can refer to:

== Places in Italy ==
- Mercato San Severino, a commune of the Province of Salerno
- San Severino Lucano, a commune of the Province of Potenza
- San Severino Marche, a commune in the Province of Macerata
- San Severino (Centola), a hamlet of Centola in the Province of Salerno
- Santi Severino e Sossio, Naples, a church in Central Naples, Italy

== People ==
- Severinus of Noricum, a Roman Catholic saint
- Severin of Cologne, another saint

== See also ==
- Sanseverino
- Severino
