= Seweryn =

Seweryn is the Polish version of the name Severinus and may refer to:

- Seweryn Berson (1858–1917), Polish lawyer and composer
- Seweryn Bialer (1926–2019), emeritus professor of political science at Columbia University, expert on the Communist parties of the Soviet Union and Poland
- Seweryn Bieszczad (1852–1923), Polish painter
- Seweryn Chajtman (1919–2012), Polish scientist, engineer, teacher, pioneered Computer Science in Poland
- Seweryn Chomet (1930–2009), was a physicist, author, journalist, historian, publisher, translator of Russian scientific journals
- Seweryn Franciszek Czetwertyński-Światopełk (1873–1945), Polish landowner and politician
- Seweryn Gancarczyk (born 1981), professional Polish football player
- Seweryn Goszczyński (1801–1876), Polish Romantic prose writer and poet
- Seweryn Kiełpin (born 1987), Polish footballer
- Seweryn Klosowski (1865–1903), Polish serial killer known as the Borough Poisoner
- Seweryn Krajewski (born 1947), Polish singer and songwriter
- Seweryn Kulesza (1900–1983), Polish horse rider
- Seweryn Michalski (born 1994), Polish footballer
- Seweryn Ozdowski OAM FAICD (born 1949), human rights advocate and Human Rights Commissioner and Disability Discrimination Commissioner for the Australian government
- Seweryn Rzewuski (1743–1811), Polish nobleman, Field Hetman of the Crown, general of the Royal Army, a leader of the Confederation of Targowica
- Wacław Seweryn Rzewuski (1784–1831), Polish explorer, poet, orientalist and horse expert
- Seweryn Steinwurzel (1898–1983), Polish cinematographer
- Andrzej Seweryn (born 1946), Polish and French actor and director
- Damian Seweryn (born 1979), Polish footballer
- Kinga Seweryn (born 2005), Polish footballer
- Łukasz Seweryn (born 1982), Polish footballer
- Marek Seweryn (born 1957), Polish weightlifter
- Wojciech Seweryn (1939–2010), Polish-born sculptor and longtime resident of the United States
- Seweryn Wysłouch (1900–1968), legal historian and vice-rector of Wrocław University

== See also ==
- Sewerynowo
- Sewerynów (disambiguation)
- Severyn
