= Sewerynów =

Sewerynów may refer to the following places:

- Sewerynów, Łask County in Łódź Voivodeship (central Poland)
- Sewerynów, Skierniewice County in Łódź Voivodeship (central Poland)
- Sewerynów, Lublin Voivodeship (east Poland)
- Sewerynów, Gostynin County in Masovian Voivodeship (east-central Poland)
- Sewerynów, Kozienice County in Masovian Voivodeship (east-central Poland)
- Sewerynów, Łosice County in Masovian Voivodeship (east-central Poland)
- Sewerynów, Radom County in Masovian Voivodeship (east-central Poland)
- Sewerynów, Sochaczew County in Masovian Voivodeship (east-central Poland)
- Sewerynów, Węgrów County in Masovian Voivodeship (east-central Poland)
