= Severin (surname) =

Severin is a surname. Notable people with the surname include:

- Arban Severin (born 1976), American composer, musician and film actress
- Carl Theodor Severin (1763–1836), German architect
- Dave Severin, American politician
- Dorothy Severin (born 1942), professor of literature and Hispanist
- Guy Severin (1926–2008), Russian scientist, engineer, inventor and producer of a number of aerospace life-rescue systems and space-suits
- Jacob Severin (1691–1753), Danish merchant who helped establish Ilulissat
- Jay Severin (1951–2020), American radio show host
- John Severin (1921–2012), American cartoonist
- Margaret Severin-Hansen, American ballerina
- Marie Severin (1929–2018), American cartoonist
- Mark Severin (1906–1987), British artist specialising in erotic art, especially bookplates
- Scott Severin (born 1979), Scottish football player
- Steven Severin (born 1955), British musician, Siouxsie and the Banshees
- Tim Severin (1940–2020), British explorer and writer
- Toni Severin, New Zealand politician
