= Harald Ludvig Westergaard =

Danish statistician and economist

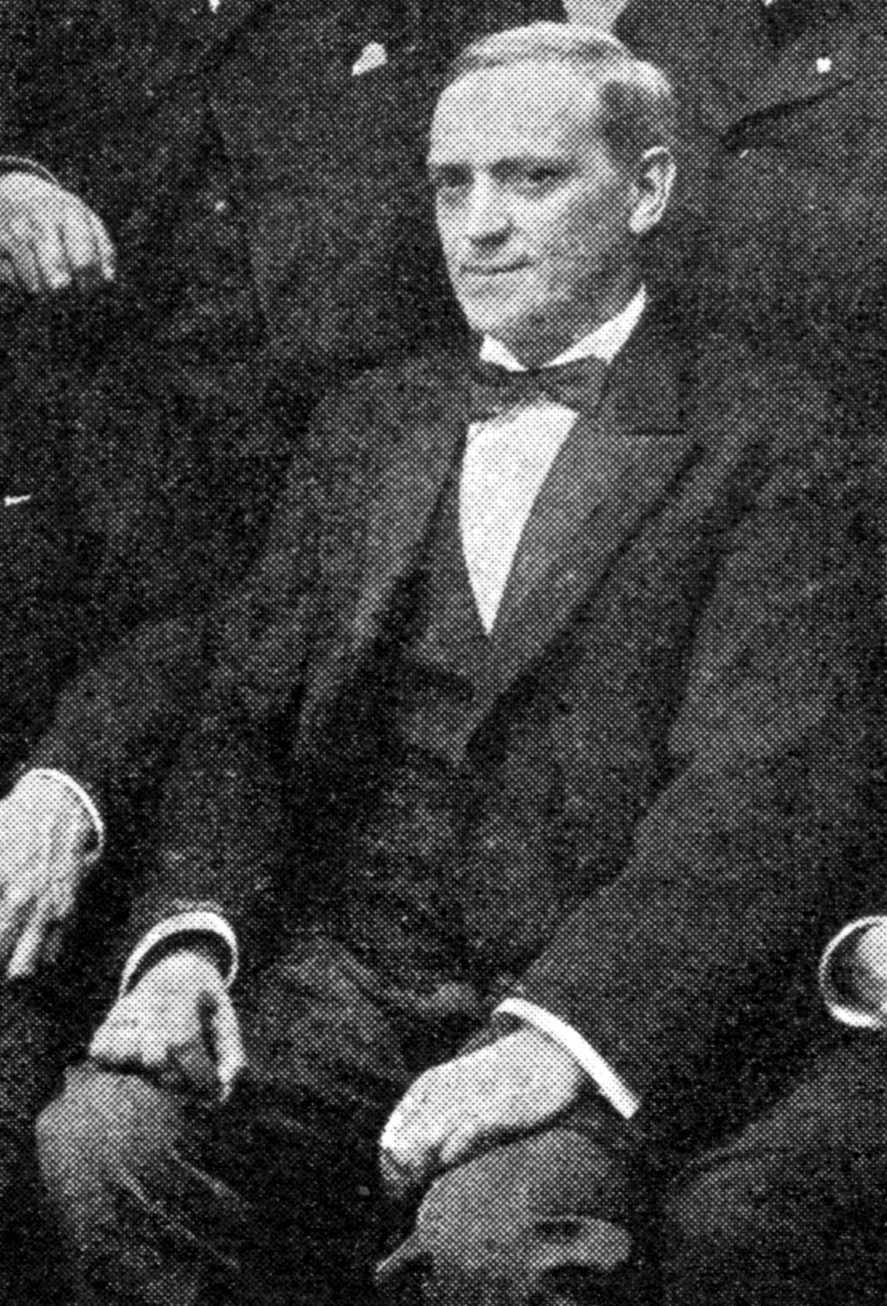
Harald Ludvig Westergaard

Harald Ludvig Westergaard (April 19, 1853, in Copenhagen – December 13, 1936, in Copenhagen) was a Danish statistician and economist known for his work in demography and the history of statistics.

Harald Westergaard was born in Copenhagen and apart from a period studying in England and Germany in 1877-78 he lived there all his life. His subject at the University of Copenhagen was mathematics but he became interested in economics and, while he was in England, he seems to have met William Stanley Jevons. In the preface to the second edition (1879) of the Theory of Political Economy Jevons refers to Westergaard's mathematical suggestions. However, after this spectacular debut Westergaard seems not to have contributed further to mathematical economics.

In 1880–1882, Westergaard worked for the Danish Insurance Office and he developed an interest in demography. His international reputation was made by the publication of Die Lehre von der Mortalität und Morbilität (1881). This work won him a gold medal from the university and led to his appointment as a lecturer in 1883. In 1886, he became a professor at the early age of 33. He retired in 1924.

Westergaard's late work Contributions to the History of Statistics (1932) described the history of vital and economic statistics up to the end of the nineteenth century. Statistical theory, whether of the Laplace or Pearson variety, is discussed but given a subordinate place. In the Introduction, Westergaard remarks, "For a long while ... the calculus of probabilities had less influence on statistics than might have been expected, the authors confining themselves to abstract theories which had little or nothing to do with reality."

Westergaard was well-known and respected internationally. The obituary in the Journal of the Royal Statistical Society of London, begins, "By [his] death Europe has lost her senior statistician" and ends, "This is not the place to write at length about his personal charm, marked by simplicity, helpfulness and friendliness; but it was this as much as his intellectual eminence that gave him a unique place in the society of economists and statisticians."

== Books by Harald Westergaard ==
- Die Lehre von der Mortalität und Morbilität: Anthropologisch-statistische Untersuchungen. 1881
- Grundzüge der Theorie der Statistik. 1890
- Economic Development in Denmark before and during the World War. 1922
- Contributions to the History of Statistics, 1932, reprinted 1969 New York: Kelley
