= Castella =

Japanese sponge cake

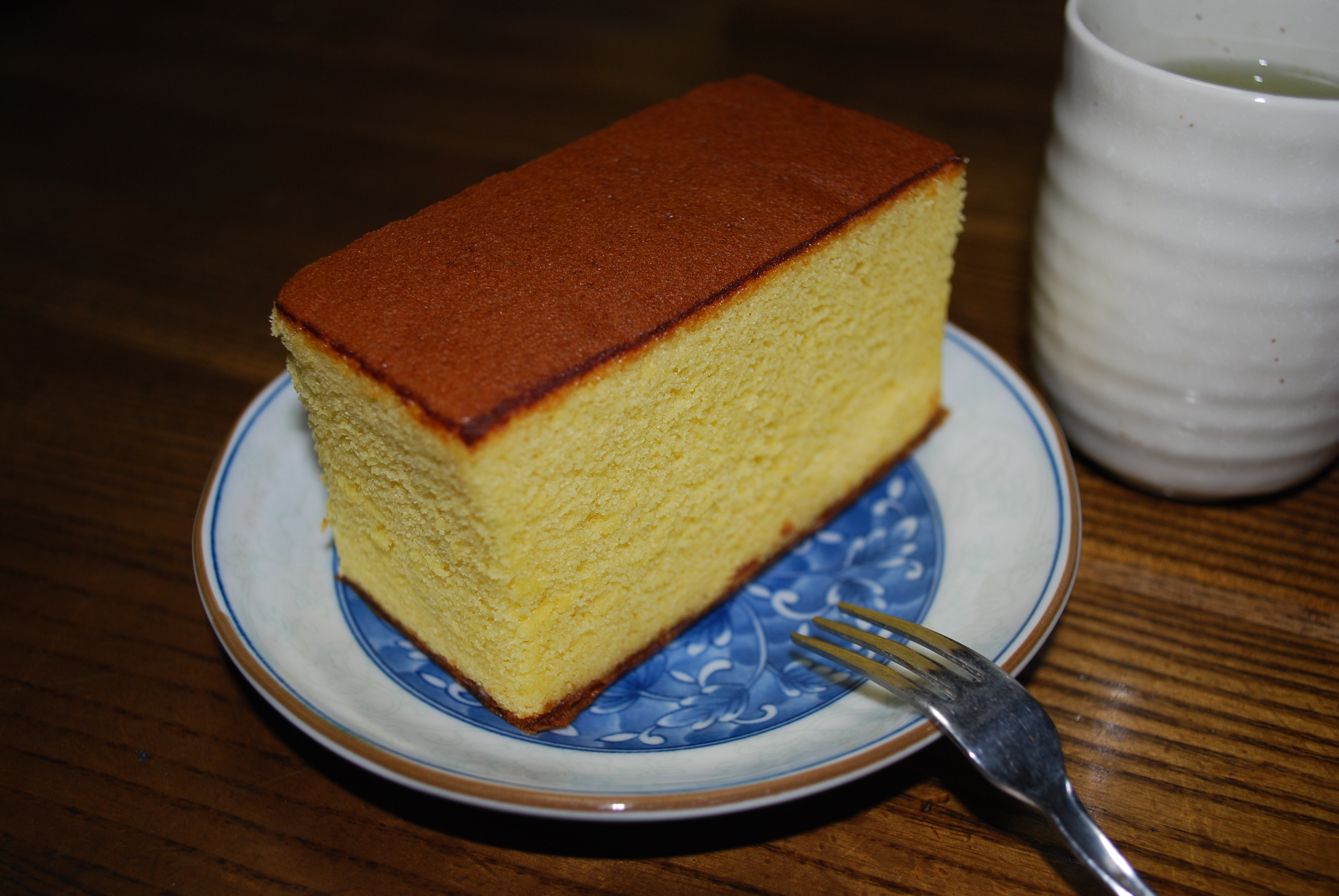
- Type: Sponge cake
- Place of origin: Japan
- Region or state: Japan, Taiwan, Portugal, Italy
- Main ingredients: Flour, sugar, eggs, mizuame

Castella (カステラ, kasutera; pronounced [kasɯ̥teɾa];) is a type of Japanese sponge cake and is known for its sweet, moist brioche-style flavour and texture. It is based on cakes introduced to Japan by Portuguese merchants in the 16th century. It was then popularized in the city of Nagasaki, where it is considered a specialty. Despite its foreign origins, it is considered a kind of wagashi, or traditional Japanese confectionery.

To suit the tastes of Japanese people, mizuame syrup was added to the sponge cake to make it more moist, and zarame (coarse sugar) was added to the bottom to give it a coarser texture. Castella is usually baked in square or rectangular molds, then cut and sold in long boxes, with the cake inside being approximately 27 cm (11 in) long.

== Etymology ==
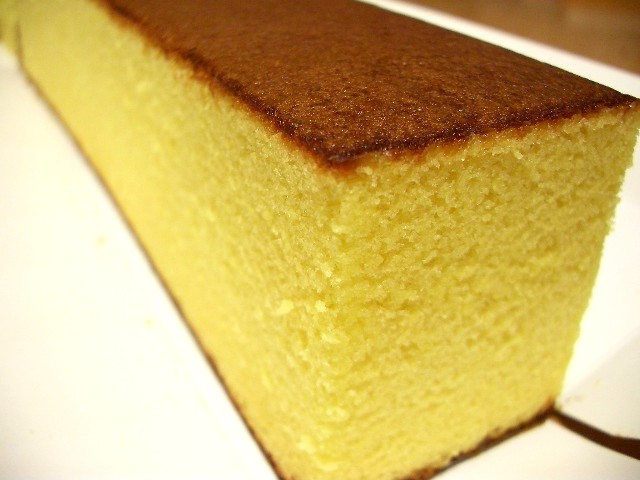
Close-up

The word "castella" is derived from the Portuguese term "Bolo de Castela", meaning "cake from Castile". Its closest relative is pão-de-ló, a Portuguese cake. Pão-de-ló can be in turned derived from the French Pain de lof or Gâteau de Savoie.

Similar European sponge cakes also reference Spain in their names, such as in Italian: Pan di Spagna, in Portuguese: Pão d’Espanha, in Romanian: Pandișpan, in Bulgarian: пандишпан (panishpan), in Serbian: патишпањ (pantispany), in Greek: Παντεσπάνι (pantéspasi), and in Turkish: Pandispanya. Castile was a former kingdom of Spain, comprising its north-central provinces, thus these names are quasi-synonymous with "bread from Castile".

== History ==
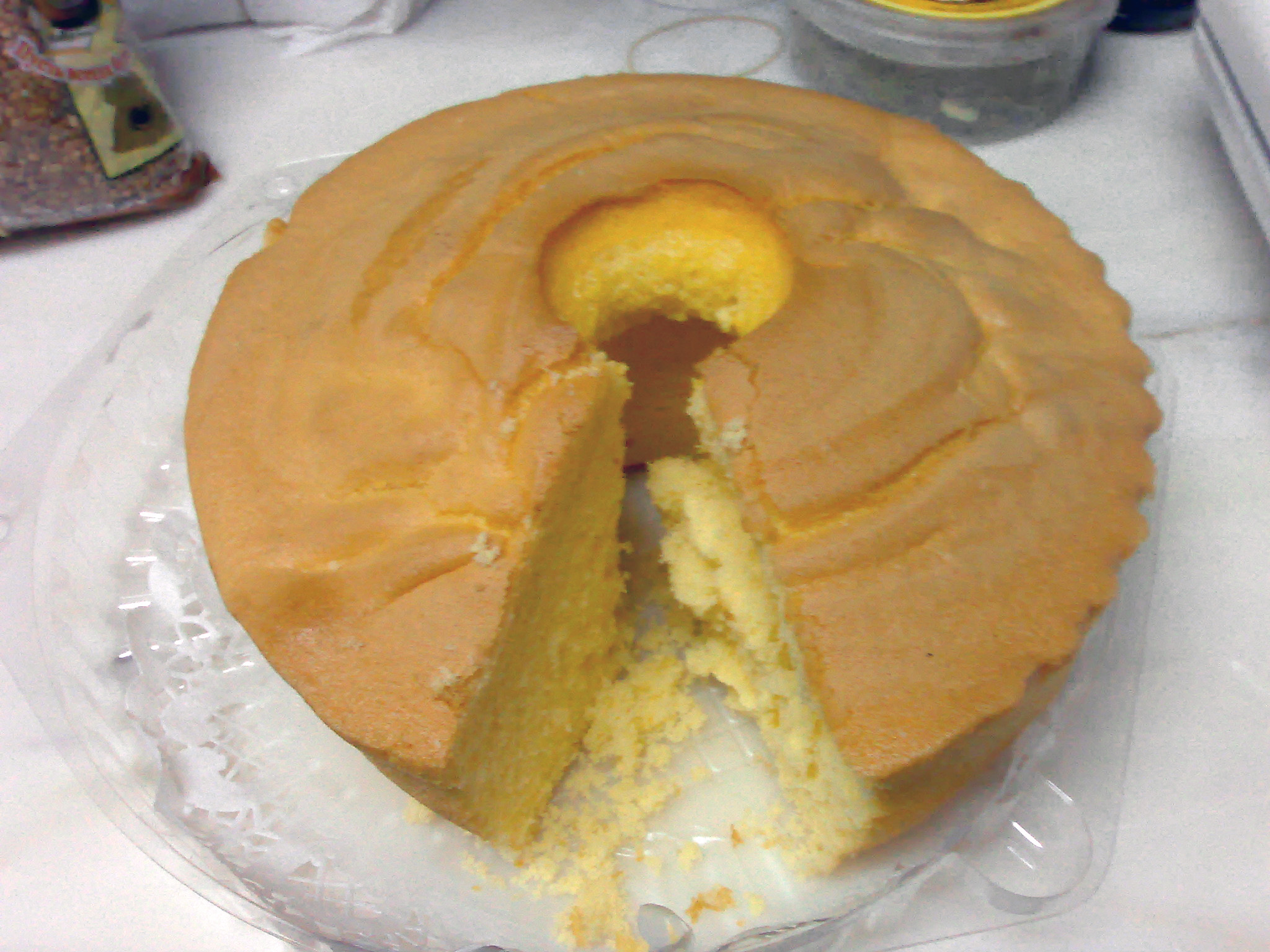
Pão-de-ló is castella's Portuguese ancestor

In the 16th century, the Portuguese reached Japan and soon started trade and missionary work. Nagasaki was then the only Japanese port open for foreign commerce. This exchange, called the Nanban trade, brought many new things to Japan including cakes. The Portuguese introduced things such as guns, tobacco, pumpkins, and cakes baked with wheat flour, eggs, and milk.

Castella cakes could be stored for a long time, and so were useful for the sailors who were out on the sea for months. In the Edo period, in part due to the cost of sugar, castella was a very expensive dessert to make despite the ingredients sold by the Portuguese. When the Emperor of Japan's envoy was invited, the Tokugawa shogunate presented them with castella cakes. Over the years, the taste changed to suit Japanese palates.

== Varieties ==
There are now many varieties made with ingredients such as powdered Matcha (green tea), chocolate, and honey. They may be molded in various shapes; a popular Japanese festival food is baby castella, a bite-sized version.

Siberia, a castella cake filled with yōkan (sweet bean jelly), was popular in the Meiji era; it had a resurgence since it appeared in the 2013 animated film The Wind Rises, by Hayao Miyazaki.

Castella mix is used for the pancakes that are sandwiched together with sweet adzuki bean paste in the confection known as dorayaki.

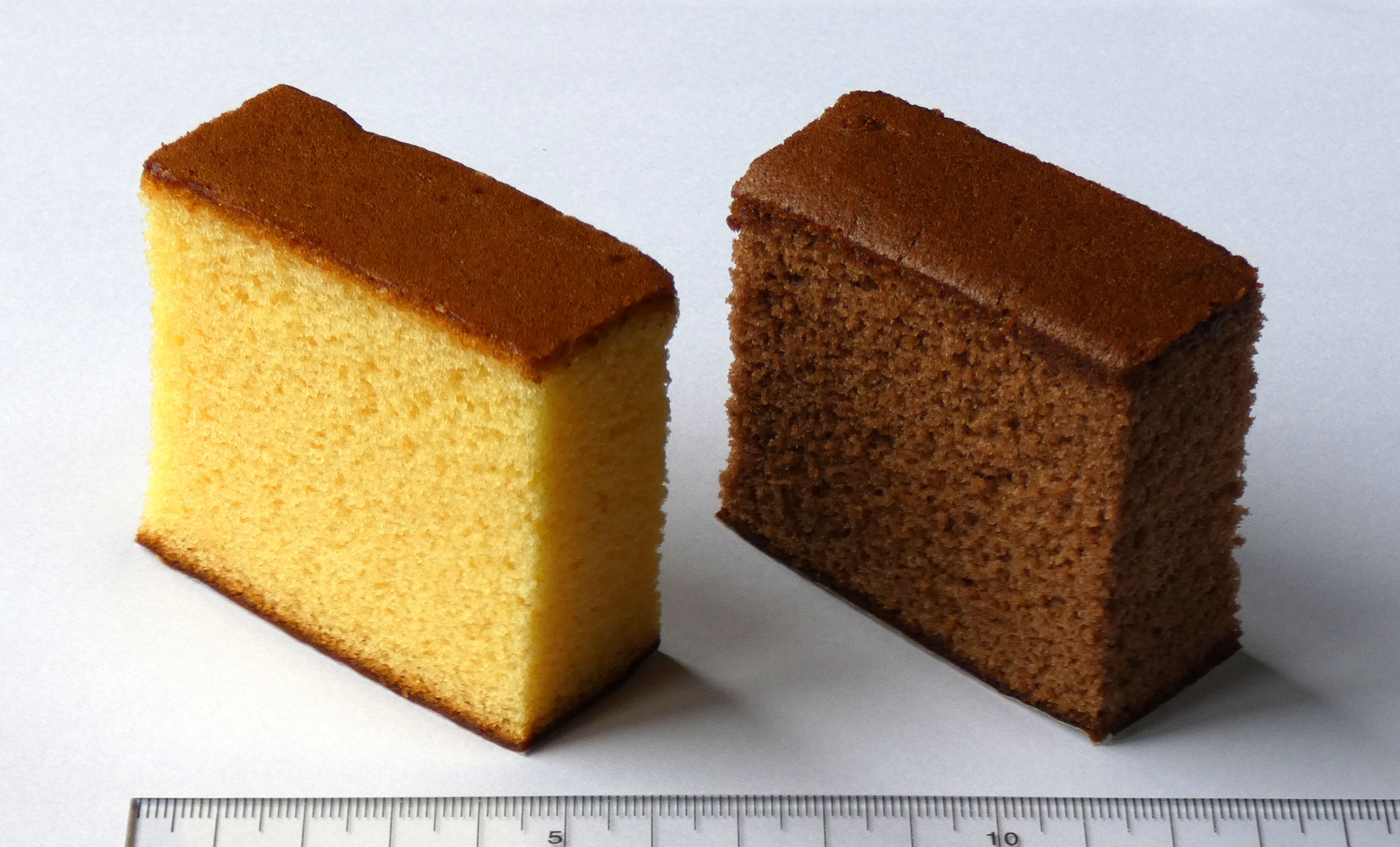
Regular and chocolate castella

Strawberry castella

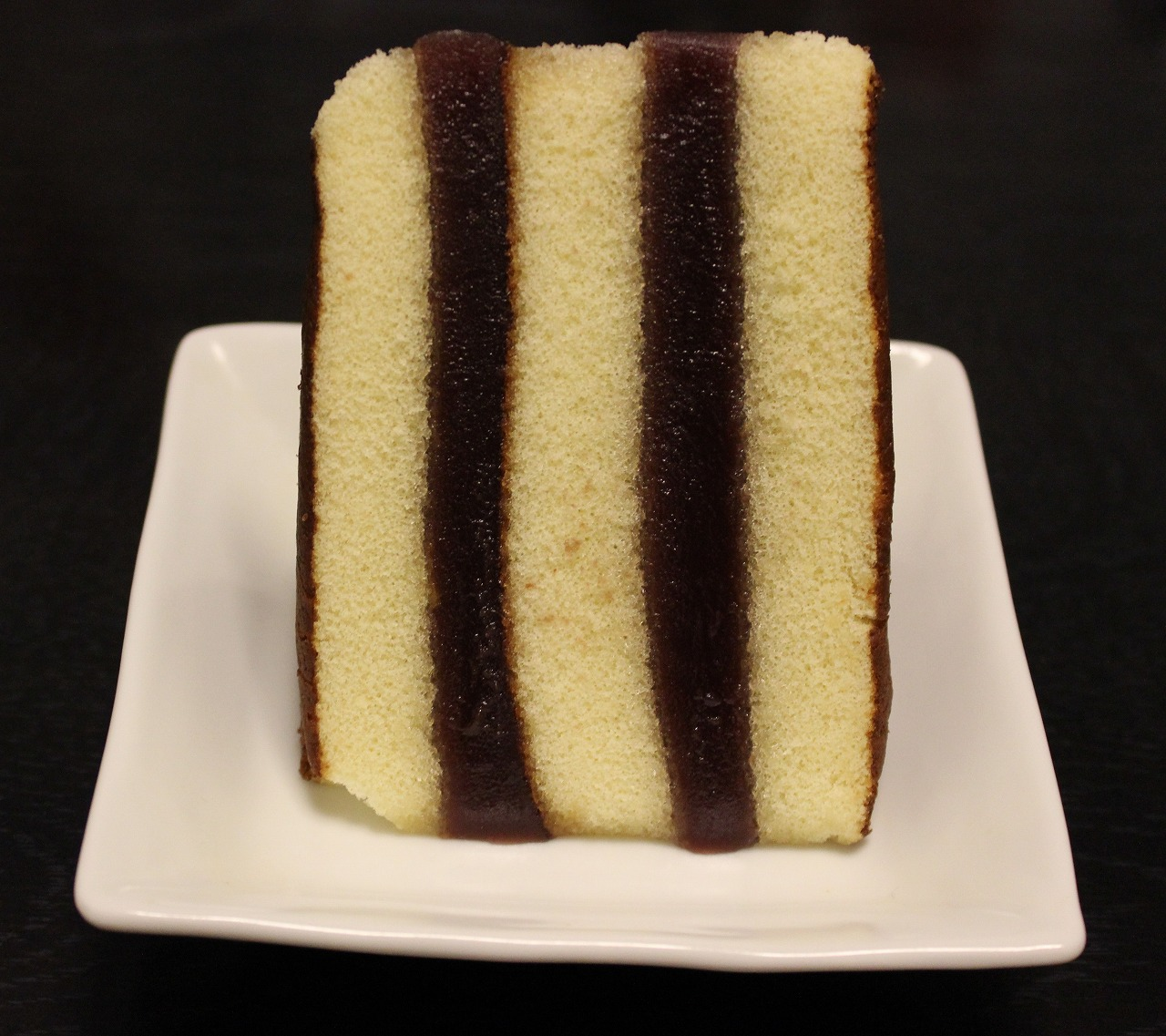
Castella with yōkan, called "Siberia" in Japan

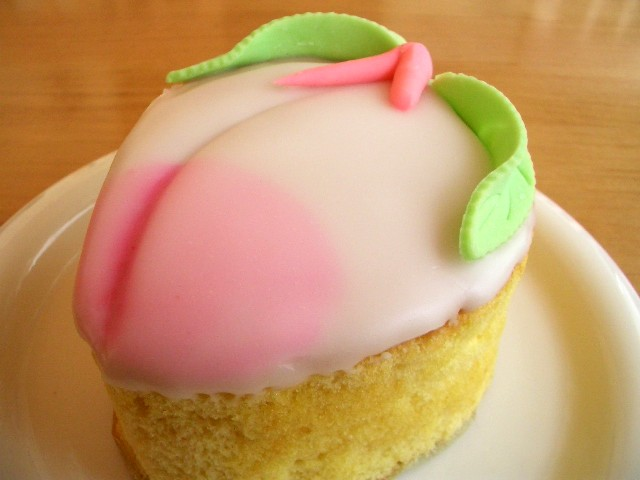
Peach castella

=== Taiwanese castella ===
Castella were first introduced to Taiwan during the age of Taiwan under Japanese rule. In 1968, Ye Yongqing, the owner of a Japanese bakery in Taipei named Nanbanto, partnered with the Japanese company Nagasaki Honpu to establish a castella cake business and bakery.

Taiwanese style castella (Chinese: 古早味蛋糕; pinyin: gǔzǎowèi dàngāo; lit. 'nostalgia flavour cake') is generally more soufflé-like than the Japanese variety, with a custard like center. A speciality of Tamsui is a simple pillow shaped castella cake. Taiwanese style castella has been introduced into Japan.

In South Korea, Taiwanese castella cake was briefly a fashionable food item until its popularity collapsed due to an oversaturation of cake shops and accusations of excess cooking oil in the cakes. The 2019 film Parasite briefly refers to the Taiwanese castella cake as the source of Geun-se's, and, by extension, Moon-gwang's financial troubles.

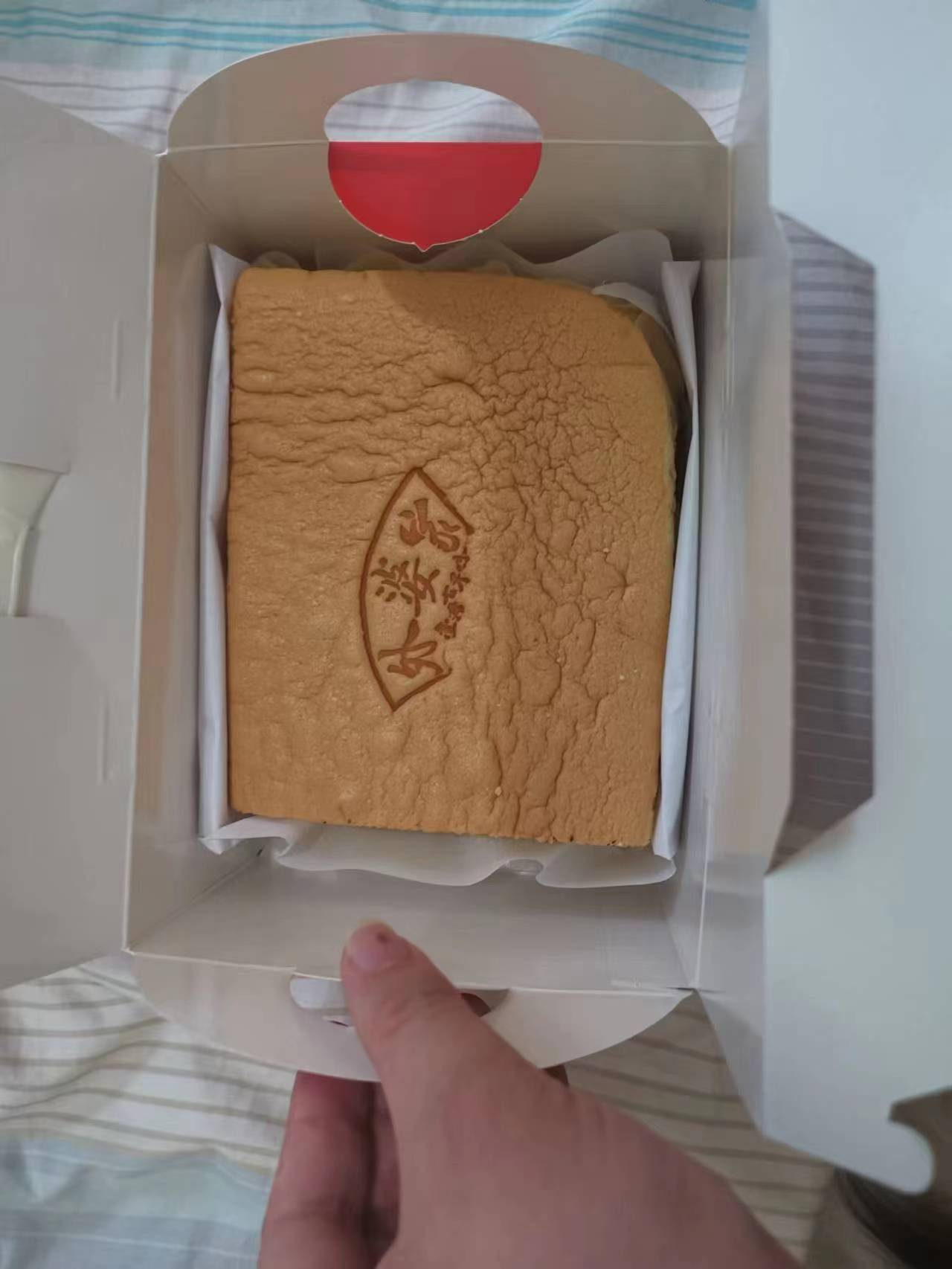

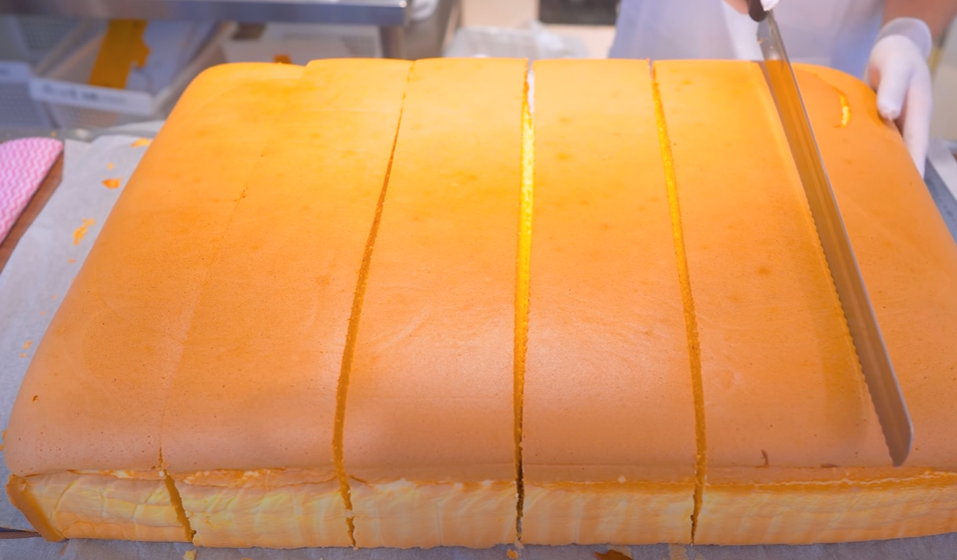

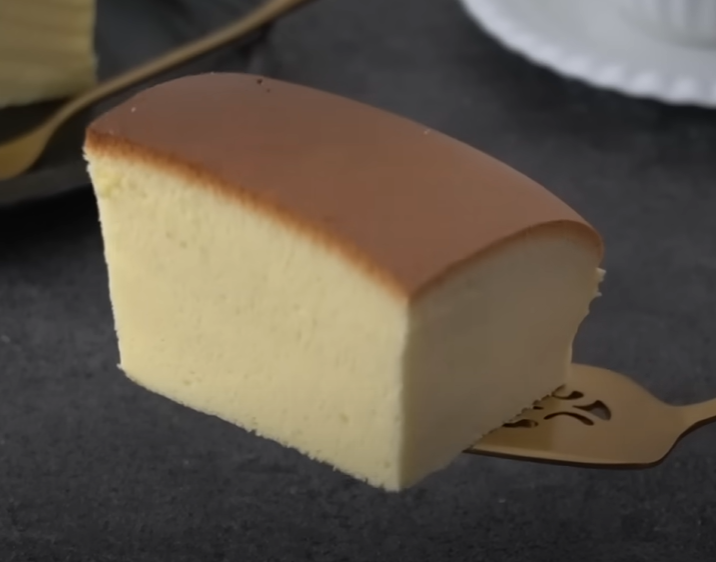

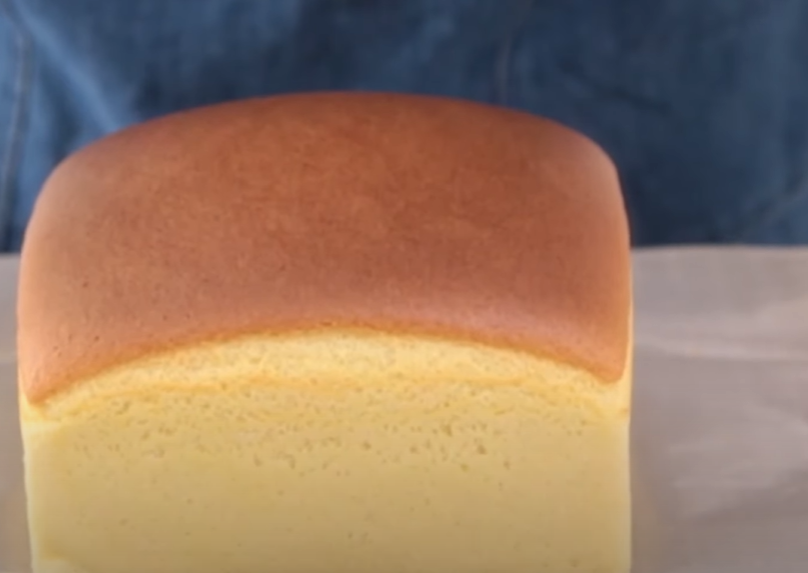

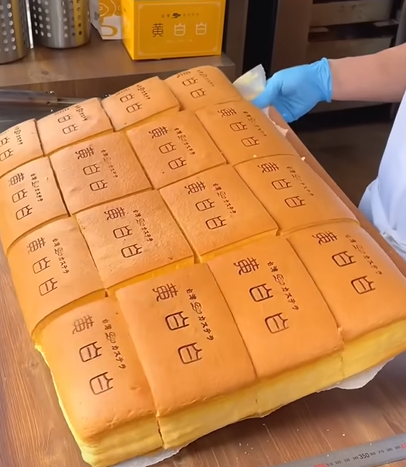

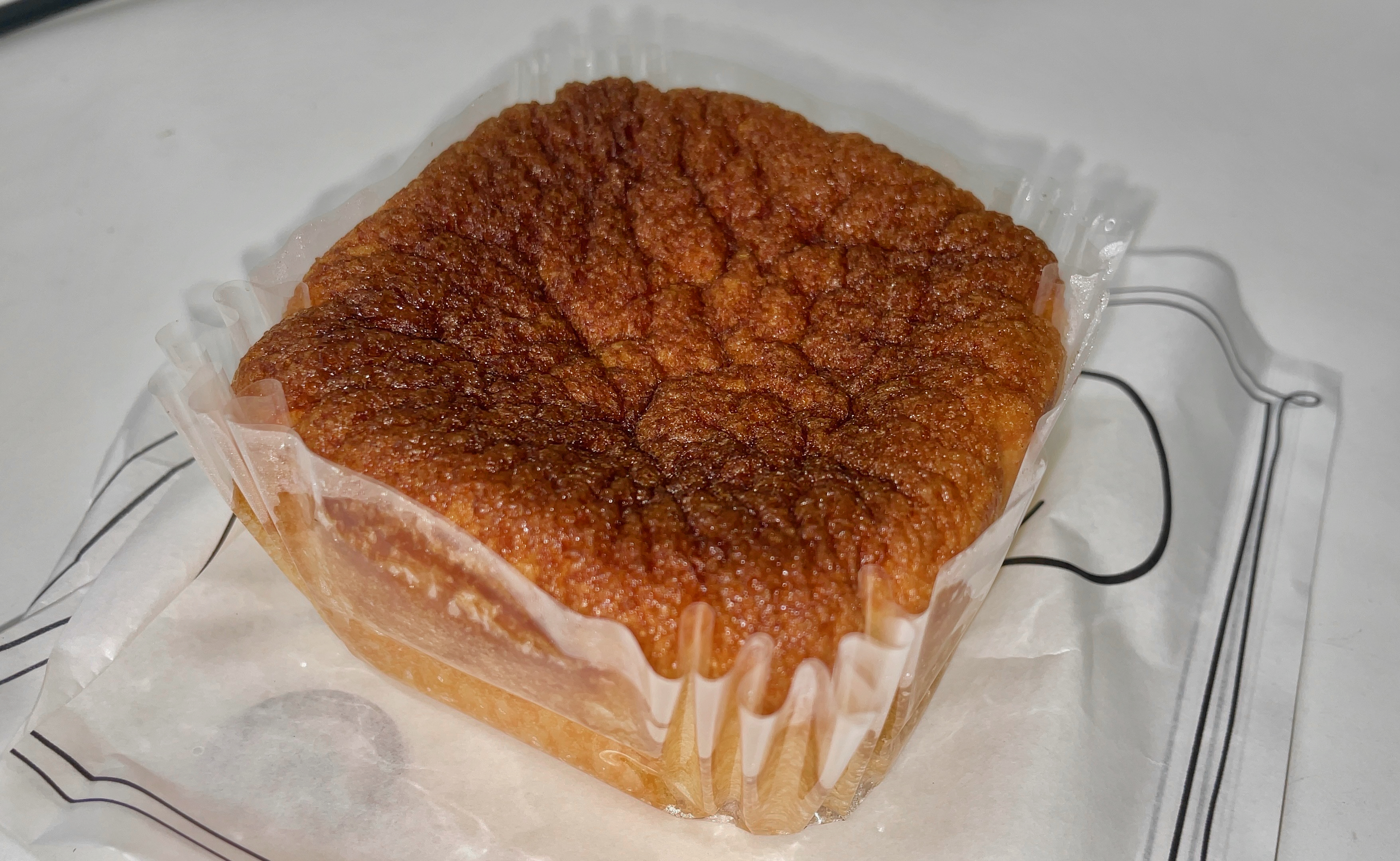

== Popular culture ==
In Tomihiko Morimi's novel The Tatami Galaxy (四畳半神話大系, Yojōhan Shinwa Taikei) and its anime adaptation, castella cake is a recurring element. The protagonist, a Kyoto University student, often encounters slices of castella, which serve as a symbol of his university life and the choices he faces in various parallel universes. The presence of castella highlights its cultural significance in Japan and its association with moments of reflection in the narrative, emphasizing the impact of different life paths on his experiences. In 'What you are looking for is in the library' by Michiko Aoyama, Tomoka, strives to make the castella cake she read about in a favourite childhood book called Guri & Gura.

== Main manufacturers ==
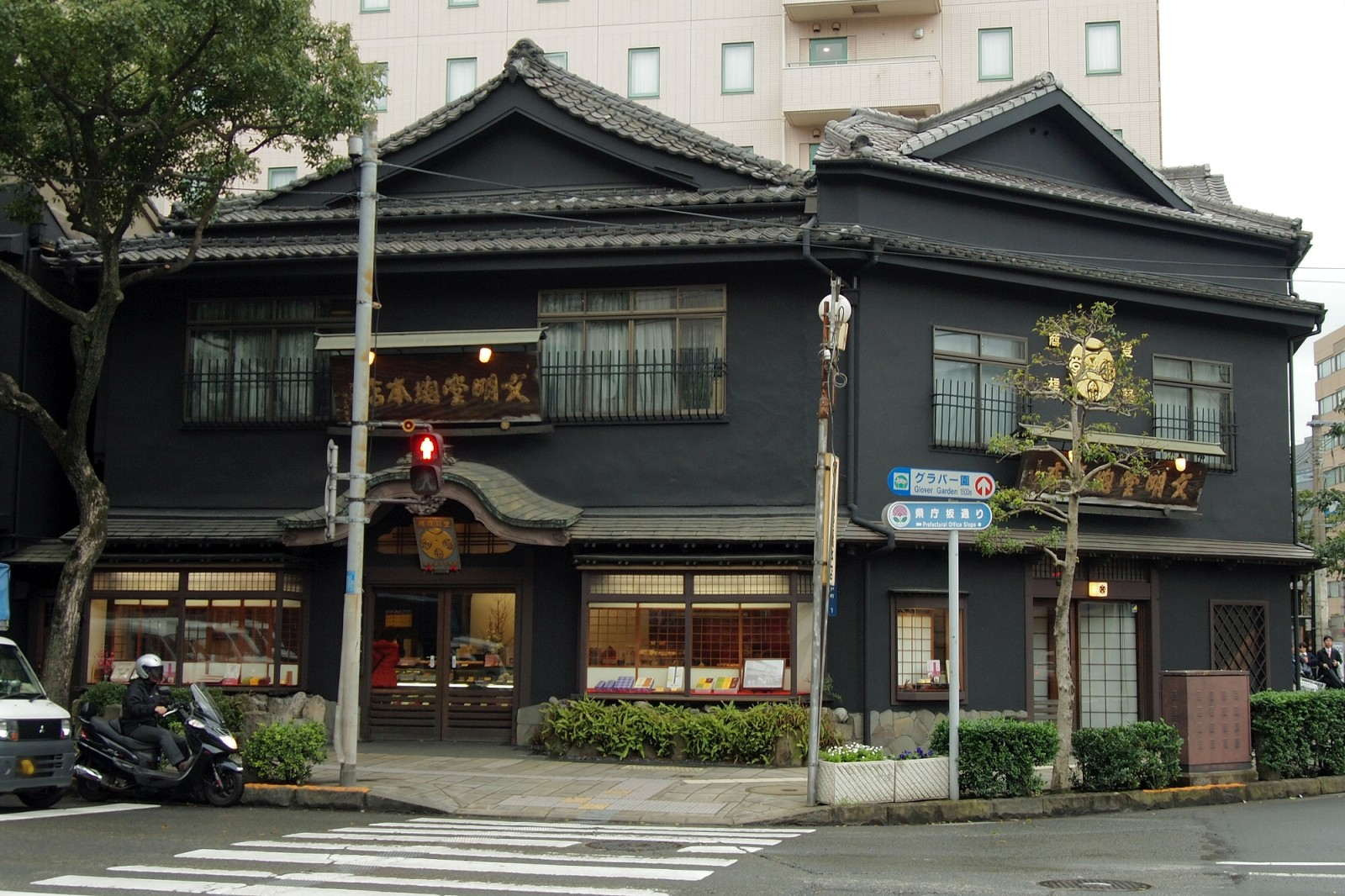
Headquarters of Bunmeidō, a major castella bakery in Nagasaki

- Founded in 1624: Castella Honke Fukusaya (Nagasaki City, Nagasaki Prefecture)
- Founded in 1681: Shooken (Nagasaki City, Nagasaki Prefecture)
- Founded in 1900 (Meiji 33): Bunmeidō (Nagasaki City, Nagasaki Prefecture) Known for the phrase "castella first, telephone number second" and in the Kanto region, commercials of bear puppets dancing can-can dances.

== See also ==
- Gairaigo
- Japanese words of Portuguese origin
- Baumkuchen
