= Saint Severin =

Saint Severin or Saint-Séverin may refer to:

== Churches ==
- Basilica of St. Severin, Cologne
- Saint-Séverin, Paris, in the Latin Quarter of Paris
- St. Severin's Old Log Church, on the National Register of Historic Places in Pennsylvania
- St. Severin, Keitum church on Sylt, Germany
- St. Severin, a church in Eilendorf, Germany

== People ==
- Severinus, Exuperius, and Felician (died 170), saints
- Severinus of Bordeaux (died 420), saint
- Severinus of Cologne (c. 320 – 404), saint
- Severinus of Noricum (410s–482), saint
- Severinus Boethius (c. 477 – 524), Roman consul and philosopher (and saint)
- Severinus of Sanseverino (died 550), saint
- Galéas de Saint-Séverin (c. 1460 – 1525), Italian-French condottiere and grand écuyer de France

== Places ==
- Saint-Séverin, a commune in the Charente department in southwestern France
- Saint-Séverin-sur-Boutonne, a commune in the Charente-Maritime department in southwestern France
- Saint-Séverin-d'Estissac, a commune in the Dordogne department in Aquitaine in southwestern France
- Saint-Séverin, Chaudière-Appalaches, Quebec, a parish in the Municipalité régionale de comté Robert-Cliche in Canada
- Saint-Séverin, Mauricie, Quebec, a parish municipality
- Saint-Séverin-en-Condroz, a village in Wallonia, Belgium

== Other uses ==
- Rue Saint-Séverin, Paris

== See also ==
- St. Severin's Abbey, Kaufbeuren, Germany
- Severin (disambiguation)
- Severin (given name)
