= Sibiryak (rural locality) =

Sibiryak (Russian: Сибиря́к) is the name of several rural localities in Russia:

- Sibiryak, Irkutsk Oblast, a settlement in Tulunsky District of Irkutsk Oblast
- Sibiryak, Krasnoyarsk Krai, a settlement in Uspensky Selsoviet of Rybinsky District of Krasnoyarsk Krai
- Sibiryak, Bolotninsky District, Novosibirsk Oblast, a settlement in Bolotninsky District, Novosibirsk Oblast
- Sibiryak, Cherepanovsky District, Novosibirsk Oblast, a settlement in Cherepanovsky District, Novosibirsk Oblast
- Sibiryak, Tatarsky District, Novosibirsk Oblast, a settlement in Tatarsky District, Novosibirsk Oblast
- Sibiryak, Tyumen Oblast, a settlement in Priirtyshsky Rural Okrug of Tobolsky District of Tyumen Oblast
