= Severin Hallauer =

Swiss artist (born 1996)

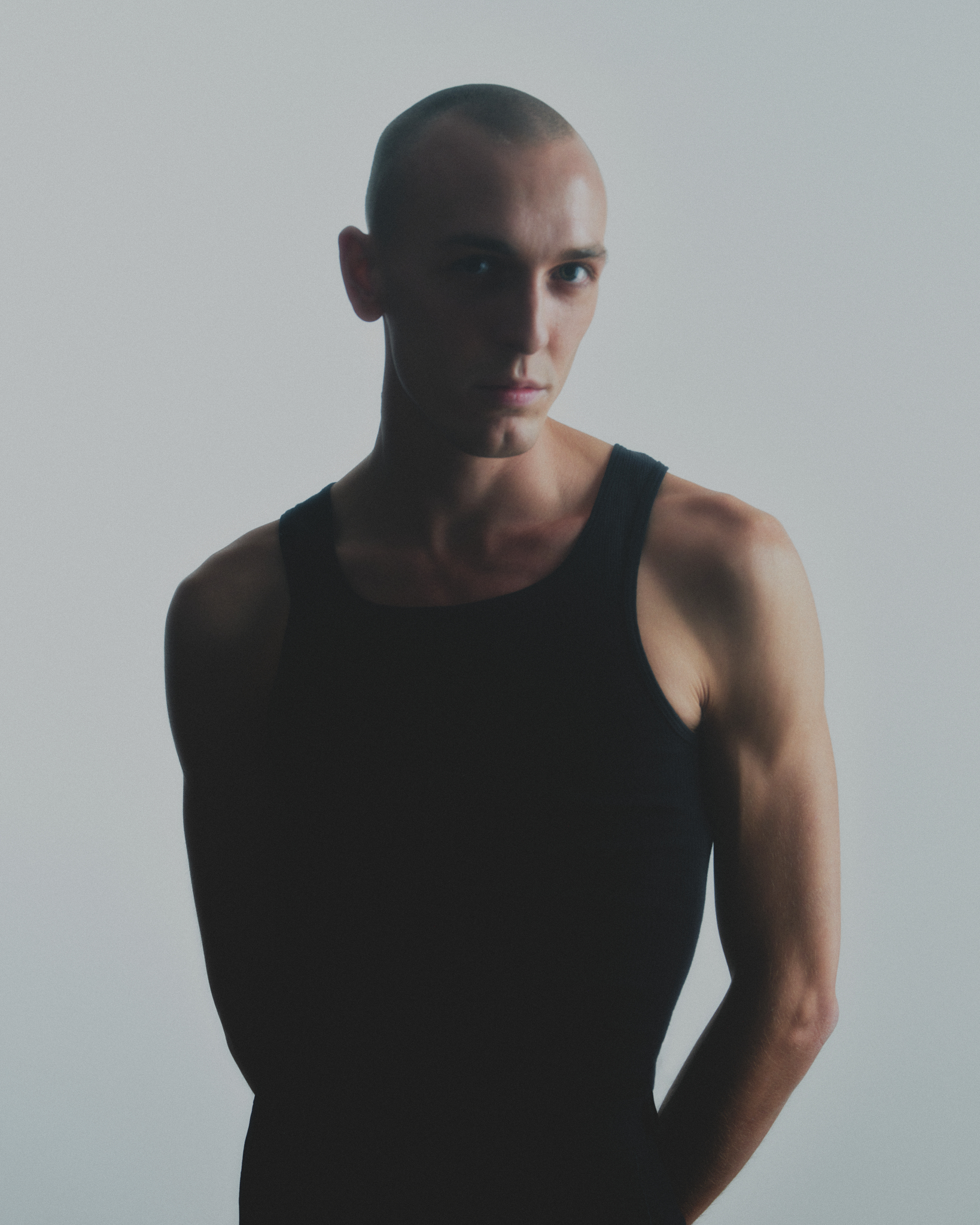
- Hallauer in 2022
- Born: Severin Hallauer; 26 September 1996 (age 29); Basel, Switzerland
- Education: Schule für Gestaltung Basel; Zurich University of the Arts(BA); State Academy of Fine Arts Stuttgart(Jankowski Klasse)
- Style: Installation art; video art; performance art; multimedia art; sculpture
- Website: www.severinhallauer.com

Severin Hallauer (born 1996 in Basel, Switzerland) is a Swiss visual artist and actor living in Mexico City and Zurich.

== Biography ==
Hallauer was born in 1996 in Basel and grew up in the rural Northwestern Switzerland. From 2013 to 2014, he completed the preparatory course at the Schule für Gestaltung Basel. In 2014, Hallauer presented an art action while Art Basel on the Messeplatz that resulted in police intervention.

After completing the preparatory course, Hallauer worked as an actor at the Theater Basel. From 2015 to 2019, Hallauer completed the Bachelor of Fine Arts at the Zurich University of the Arts and in 2018 in the Jankowski class of the State Academy of Fine Arts Stuttgart. His early performance works often involved public interventions and the use of his own body as an artistic medium, including a 2015 performance connected to Swiss military conscription, to which he appeared naked and painted white and 2019 performance presented during Sofia Art Week in Bulgaria.

Severin Hallauer received the 2021 Award for Visual Arts from the Canton of Solothurn. Also in 2021, Hallauer moved to Mexico, where he has since lived and worked between Mexico City and Zurich.

In addition to his work as a visual artist, Severin Hallauer also appears as an actor and model. He appeared in the short film Heart Fruit directed by Kim Allamand, screened at the Locarno Film Festival and other festivals. In 2018, Hallauer performed in The Divine Comedy by Rirkrit Tiravanija at the Fondation Beyeler.

== Artistic work ==
Hallauer's artistic practice encompasses installation, sculpture, video, photography, text, and performance. His multidisciplinary works often combine physical objects, spatial arrangements, and audiovisual elements. His practice examines themes including inheritance, memory, belonging, vulnerability, and personal and collective experience. Recent bodies of work have explored questions surrounding migration, intergenerational transmission, and the relationship between intimacy and social structures.

== Quotes ==
Obstacles are challenges in which one can fail iconically at best. Creating art means learning to fail better.

— Severin Hallauer

== Criticism ==
Severin Hallauer's work polarizes and receives both recognition and critical feedback. Some critics praise his work as a bold and profound engagement with social and philosophical issues. Some critics have questioned the role of provocation and self-exposure in Hallauer's performance practice. In 2024, Hallauer responded to this criticism in an interview, saying, "Scandal plays no role in my work. I don't sit in my studio imagining how I can provoke my fellow humans. It's an uncompromising honesty that I demand from my art. […] If viewers feel provoked by my art, it says more about them than about me and my art."

== Awards ==
- 2021: Visual Arts Award of the Canton of Solothurn

== Exhibitions (selection) ==
- 2018: Academiae – Youth Art Biennial, Franzensfeste
- 2019: Das Unbegreifliche Schweigen Der Welt, Gasträume 2019, Zurich
- 2019: what do you want me to believe in?, Æther Art Space, Sofia Art Week, Sofia
- 2021: InRelation, I see you now, Schlumpf, Riehen
- 2021: Loving Switzerland, Künstlerhaus S11, Kantonale Förderpreise 2021, Solothurn
- 2022: entrée&hommage, M54, Basel
- 2023: Eros Y Ambigüedad, Galeria Luis Adelantado, Mexico City
- 2023: Eros Y Ambigüedad, Galeria Revuelta, Mexico City
- 2024: Radical Joy, Riverfront Art Gallery, Yonkers Public Library, Yonkers, New York
- 2024: Kunstpause 2024, Chollerhalle, Zug
- 2026: New Skies, Induction Gallery, Los Angeles
- 2026: ForRest, Centerfold, Los Angeles
- 2026: Detlef, Art Week Basel

== Performances (selection) ==
- 2015: L‘individue neutre, Rekrutierungszentrum, Windisch
- 2016: In between the complexes, ACT Performance Festival 16, Théâtre de L‘Usine, Geneva
- 2017: J’ai tué mon ami, ACT Performance Festival 17, Merian Gärten, Basel
- 2017: reflection, Kunstfreitag, Kunstverein, Friedrichshafen
- 2019: duality, Sommerfest, Kunsthalle Bern
- 2019: nude and monument, Sofia Art Week, Æther Art Space Sofia
- 2019: redshift, Kunstraum Aarau
- 2020: I just want to be (in)visible, Queer Sex Health Festival, Kosmos, Zurich
- 2020: Surfaces, Bagno Popolare, Baden
- 2020: Unos Pro Omnibus Omnes Pro Oeconomia, Paradeplatz, Zurich

== Filmography (selection) ==
- 2017: Carvel – Fall For Me (Music video)
- 2017: Len Sander – Woman on the Run (Music video)
- 2017: Space Tourists – Dagger Child (Music video)
- 2018: Enoxaiar (Short film)
- 2019: The Burden Remains – Fluid (Music film)
- 2021: Heart Fruit (Short film)
- 2021: Livia Rita – Muscle of Freedom (Music video)

== Theater (selection) ==
- 2015: Hamlet, Theater Basel
- 2016: Médée, Opera, Theater Basel
- 2017: Es war ein mal ein Einsam, Theater in allen Räumen 17, Theater der Künste, Zurich
- 2018: Lachsfrühstück für 1 Person, Theater in allen Räumen 18, Theater der Künste, Zurich
- 2019: I say I shoot you. you are dead, Gruppe CIS, Theater Rampe, Stuttgart, Sophiensääle, Berlin
- 2020: Abschied, Festival der Liebe VI, Kulturhaus Helferei, Zurich
