= Sibirsky, Voronezh Oblast =

Sibirsky Сибирский
- Settlement
- Location within Voronezh Oblast Location within Russia
- Coordinates: 50°47′N 39°01′E
- Country: Russia
- Region: Voronezh Oblast
- District: Ostrogozhsky District
- Time zone: UTC+3:00

Sibirsky (Russian: Сибирский) is a rural locality (a settlement) in Gnilovskoye Rural Settlement, Ostrogozhsky District, Voronezh Oblast, Russia. The population was 54 as of 2010. There are 2 streets.

== Geography ==
Sibirsky is located 14 km southwest of Ostrogozhsk (the district's administrative centre) by road. Novaya Melnitsa is the nearest rural locality.
