= Severina =

Severina may refer to:

== People ==
Given name

- Severina, or Ulpia Severina (fl. 270–275), Roman empress
- Severina de Orosa (1890–1984), Filipino physician and Hispanist writer
- Severina (singer), Severina Vučković (born 1972), Croatian singer
  - Severina (album), a 1989 album by Severina
- Severina Lajtman, Croatian actress

Surname

- Maria Severina (born 1995), Russian chess player

== Places ==
- Santa Severina, a town and comune in the province of Crotone, in the Calabria region of southern Italy

== Arts and entertainment ==
=== Literature ===
- Severina (Silone), a 1981 posthumous novella by Ignazio Silone
- Severina (Rey Rosa), a 2011 novella by Rodrigo Rey Rosa

=== Music ===
- "Severina", a single from the 1986 album God's Own Medicine by The Mission

== Other ==
- 9716 Severina, an asteroid

== See also ==
- Severin (disambiguation)
- Severine (disambiguation)
