= Yōkan =

Type of wagashi

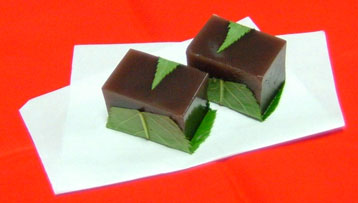
- Type: Wagashi
- Place of origin: Japan
- Main ingredients: Agar, sugar, red bean paste or white kidney bean paste

Yōkan (羊羹) is a wagashi made of red bean paste, agar, and sugar. It is usually sold in a block form, and eaten in slices. There are two main types: neri yōkan and mizu yōkan. Mizu means "water", and indicates that it is made with more water than usual. Mizu yōkan is usually chilled and eaten in the summer, however in Fukui prefecture it is customarily eaten in winter.

== Types ==
Although yōkan found in Japan and abroad is typically made with red bean paste, yōkan made from white kidney bean paste (しろあん, 白餡, shiro an) is also relatively common. This type of yōkan is milky and translucent with a much milder flavour than that made of red bean paste. As such, it can be effectively flavoured and coloured by using green tea powder.

Yōkan may also contain chopped chestnuts, persimmons, whole sweetened azuki beans, figs, and sweet potato (imo yōkan), among other additions. Sugar can also be replaced with honey, dark brown sugar, or molasses to alter the taste of the yōkan produced. There is also shio yōkan, which uses small amounts of salt.

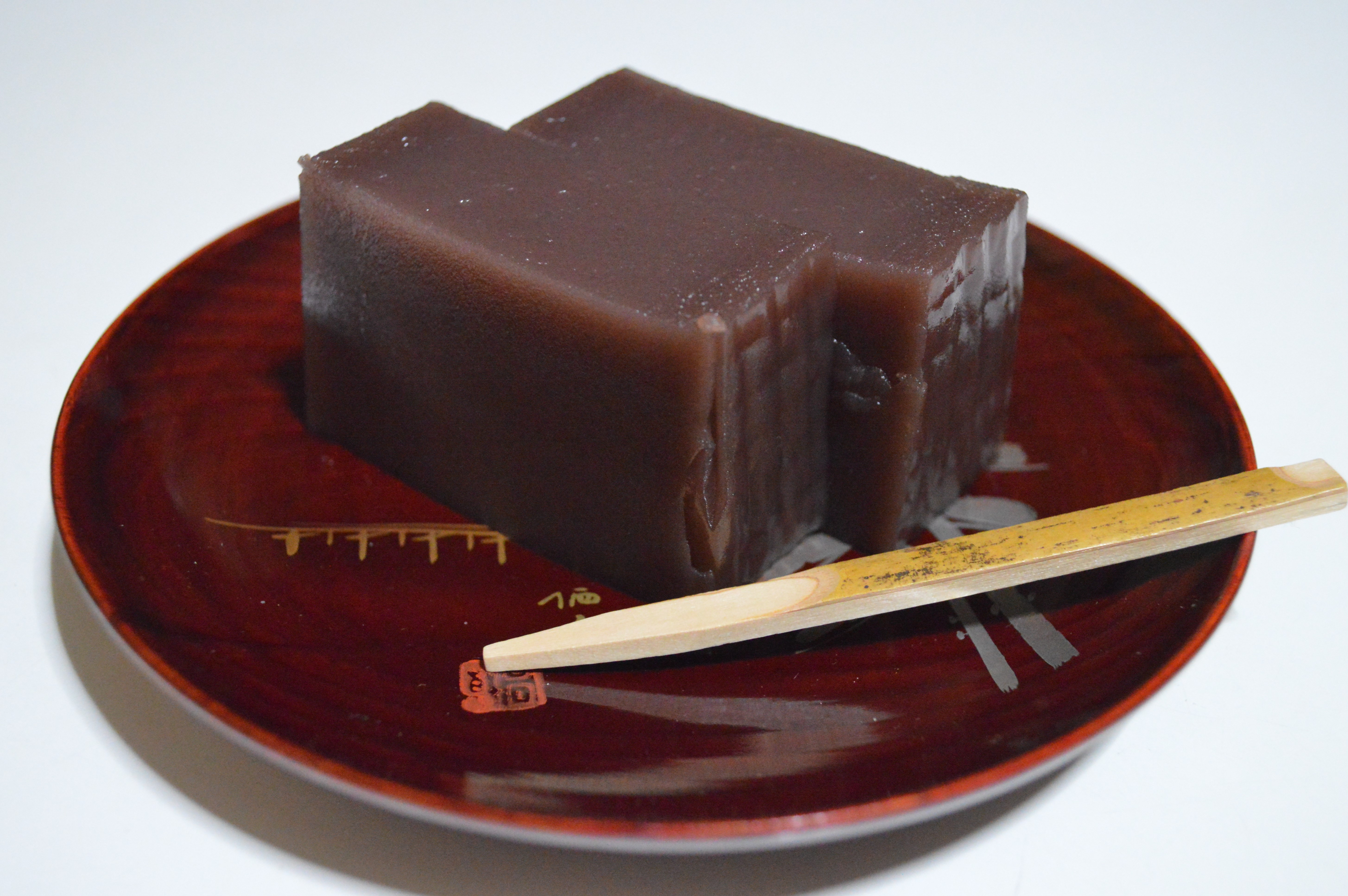
Azuki bean paste yōkan

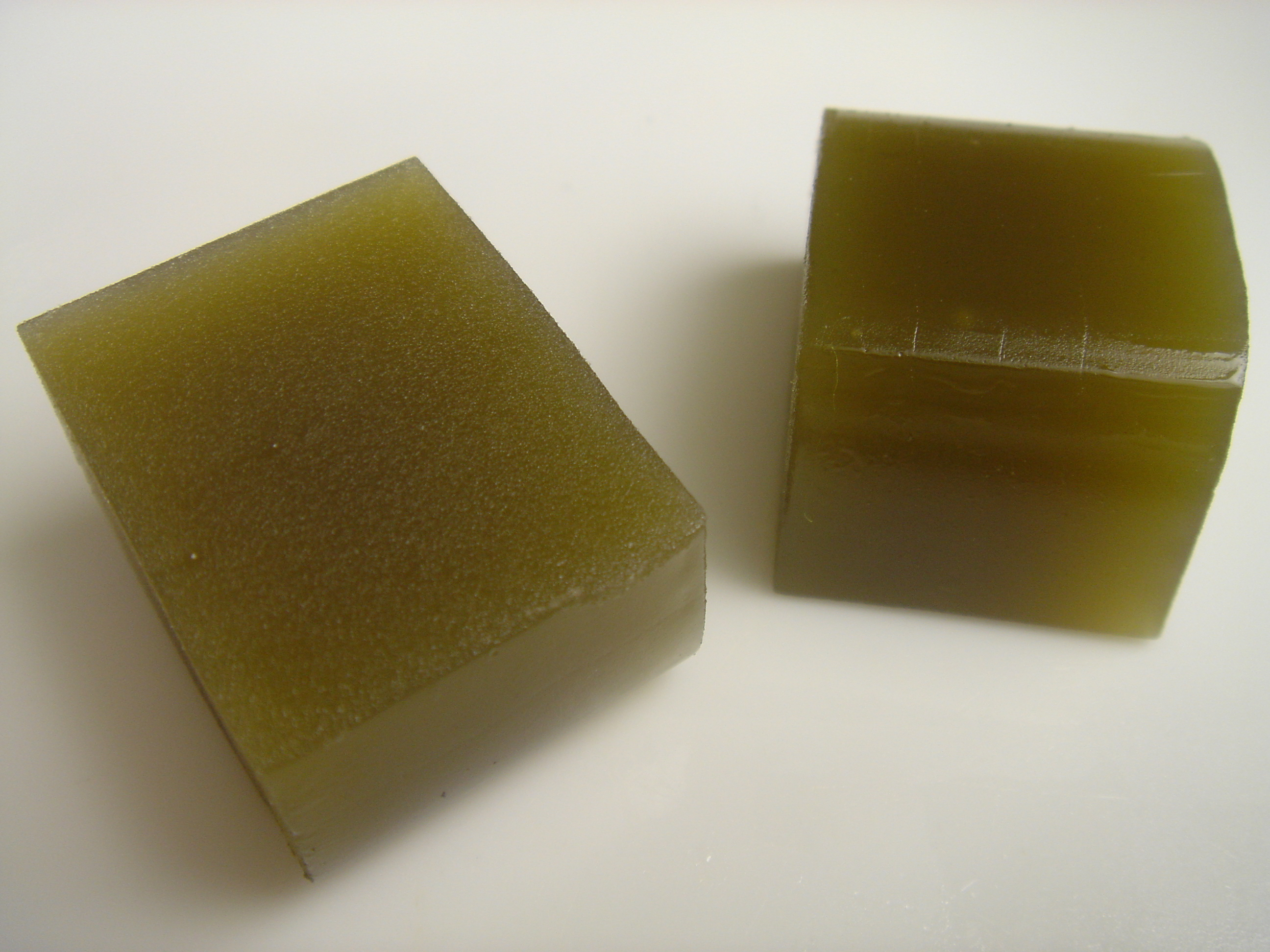
Green tea yōkan

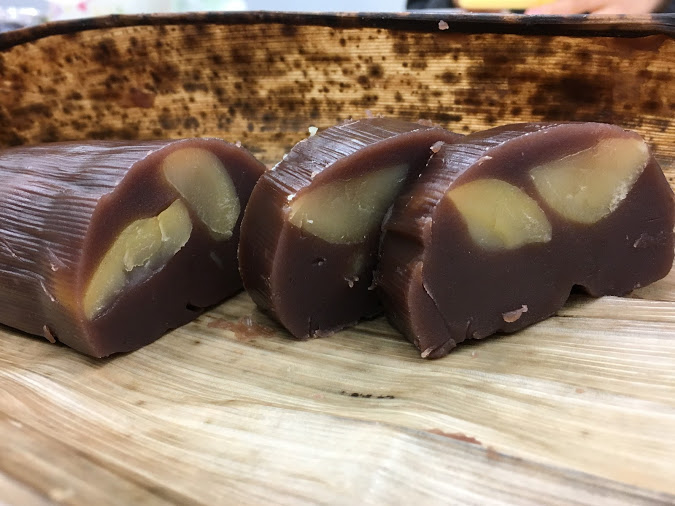
Chestnut yōkan

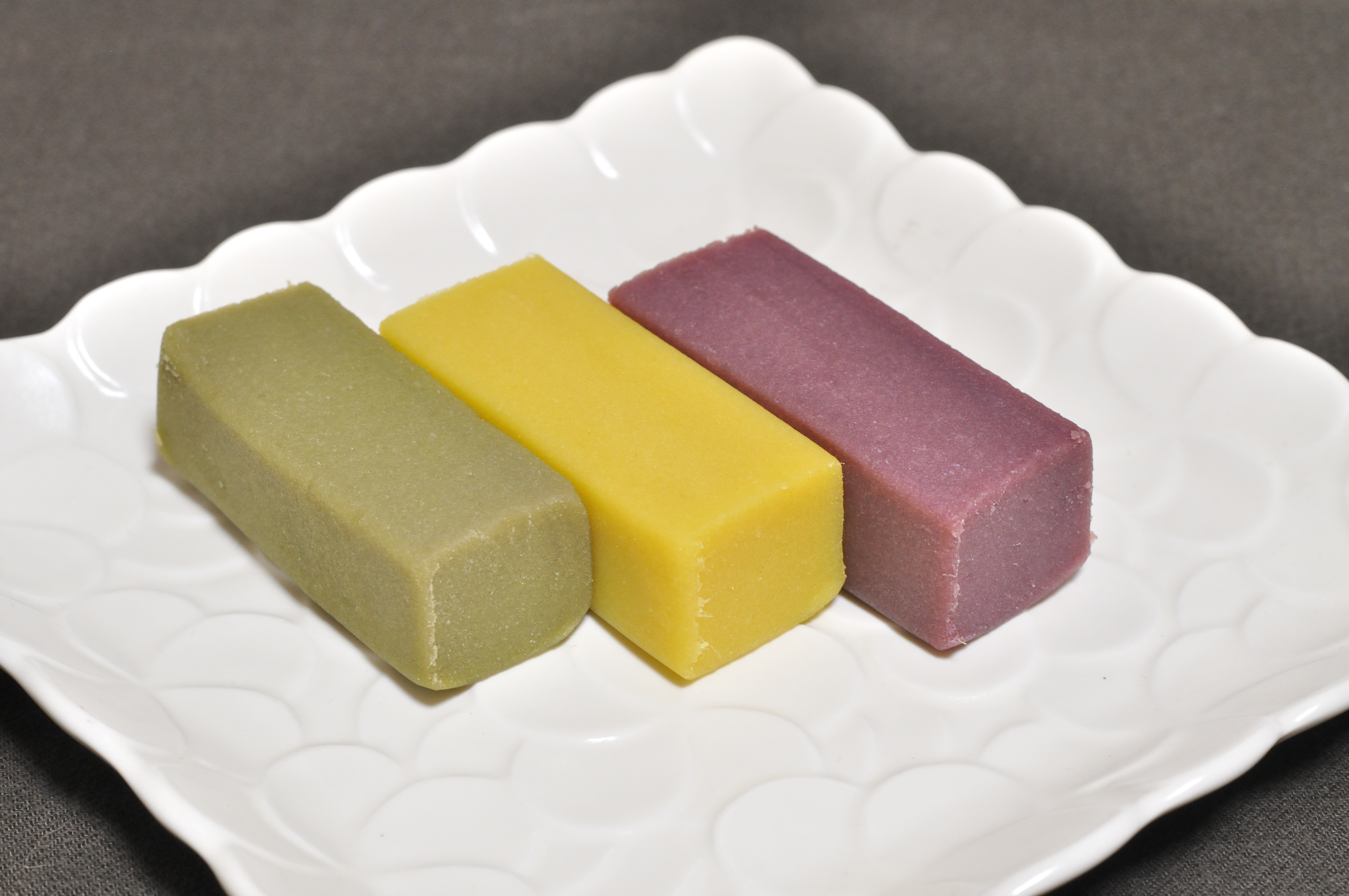
Sweet potato yōkan

== History ==
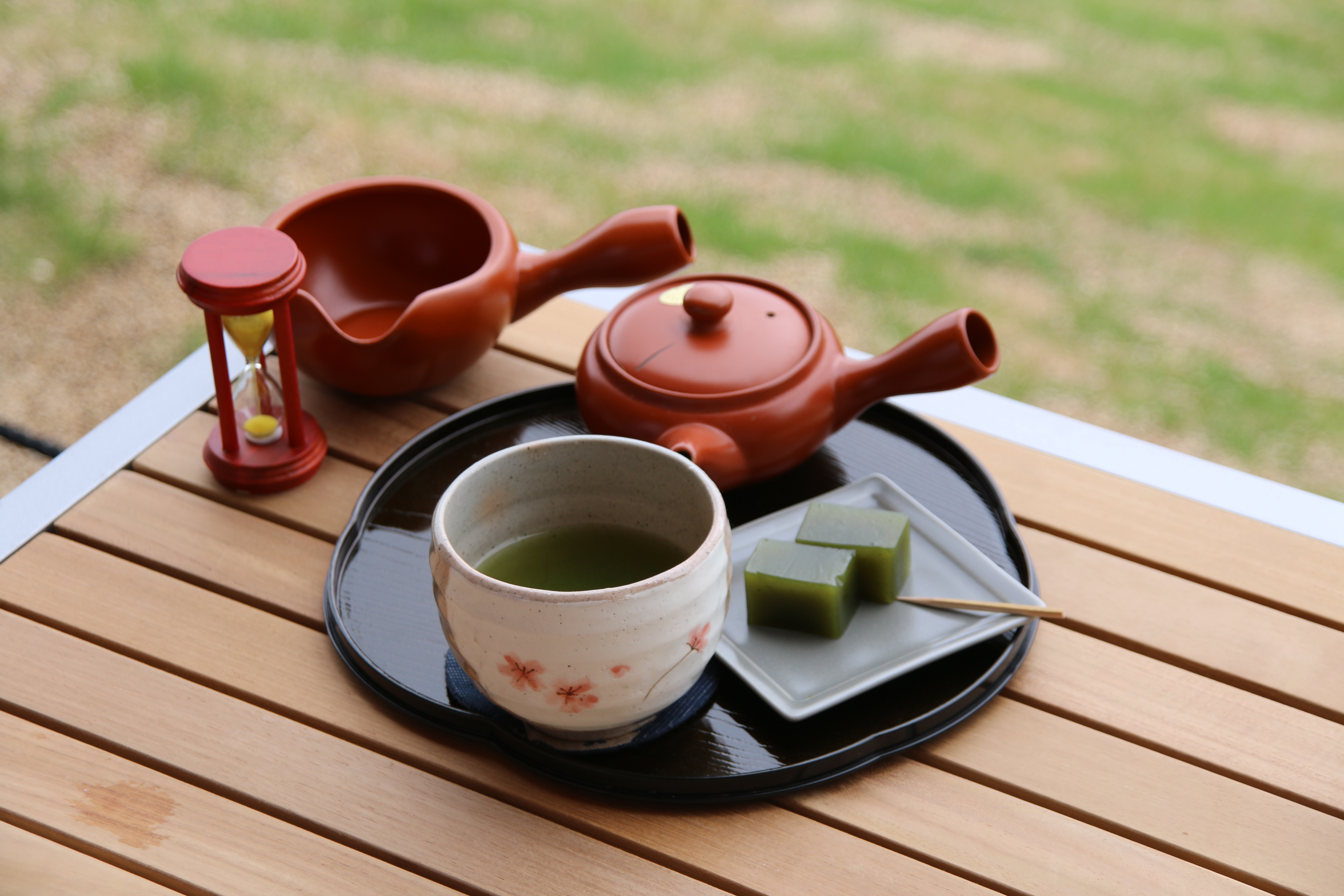
Yōkan with green tea

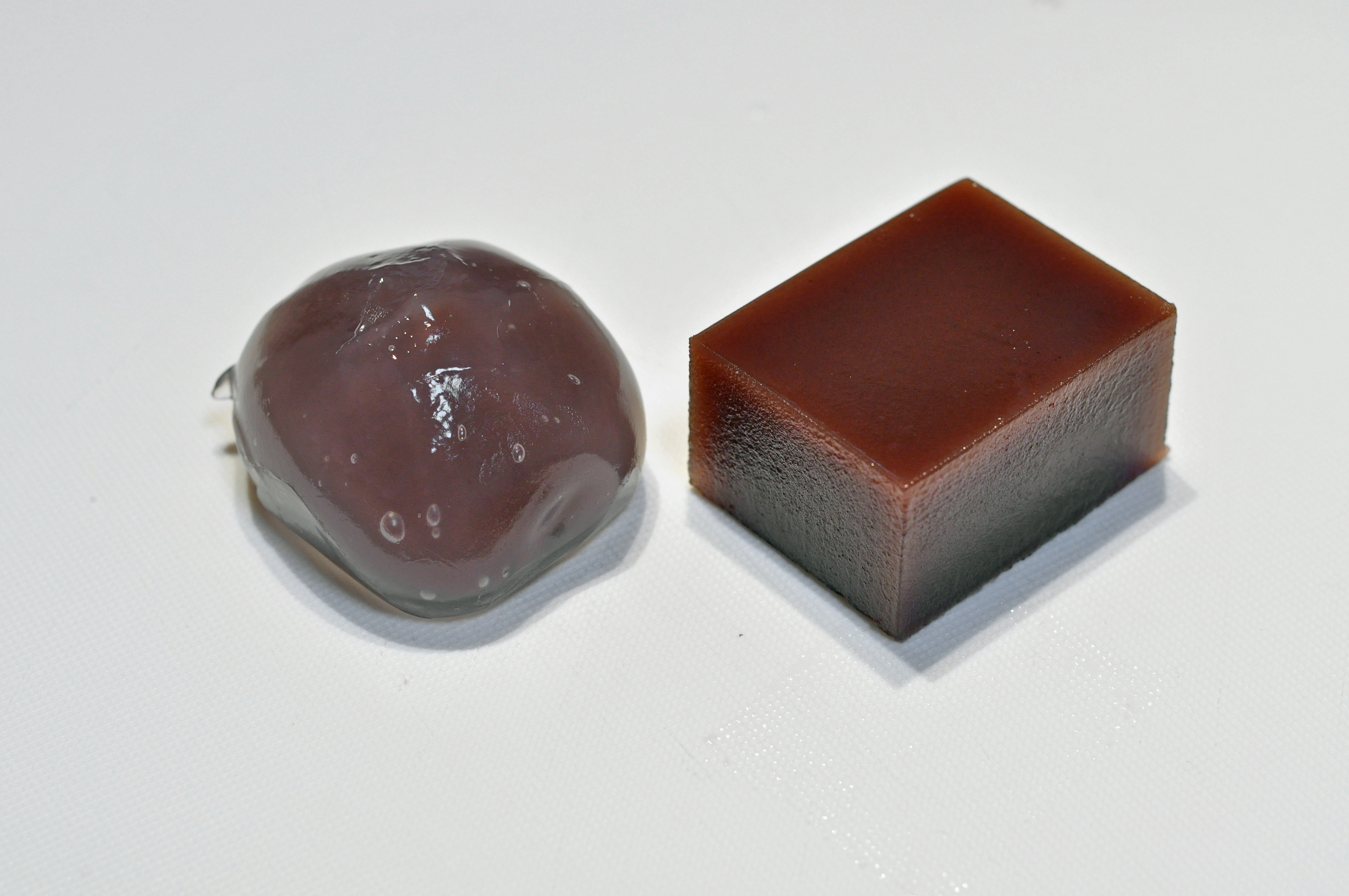
Yōkan and kuzu manjū

During the Kamakura period (1185–1333), Japanese Buddhist monks who studied in the Song dynasty brought the tea culture to Japan, and the custom of eating confections with tea began in Japan. The monks also introduced tenshin (点心, dim sum), a light meal, and the history book Teikin ōrai (庭訓往来) mentions udon (饂飩), manjū (饅頭), and yōkan (羊羹) as tenshin (点心). However, the manjū and yōkan brought to Japan by the monks were not sweets as we know them today, but were prepared in a completely different way.

Yōkan comes from the Chinese word yang geng (羊羹 "sheep geng"), which is a type of mutton soup. But since there was no custom of eating animal meat in Japan, the Japanese replaced the meat with a paste made of kneaded barley or azuki bean flour. Later, the soup was removed and replaced with a pasty confection made of barley or azuki bean flour. Finally, around 1800, during the Edo period (1603–1868), 500 years later, yōkan became what it is today.

The invention of kanten (寒天, agar) in the 1600s was essential to the birth of modern yokan. Later, the kanten invented in Japan was introduced to Manchuria, Korea and Taiwan.

Yōkan is used as an ingredient in other foods, such as "Siberia", a type of castella cake.

== Gallery ==
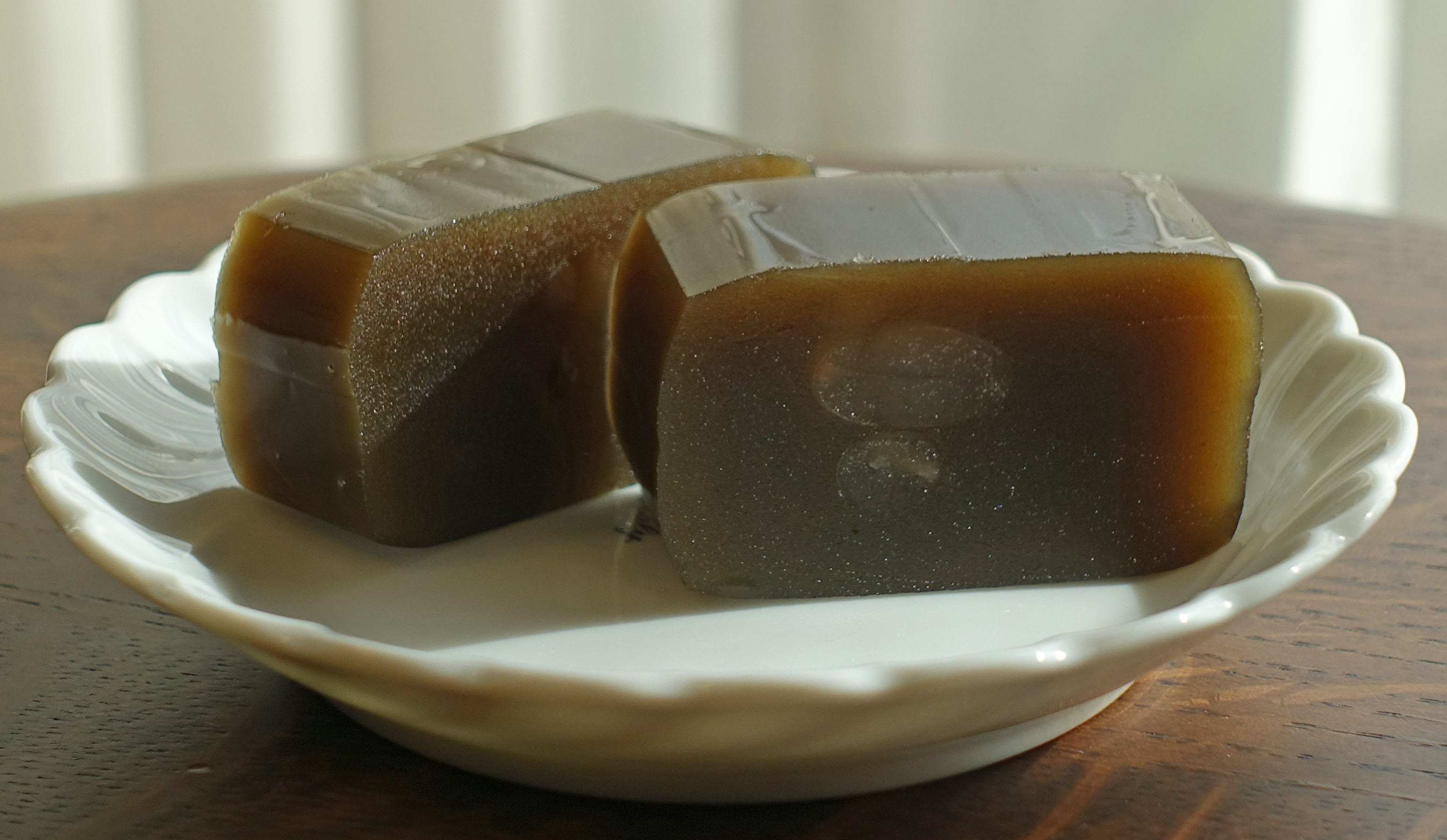

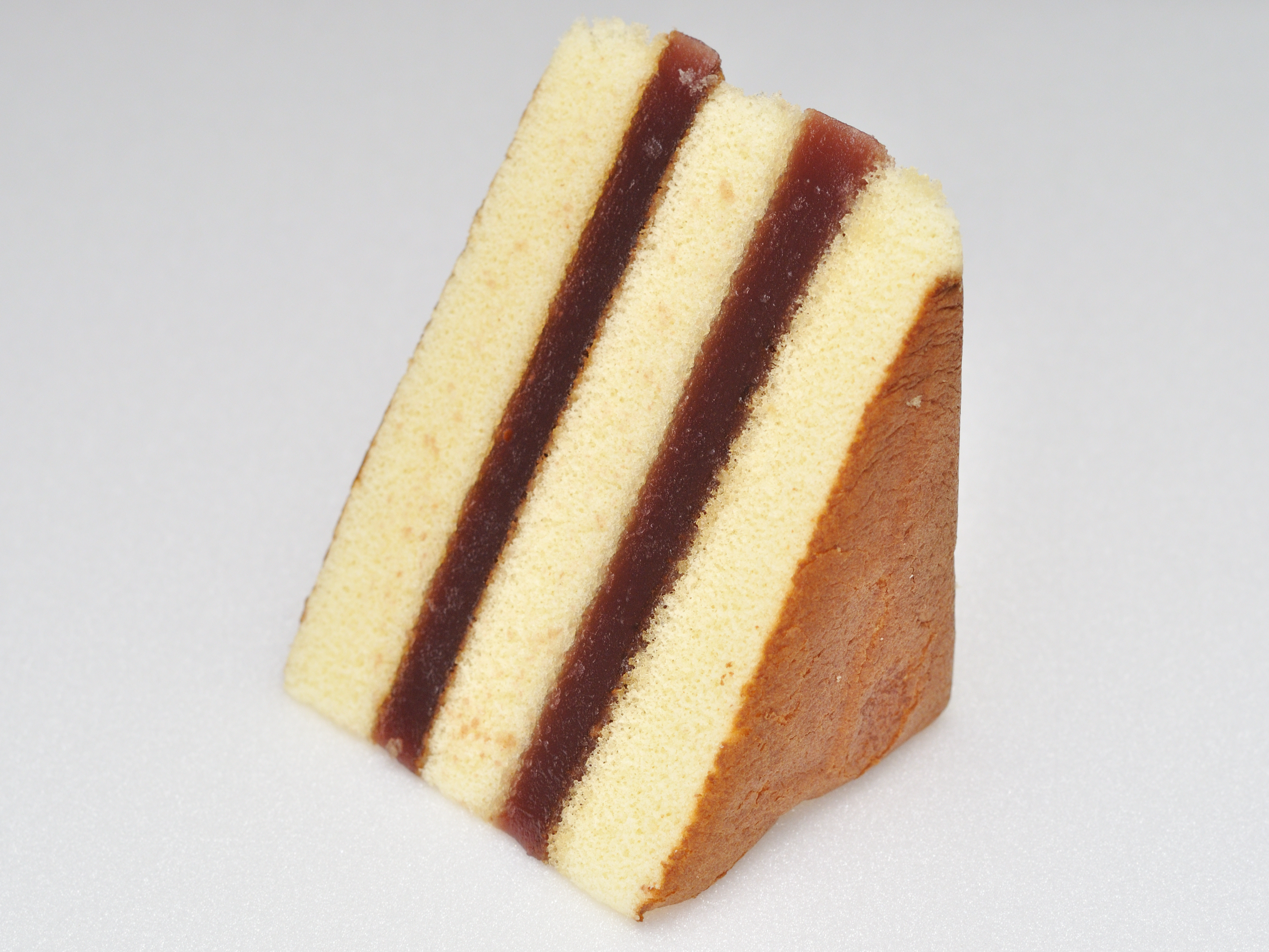
"Siberia", a type of castella cake with yōkan

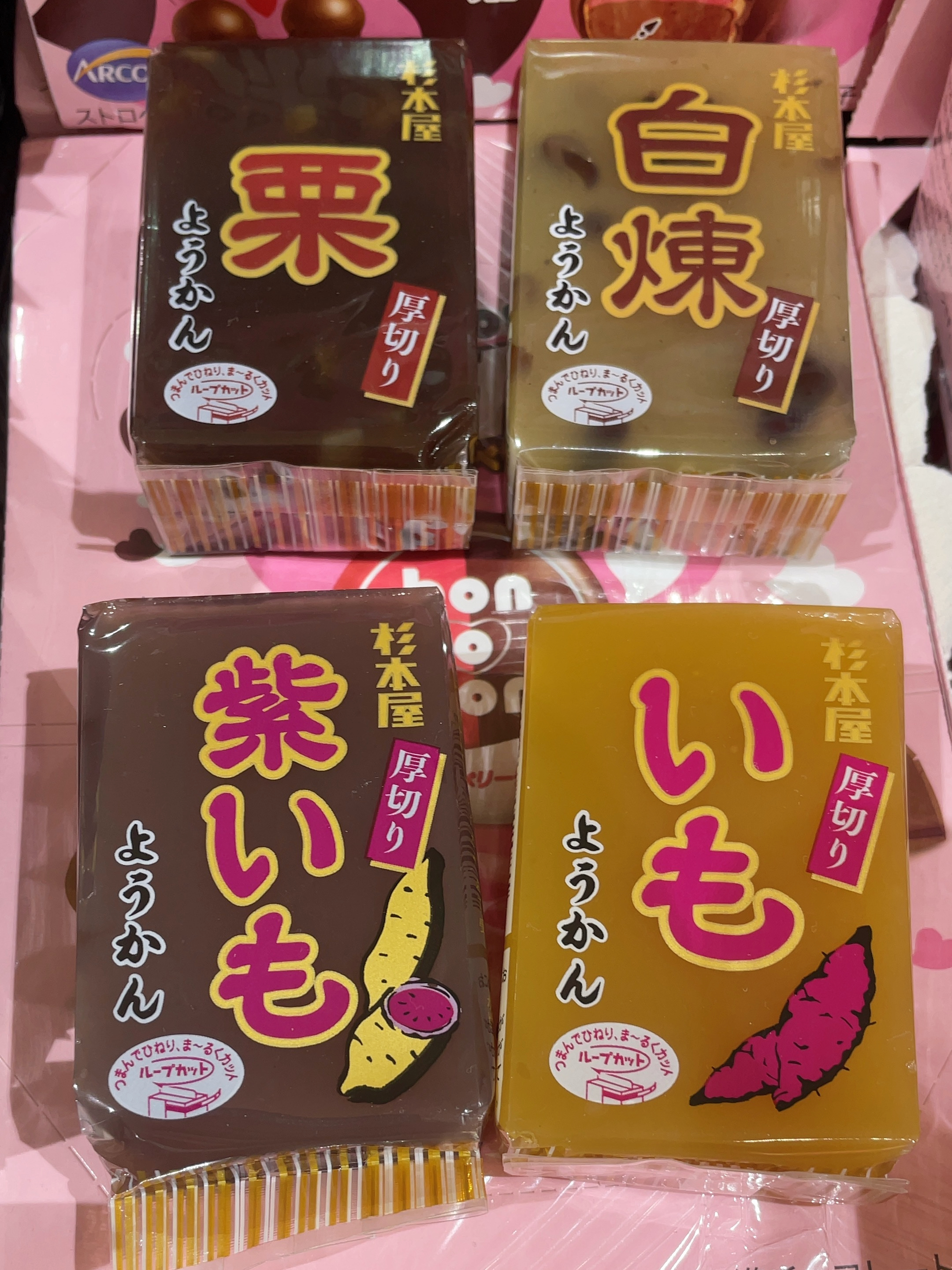
Chestnut and sweet potato yōkan

== See also ==
- Gelatin dessert
- Uirō
- Karukan
