= Severin Sterm =

Danish topographical writer

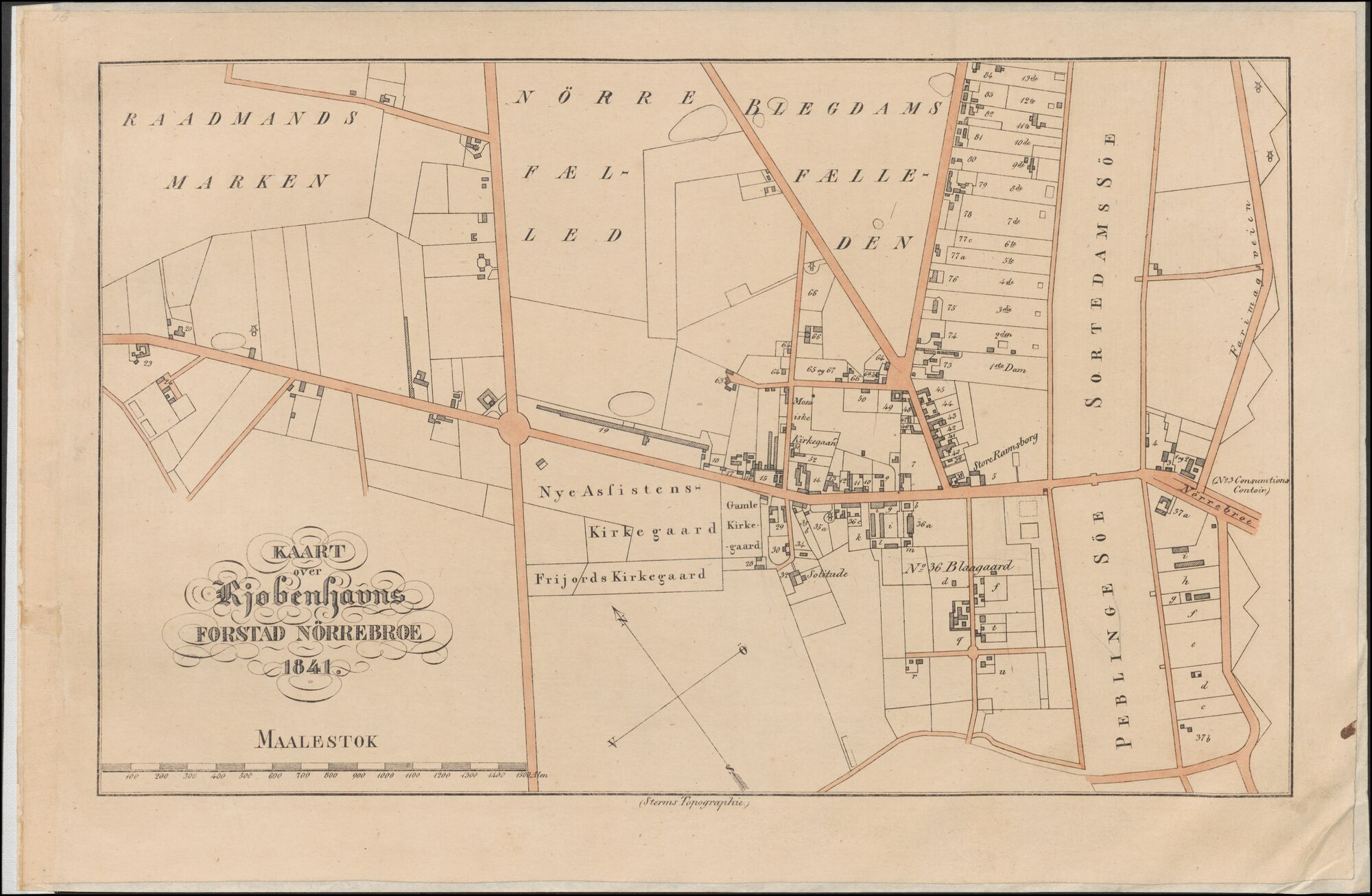
Map of Nørrebro by Severin Sterm.

Nicolai Severin Sterm (1784 - 24 November 1853) was a Danish topographical writer.

== Biography ==
Sterm was born in 1784 to Peter Severin Sterm (ca. 1732–1800) and Anne Marie Bjørn (ca. 1753– 1816). His father owned Vejen Watermill. He later bought Hanne-vanggård at Vejle.

== Written works ==
Sterm worked on a comprehensive topographical work about Denmark and Slesvig-Holsten-Lauenburg. The first volume was published in 1831 as Topographie over Frederiksborg Amt. It was later followed by Statistisk-topographisk Beskrivelse over Kjøbenhavns Amt, Vol. I–III (1834–38). It was published with economic support from the politician Carl Simony. His next publication was Statistisk-topographisk Beskrivelse over Hoved- og Residentsstaden Kjøbenhavn, Vol 1O-OOO (1839–41). Other publications include a series of maps of the districts of Copenhagen from 1830–1841.
