= Séverine (given name) =

Séverine is a feminine given name.

== People with the name ==
Notable people with the name include:

- Séverine Amiot (born 1979), French paracanoer
- Séverine Autesserre (born 1976), French-American author and researcher
- Séverine Beltrame (born 1979), French tennis player
- Séverine Bonal (born 1972), French archer
- Séverine Caneele (born 1974), Belgian film actress
- Séverine Cornamusaz (born 1975), Swiss-French film director
- Séverine Deneulin (born 1974), Belgian author and researcher
- Séverine Desbouys (born 1974), French road cyclist
- Séverine Eraud (born 1995), French racing cyclist
- Séverine Ferrer (born 1977), French singer
- Séverine Foulon (1973-2024), French middle distance runner
- Séverine Gipson (born 1970), French politician
- Séverine Keimig (born 1993), German fashion model, health coach, and businesswoman
- Séverine Lecouflé (born 1975), French footballer
- Séverine Loyau (born 1973), French sprint canoer
- Séverine Nébié (born 1982), Burkinabé judoka
- Séverine Pont-Combe (born 1979), Swiss ski mountaineer and long-distance runner
- Séverine Sigrist (born 1973), French neuroscientist
- Séverine Vandenhende (born 1974), French judoka
- Séverine Werbrouck (born 1970), French politician

== People with the nickname or pen name ==
- Caroline Rémy de Guebhard (1855–1929), pen name Séverine, French socialist, journalist, and feminist
- Séverine (singer) (Josiane Grizeau, born 1948), French singer

== Fictional characters ==
- Sévérine, a fictional character in the 2012 James Bond film Skyfall
- Séverine Serizy, played by Catherine Deneuve, in Luis Buñuel's 1967 Belle de Jour
- Séverine Roubaud, in La Bête Humaine, a 1938 French film
