= Severino =

- Gender: Male/Female

Origin
- Origin: Italian, Spanish, Portuguese, American

Severino is an Italian, Spanish, and Portuguese given name and sometimes surname:

- Saint Severinus of Noricum (c.410–482), Roman Catholic saint:
- Severin of Cologne, Roman Catholic saint
- Emanuele Severino (1929–2020), Italian philosopher
- Igor Severino (born 2003), Brazilian MMA fighter
- Isabelle Severino (born 1980), French gymnast
- Lucas Severino (born 1979), Brazilian footballer
- Luis Severino (born 1994), Dominican baseball player
- Paola Severino (born 1948), Italian Justice Minister and University Rector
- Pedro Severino (born 1993), Dominican baseball player
- Robson Severino da Silva (born 1983), Brazilian footballer
- Roger Severino, United States lawyer
- Sander Severino (1985–2026), Filipino chess player
- Sérgio Severino da Silva (born 1978), Brazilian footballer

== Given name ==
- Severino Albarracín (1851–1878), Spanish anarchist
- Severino Antinori (born 1945), Italian gynecologist and embryologist
- Severino Cavalcanti (1930–2020), Brazilian politician
- Severino Compagnoni (1914–2006), Italian cross country skier
- Severino Di Giovanni (1901–1931), Italian anarchist
- Severino Gazzelloni (1919–1992), Italian flutist
- Severino Montano (1915–1980), Filipino playwright, director and actor
- Severino Nardozzi (born 1946), Italian racing driver
- Severino Poletto (born 1933), Italian cardinal
- Severino dos Ramos Durval da Silva (born 1980), Brazilian footballer
- Severino Reija (born 1938), Spanish footballer
- Severino Reyes (1861–1942), Filipino writer, playwright and director
- Severino Santiapichi (1926–2016), Italian magistrate and writer

== See also ==
- San Severino - Various places in Italy
- Severino (album), album by Brazilian band Os Paralamas do Sucesso released in 1994
