= Collegiate Church of Saint-Martin of Candes =

Former collegiate church

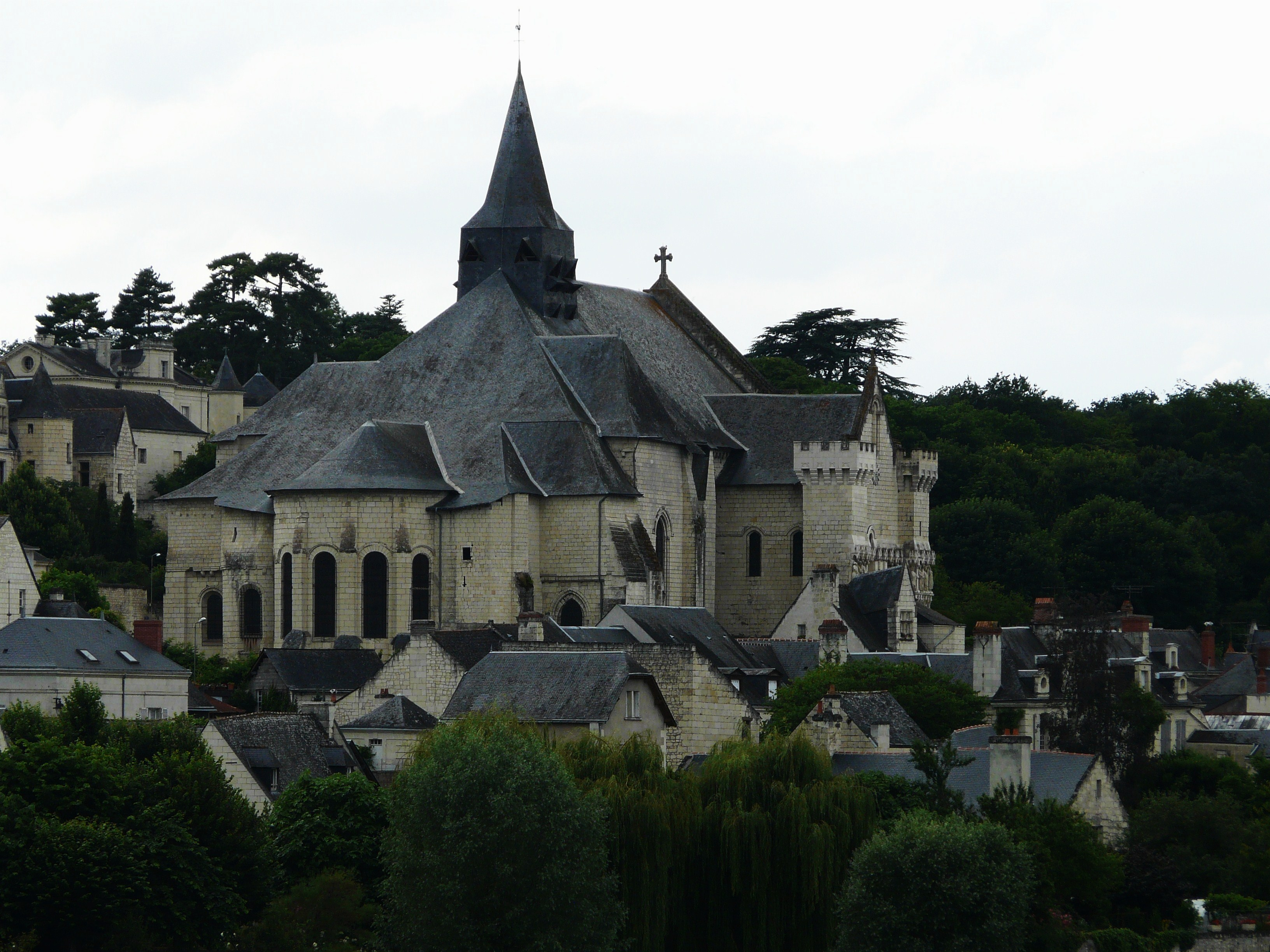
- General view of the collegiate church, from the Vienne upstream.

Religion
- Affiliation: Catholic church
- District: Candes-Saint-Martin
- Region: Centre-Val de Loire

Location
- Country: France
- Interactive map of Collegiate Church of Saint-Martin of Candes
- Territory: Indre-et-Loire
- Coordinates: 47°12′40″N 0°04′26″E

Architecture
- Style: Plantagenet style
- Completed: 1250
- Designated as NHL: Classified MH (1840)

The Collegiate Church of Saint-Martin of Candes is a former collegiate church located in Candes-Saint-Martin, in the western part of the Indre-et-Loire department, within the Centre-Val de Loire region of France.

The site originally featured a church dedicated to Saint Maurice, established by Saint Martin in one of the earliest rural parishes of the Tours region. Saint Martin died there in 397. Although it did not house his relics, the church later became a pilgrimage site. By 1050, it was referred to as a collegiate church, with a chapter consisting of twelve canons.

The current Church of Saint-Martin of Candes was constructed between 1175 and the mid-13th century, replacing the earlier Church of Saint-Maurice, which had fallen into ruin. The relatively brief construction period reflects the significance of the building, which features architectural elements characteristic of the Gothic style of western France. It is noted for its elaborate sculptural decoration on the transept and nave, particularly the monumental north-facing porch. In the 15th century, following the Hundred Years' War, defensive elements were added, making it one of the few fortified churches in the Touraine region. The church sustained considerable damage during the Wars of Religion in 1562 and 1568. Further destruction occurred as a result of two earthquakes in 1711 and 1840, prompting major restoration campaigns. Restoration efforts in the second half of the 19th century were subject to criticism, with some historians referring to them as "vandalism." Despite these events, the Church of Saint-Martin of Candes is regarded as one of the most notable religious buildings in Indre-et-Loire, second only to the Cathedral of Saint-Gatien in Tours. It lost its collegiate status during the French Revolution, although the title is still commonly used. Today, it functions as a parish church.

The Church of Saint-Martin of Candes continues to be the subject of scholarly research in the early 21st century, particularly regarding its construction chronology, architectural features, and complex decorative program. Due to limited written sources and the overlapping nature of its construction phases, interpreting the building's development remains challenging. The church was visited by Prosper Mérimée in 1836 and was included on the 1840 list of historic monuments. Several elements of its interior furnishings, including the high altar and its tabernacle, as well as statues, paintings, and a bell, are also classified as protected heritage objects.

== Location ==
Candes in the 13th century, against a backdrop of modern roads.

Candes-Saint-Martin is located at the junction of the former Roman civitates of the Turones, Andecavi, and Pictones, and is among the earliest rural parishes founded by Bishop Martin of Tours in the late 4th century. Its strategic position likely influenced the decision to establish a church on a site that had been inhabited since the early Roman Empire.

The village is situated on the left bank of the Vienne and Loire rivers, at their confluence, and is accessible via a route running along the Loire. This road, possibly of Roman origin, is referenced on the Peutinger Table. Candes has been proposed as a potential site for Robrica, a Roman station mentioned on the map, although its exact location remains uncertain. The segment of the route from Tours to Candes may have gained renewed importance during the rise of pilgrimages dedicated to Saint Martin, particularly under Bishop Perpetuus of Tours in the late 5th century. Additional access routes included one along the Vienne River and another from Loudun to the north. The village’s layout reflects its topography. Some dwellings are located to the north, between the road and the riverbank, while others are built to the south of the road on a series of natural terraces. The collegiate church is situated on the first of these terraces, elevated several meters above the road. Its orientation, adapted to the terrain, places the choir facing southeast rather than along a strict east-west axis. In the Middle Ages, the church occupied a central position within the area enclosed by the town’s defensive wall.

== History ==
=== Before the collegiate church ===
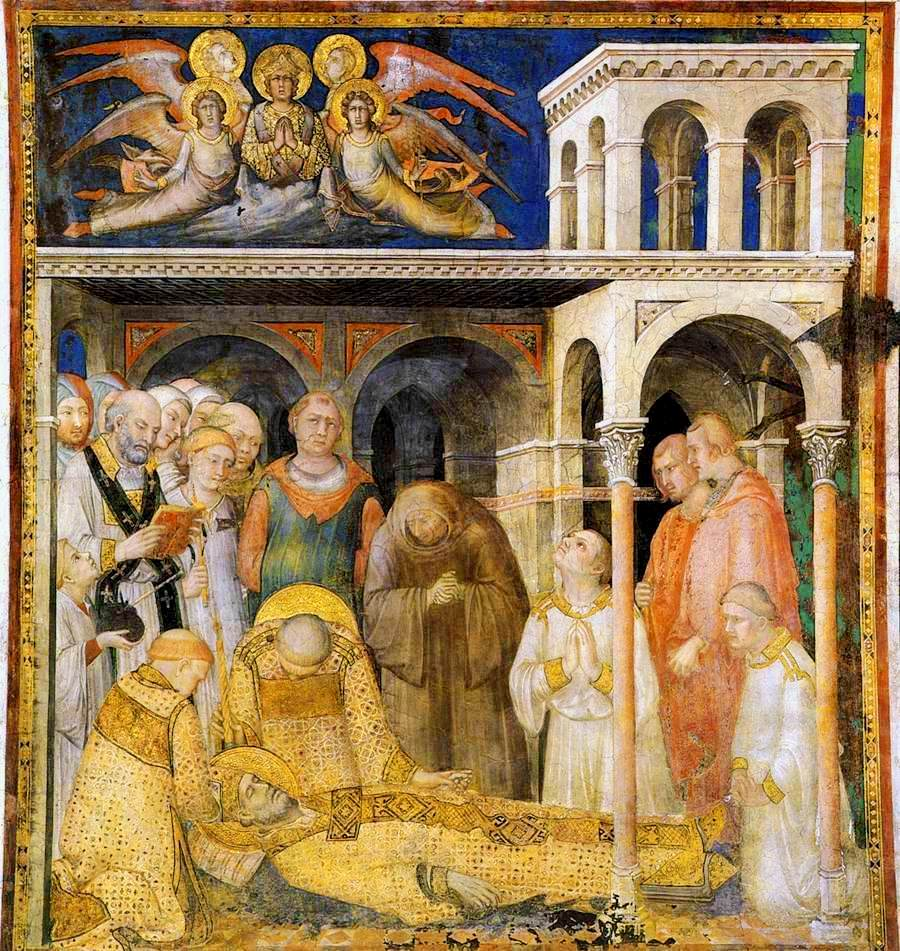
The death of Saint Martin. Fresco in the crypt of the chapel of Saint Martin in Assisi, c. 1325.

Saint Martin died in Candes on November 8, 397, at the age of 81, while visiting the town to mediate a dispute within his diocese. His death house became a pilgrimage site from the 5th century onward and appears to have remained intact until the 12th century. The original church, (Note: The scene depicted on "Bay 20" of the Cathedral of Chartres shows two men from Tours passing Martin’s body through one of the openings of the very first church in Candes.) which he dedicated to Saint Maurice, (Note: In this regard, Philippe Georges notes the following: Let us recall, if need be, that it was at Candes in Anjou that the thirteenth apostle breathed his last. His body was carried off at night by the people of Tours and brought back to Tours. Four slates (1729, 1783, 1852–1856) were discovered, along with a glass vial containing soil 'where Saint Martin died on ashes and a hair shirt,' and soil of Saint Maurice. — Philippe Georges, 2004, p. 1056.) was still standing at that time. Although its exact location is unknown, it is believed to have been situated south of the present-day Collegiate Church of Saint-Martin. Until the mid-9th century, the church was served by monks from a priory founded by Martin. They were later replaced by a chapter of twelve canons, documented around 1050, at which point the Church of Saint-Maurice was elevated to the status of a collegiate church.

The change in status from monastic to collegiate church appears to have been motivated by ecclesiastical regulations that restricted regular clerics from maintaining constant contact with the increasing number of worshippers. By the 12th century, both the original church and the building traditionally identified as Saint Martin’s death house had fallen into disrepair. These structures were either demolished or abandoned around 1175. (Note: Mussat 1963, p. 380) The construction of a new collegiate church dedicated to Saint Martin became necessary and was already in progress when the monk Guibert-Martin of Gembloux visited Candes on April 25, 1181, as he reported in a letter to Archbishop Philip of Heinsberg of Cologne.

In addition to practical or canonical considerations, the construction of the new church may have been influenced by ecclesiastical power dynamics. Archbishop Barthélemy de Vendôme, who assumed office in 1174, noted that the principal Martinian sites in Tours had gradually come under the authority of the Chapter of Saint-Martin (for the sepulchral basilica) and the Abbey of Marmoutier. By commissioning a monumental church at Candes—another significant site associated with Saint Martin—Barthélemy may have sought to reinforce his authority within the diocese.

=== Construction: 12th and 13th centuries ===
Until the mid-20th century, it was commonly believed that the Collegiate Church of Saint-Martin of Candes had been constructed in two distinct phases: first the choir and transept, followed by the nave and its porch. This hypothesis has since been reconsidered, as the building's construction chronology appears to be more complex. Modifications were made to completed sections while other parts were still under construction. Despite this complexity, the overall construction was completed within a few decades, a relatively short period given the scale of the project.

==== Choir and transept ====
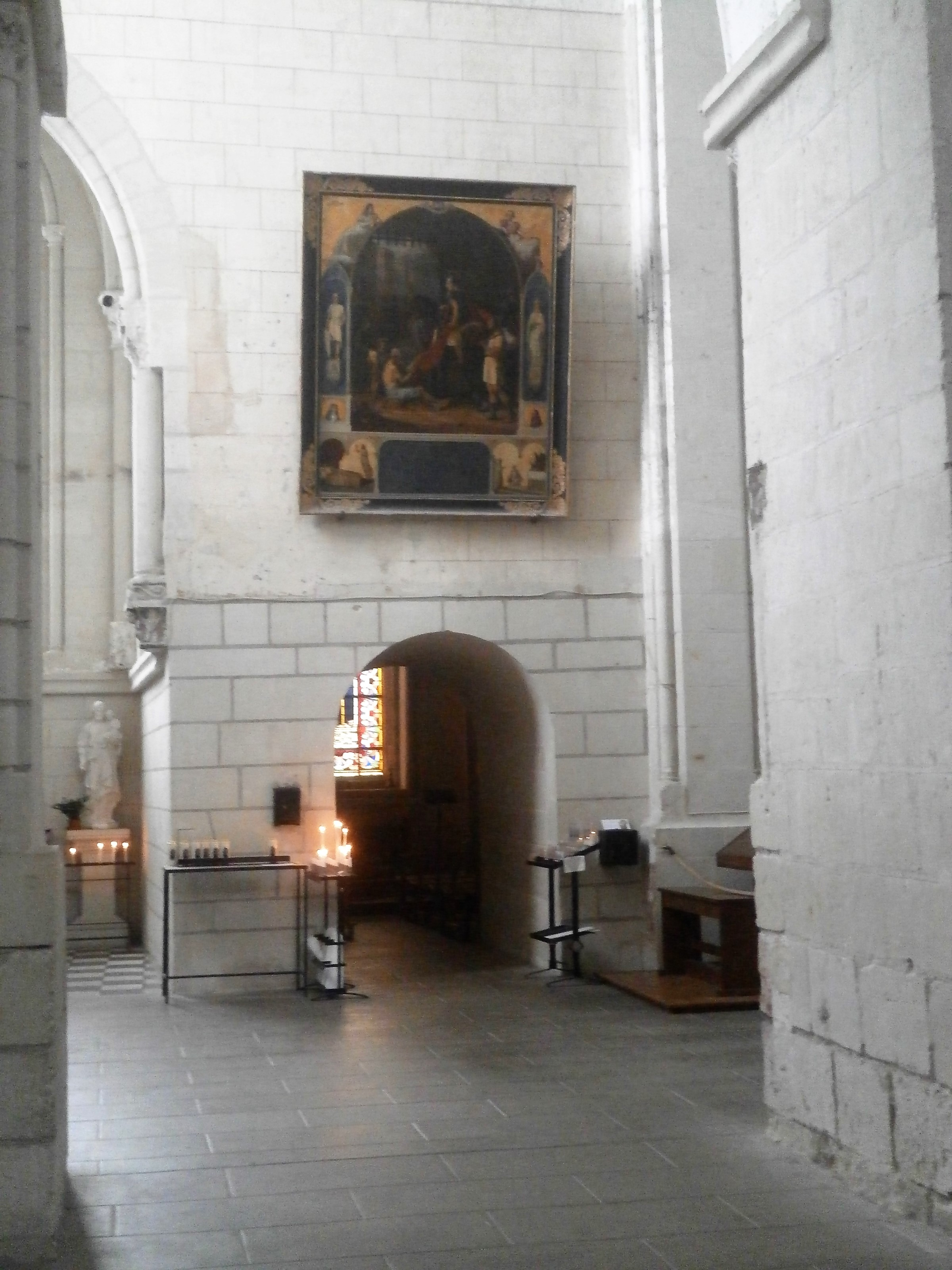
Entrance to the Saint-Martin chapel.

Construction of the Collegiate Church of Saint-Martin of Candes began with the choir. The first structure built was likely the northern apse chapel, known as the Saint-Martin Chapel, which is traditionally believed to have stood on the site of Saint Martin’s death house. (Note: A persistent tradition claims that this chapel still has the window through which the monks from Tours, during the night following Martin’s death, removed his body “under the noses and beards” of their counterparts from Poitou to bring it back to Tours.) This chapel may have reused elements of an earlier building—possibly a church—though its exact date, nature, and function remain uncertain. The access corridor to the chapel cuts through a massive structure thought to be the base of a bell tower, although this interpretation is debated. The presence of both a basement and an upper level within this structure adds to the uncertainty regarding its original purpose.

Construction proceeded with the main apse and the southern apse of the choir, followed by the southern chapel, which later served as the sacristy. These sections were likely built in the last quarter of the 12th century. The choir's sculptural decoration, which reflects the Gothic style of western France, supports this dating. The next phases included the northern chapel, or Chapel of the Virgin, located adjacent to the Saint-Martin Chapel, and the transept, completed in the first quarter of the 13th century. However, numerous alterations, particularly to the apsidioles of the choir, occurred over time, including into the 18th century, complicating efforts to reconstruct the building’s chronological development. (Note: Mussat 1964, p. 502) One example is the elevation of the transept to align with the higher vaults of the nave.

Liturgical services likely began in the collegiate church as soon as the choir and transept were completed, before the nave was finished. This suggests a degree of urgency, possibly due to the deteriorated condition of the earlier Church of Saint-Maurice, which the new building was intended to replace.

==== Nave ====
Proposition de plan initial de la collégiale.

Following the completion of the choir and transept, the construction of the Collegiate Church of Saint-Martin of Candes underwent a significant alteration under a new architect, who implemented a revised design. The original plan had envisioned a nave of the same height as the transept, which was ultimately modified to accommodate a taller nave. This change required adjustments to the existing transept structure. The width of the nave was also altered; the original plan featured narrower side aisles in comparison to the central vessel, a design modification that resulted in visible irregularities at the junction between the nave and the transept, including a skewed south wall and realignment of the pillars on the north side. (Note: Mussat 1964, pp. 502 & 503) In a 1988 study on the porch ornamentation, E.-R. Gish proposed a reconstruction of the church’s initial plan. According to his hypothesis, the design may have included a nave with simple, narrow side aisles (with an undefined number of bays), a transept, and a choir consisting of a single bay flanked by two chapels. Each section of the choir would have terminated in an apse oriented to the southeast. The combined width of the choir and its chapels would have corresponded to that of the nave and its aisles. This reconstruction remains hypothetical, as it is based solely on architectural analysis and no original plans of the church have been preserved.

The architecture of the nave of the Collegiate Church of Saint-Martin of Candes, as ultimately constructed, appears to have been strongly influenced by the Cathedral of Saint-Pierre in Poitiers, particularly its three-vessel nave of equal width. The moldings show similarities to those of the choir in the Cathedral of Saint-Julien in Le Mans. (Note: Mussat 1963, p. 381) Comparisons with these two reference buildings—whose construction chronologies are well established—suggest that the nave at Candes was likely built during the second quarter of the 13th century. (Note: Mussat 1963, p. 383)

==== North porch ====
Although not definitively confirmed, the Collegiate Church of Saint-Martin of Candes likely served as a pilgrimage site, as suggested by the presence of the north porch, which provides direct access to a road following the ancient route along the Vienne and Loire rivers. (Note: Mussat 1964, p. 505) The stylistic consistency between the nave and the north porch indicates that the porch was constructed as a continuation of the nave, probably under the same architect but with different construction teams, shortly before 1250. The porch does not appear to have been included in the nave’s original design, as the nave was not built in a continuous sequence from the transept to the façade. Construction began with the first two bays of the nave extending from the transept. Work was then interrupted to construct the porch, which was integrated into the existing masonry. Evidence of this includes the partial obstruction of a window opening in the second bay of the nave and a masonry crack on the south side marking the boundary between the two phases of construction. Following the completion of the porch, the nave was extended westward to the façade. The porch’s sculptural decoration was added several years later but remains incomplete, likely due to financial constraints. (Note: Mussat 1963, p. 386) (Note: Gourdin 1997, p. 115)

North porch.

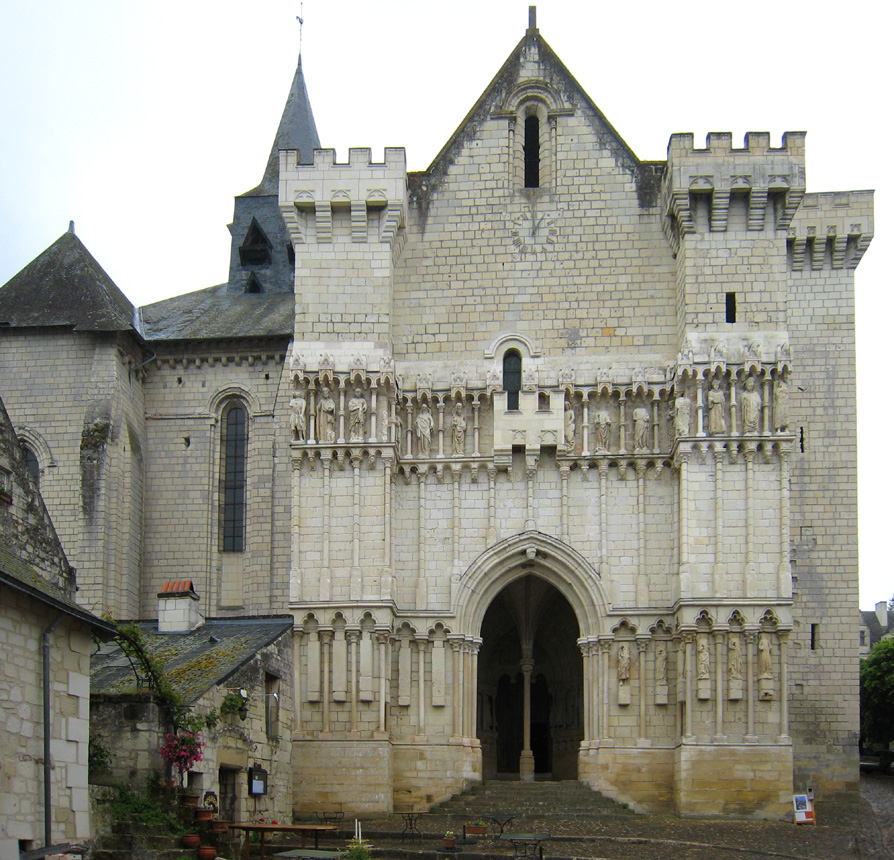
General view of the north porch.

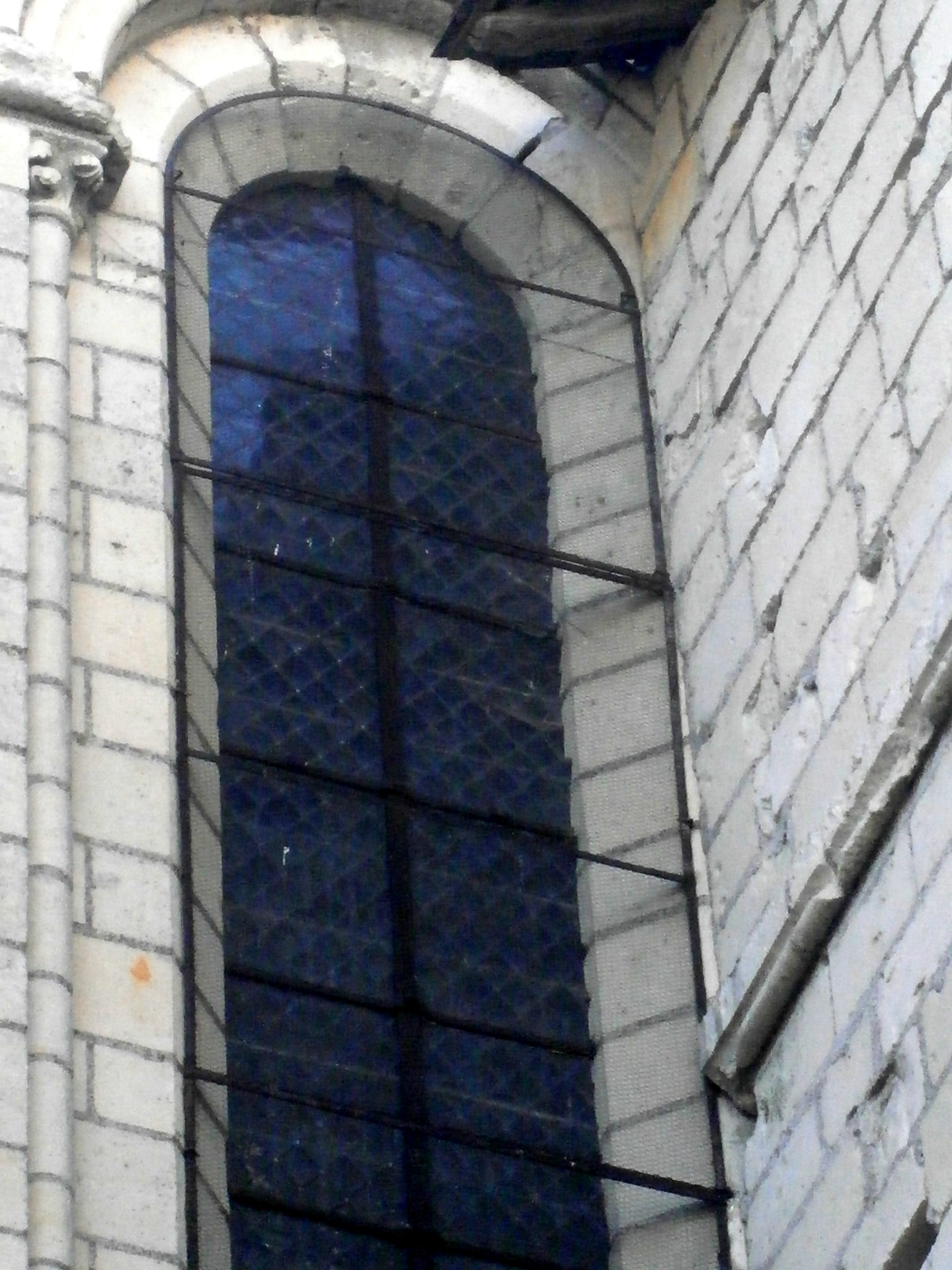
Junction of nave and porch. (Note: The east side wall of the porch is affixed to the north wall of the nave and partially covers the frame of the bay in the second bay of the nave.)

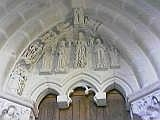
Unfinished decoration on the tympanum of the inner door.

=== Fortification: 15th century ===
The Collegiate Church of Saint-Martin of Candes was partially fortified in the 15th century, likely in response to the insecurity associated with the Hundred Years’ War. During the first half of the century, the fluctuating frontier between French- and English-controlled territories passed near Candes, suggesting that the fortifications date from this period. Modifications included the reconstruction of the upper sections of the two towers flanking the west façade and two additional towers at the corners of the north porch. (Note: Gourdin 1997, p. 117) These were equipped with machicolations and crenellations and connected by a walkway along the roof slopes. A bretèche was added above the north porch façade, and watch chambers were constructed atop the apsidioles, which were raised for this purpose. (Note: Mussat 1964, p. 500) Several windows were also partially sealed. These features indicate that the church may have been designed to serve as a place of refuge for the local population in the event of an attack, making it one of the few fortified churches in the Touraine region, along with the Church of Notre-Dame de La Roche-Posay. (Note: Located in the Vienne department, the town of La Roche-Posay was, before the Revolution, a parish attached to the province of Touraine.)

Fortification systems.

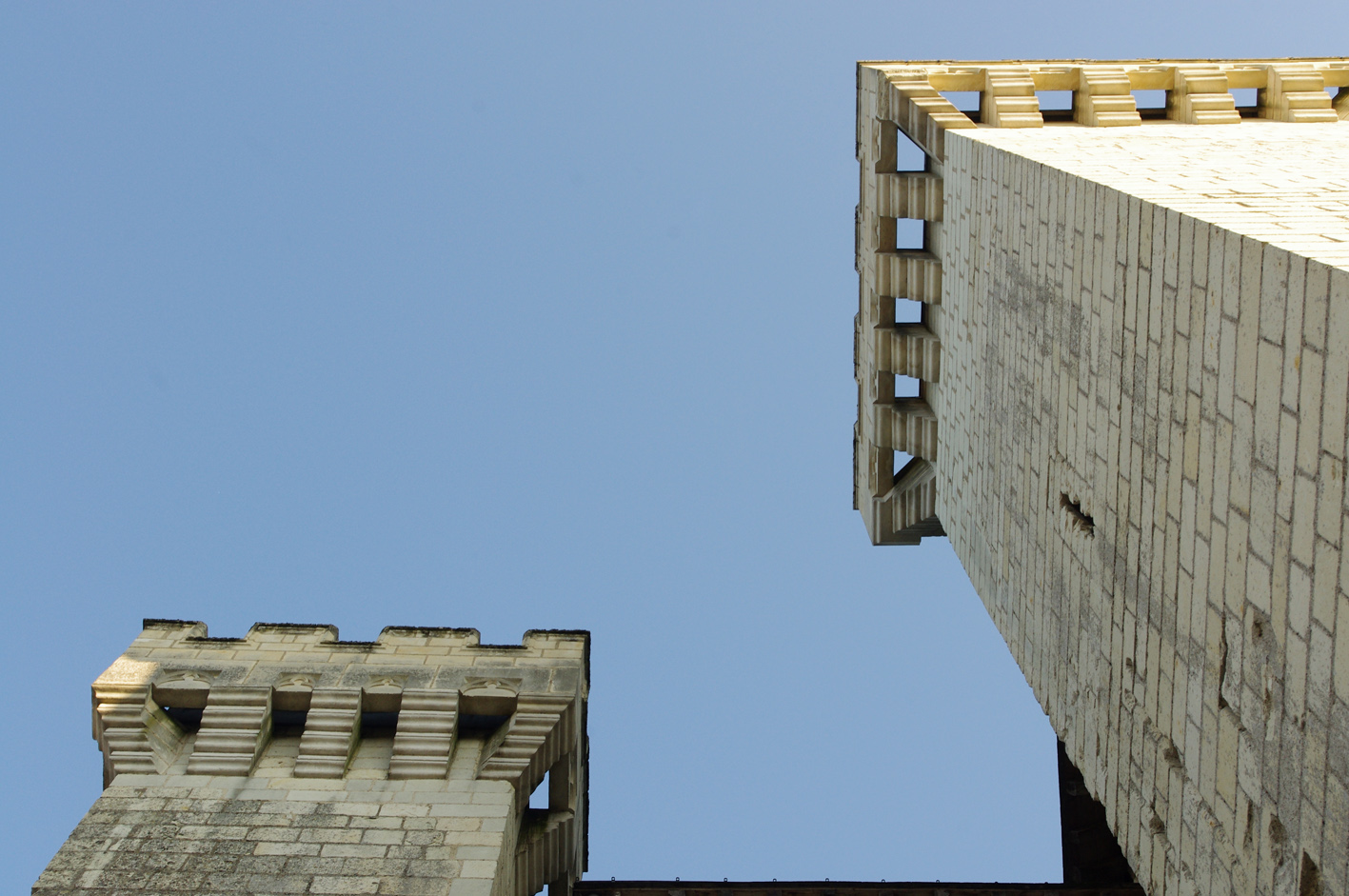
Fortified towers.

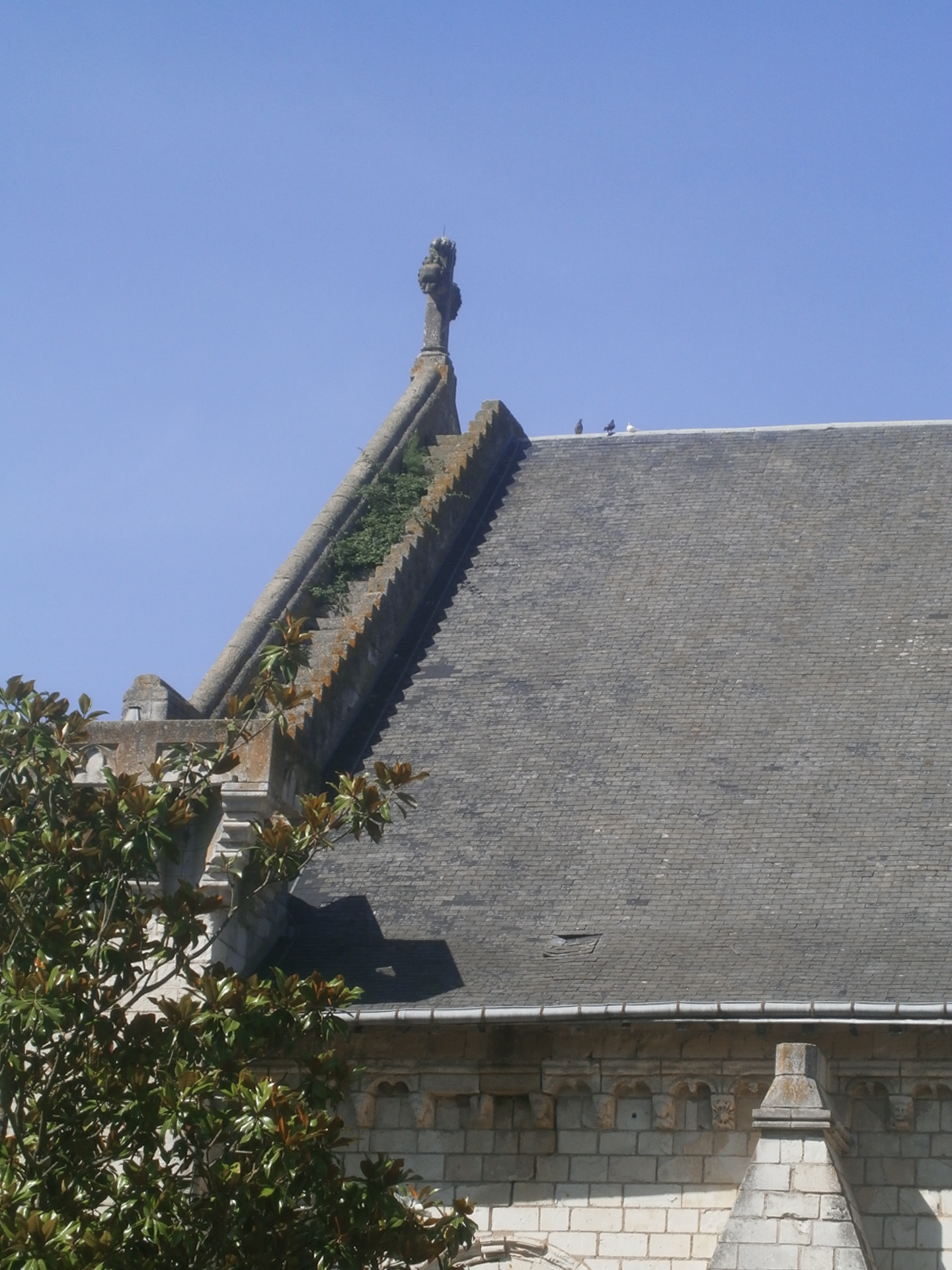
Exterior roof stairs.

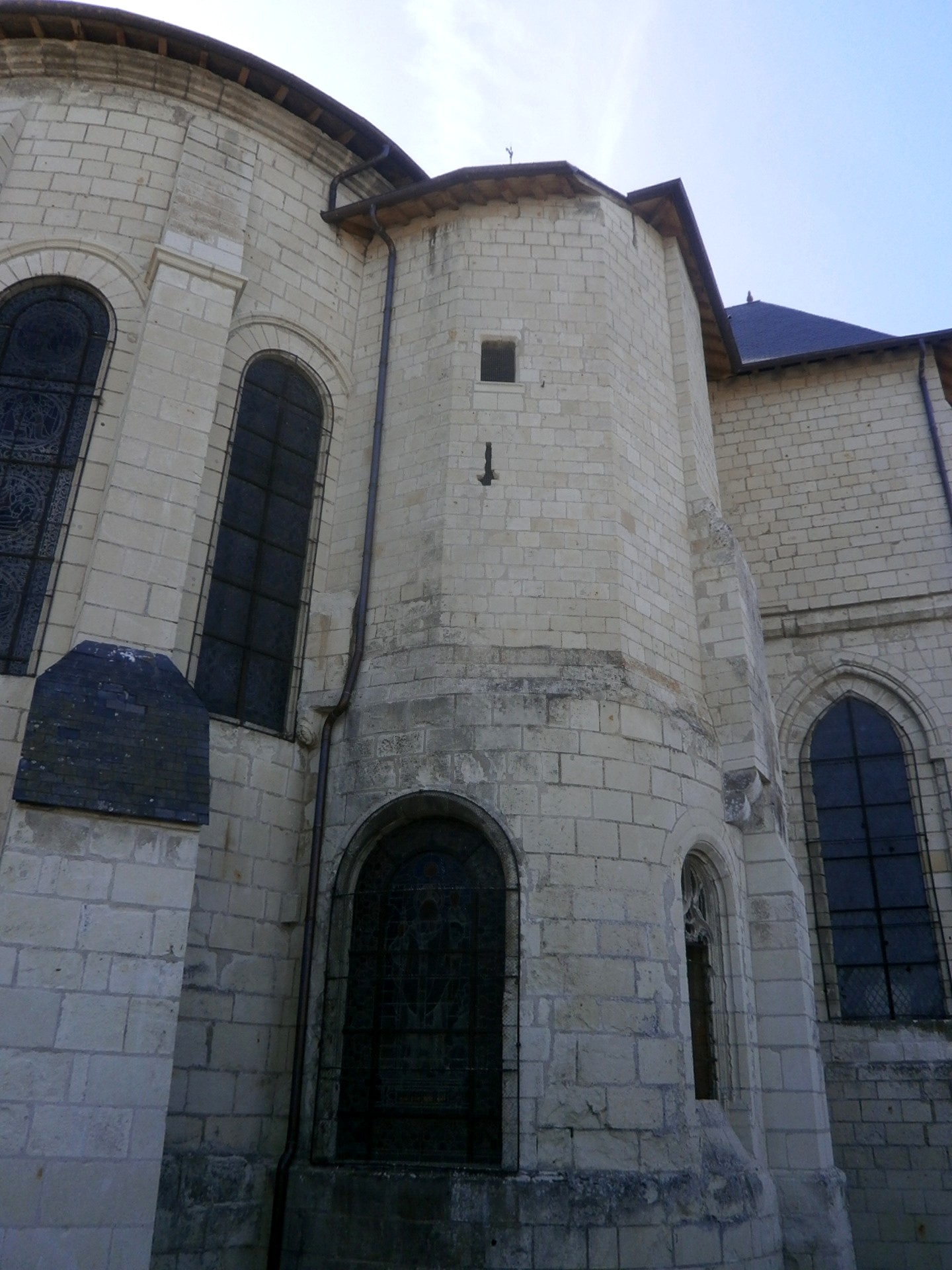
Watch room.

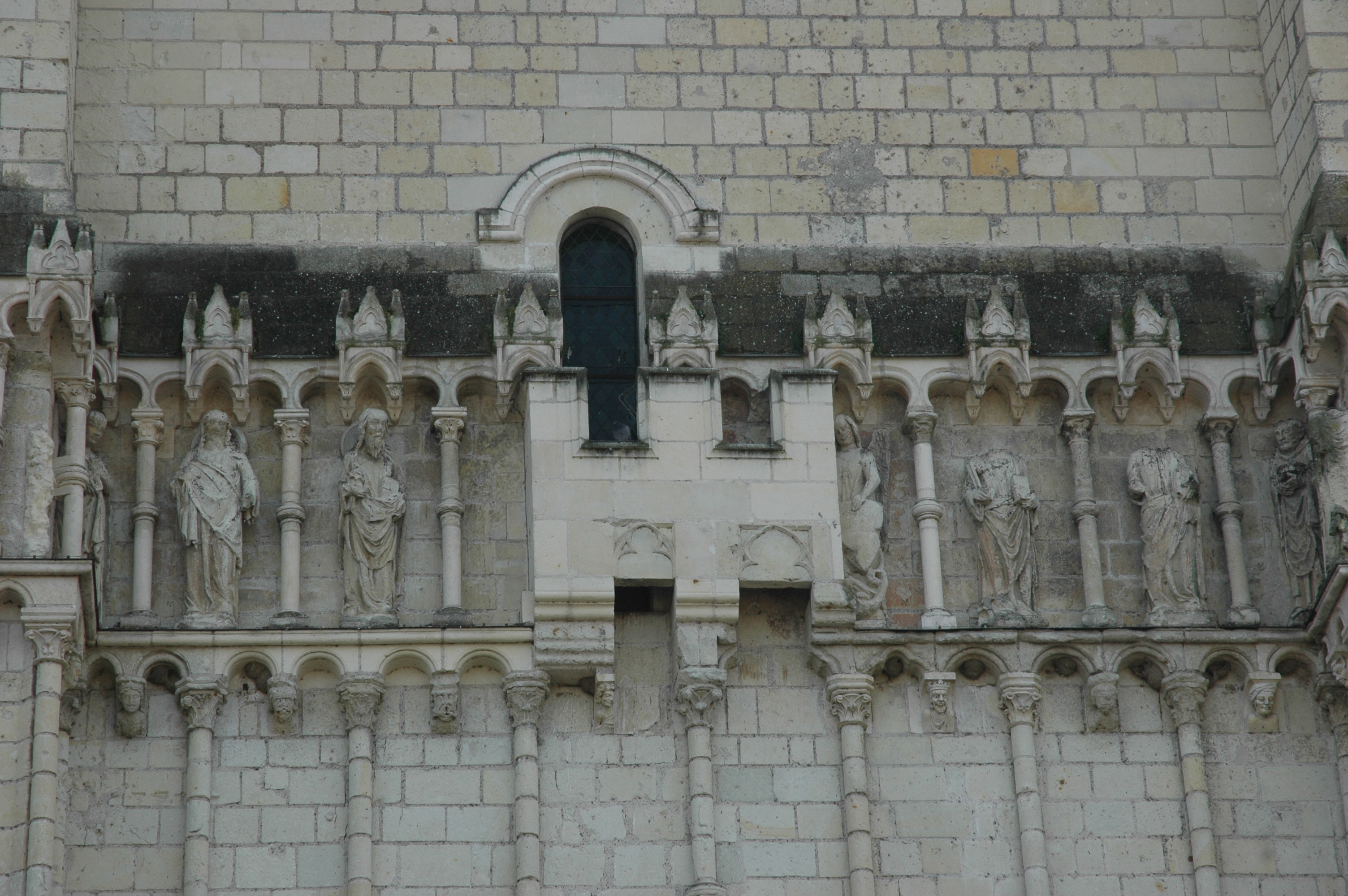
Bretèche.

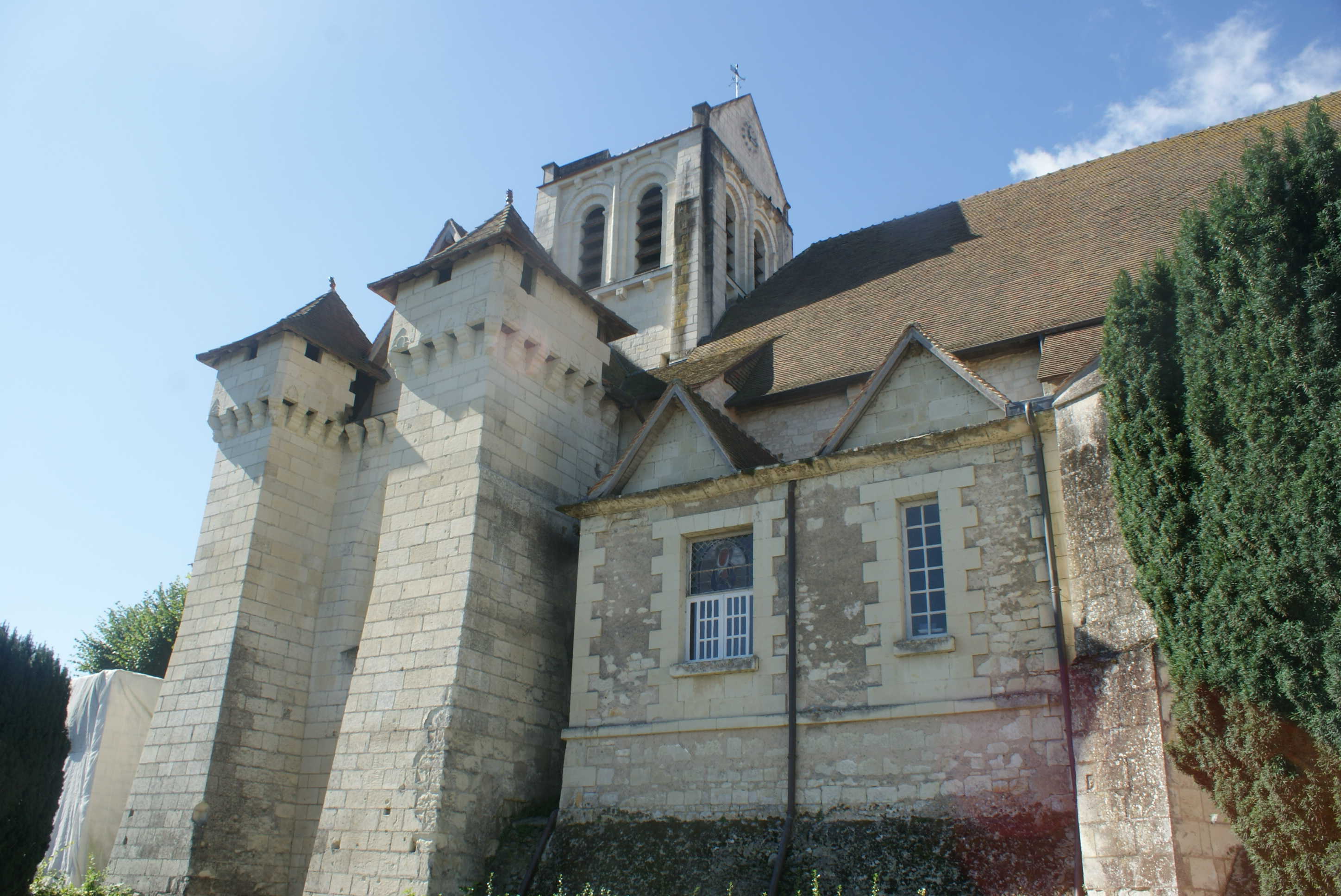
Church of Notre-Dame de la Roche-Posay.

In the 15th century, Archbishop Jean Bernard of Tours (1441–1466) commissioned the painter Jean Fouquet to create an altarpiece for the Collegiate Church of Saint-Martin of Candes. However, it remains uncertain whether the altarpiece was ever completed or delivered, as no documentation confirms its outcome.

Despite the church's fortified structure, it sustained significant damage during the Wars of Religion. In 1562, troops under Gabriel I de Montgomery destroyed various objects, including a wax bust of Louis XI—originally donated by the king—and defaced sculptures on the north porch. They also set fire to the church archives. The loss of these documents has contributed to the limited understanding of the medieval history of both the church and the town, with only two written sources predating the 19th century still extant. The church was again plundered in 1568, and the extent of the damage during this later episode was likely greater than that of 1562. (Note: Lesoing 2016, p. 102)

=== Later modifications ===
==== 18th century ====
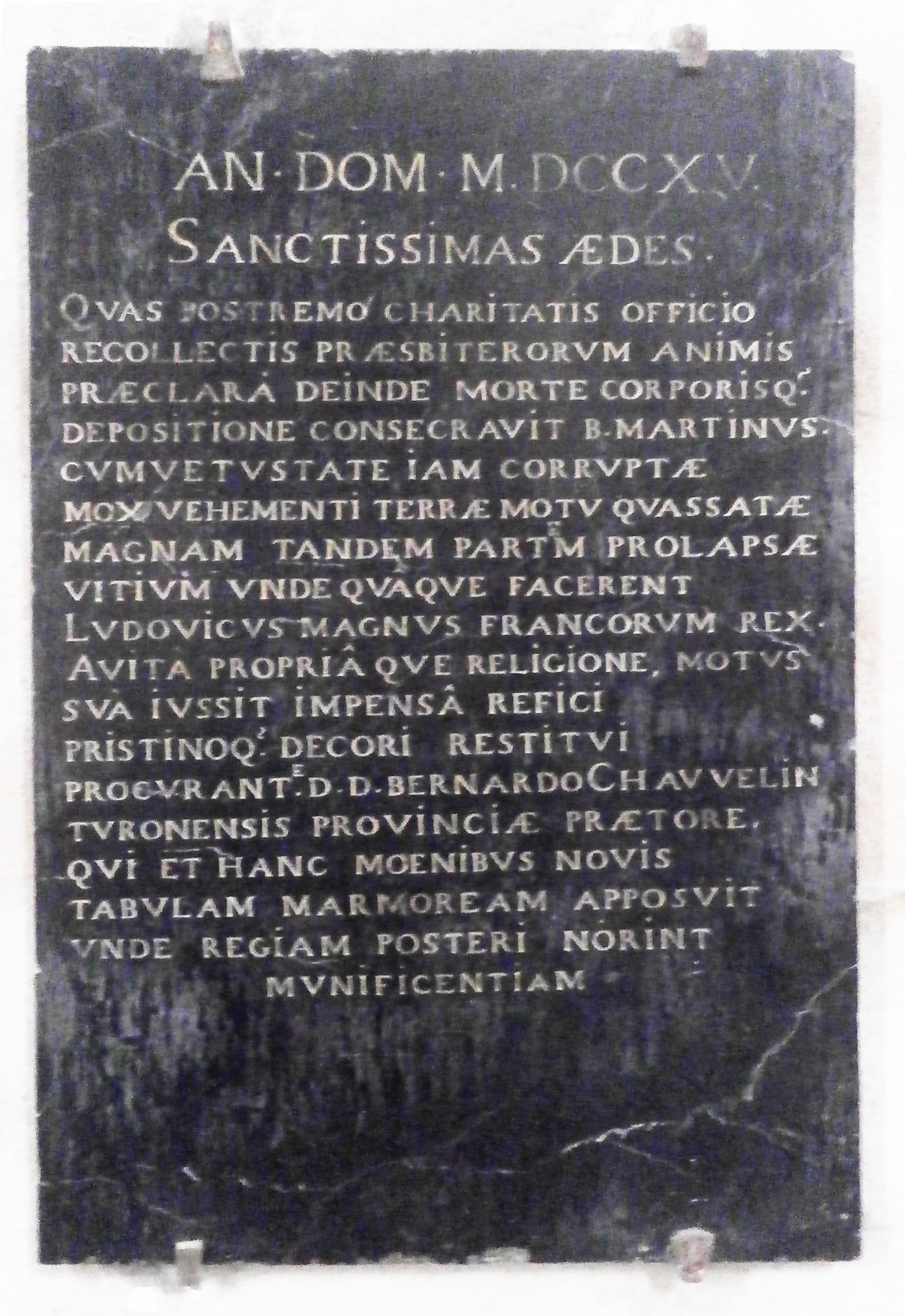
Plaque from 1715.

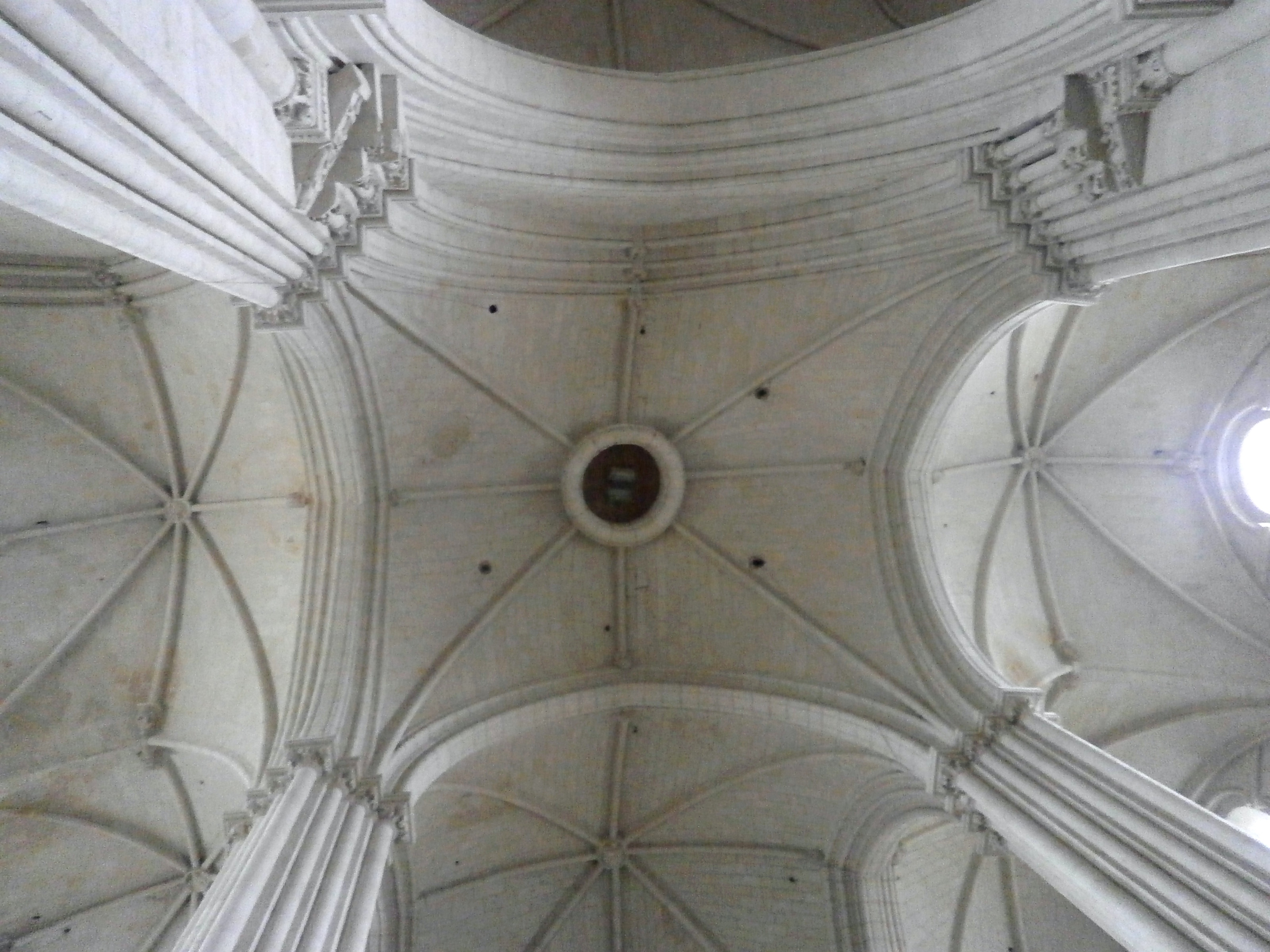
Transept keystone.

On October 6, 1711, an earthquake caused significant damage (Note: This earthquake, whose epicenter was in the Loudun region, remains—at an intensity level of VII–VIII—the most powerful recorded in Poitou.) to the Collegiate Church of Saint-Martin of Candes. This damage may have been exacerbated by a severe storm (Note: The financing of the stained-glass windows near the choir, which were then broken, was undertaken by the Countess of Nancré.) that affected parts of France on December 10 of the same year. (Note: This large-scale storm caused deaths by shipwreck along the Atlantic coast, toppled the spire of the Church of Saint-Laon in Thouars, knocked down buildings in Touraine, and destroyed the rose window of the former Church of Saint-Nicaise in Reims.) King Louis XIV contributed to the repair efforts, a gesture commemorated by a slate plaque set into the interior wall of the nave. (Note: A misreading of this plaque by Prosper Mérimée, who changed 1715 to 1215, was for a long time a source of confusion regarding the chronology of the construction of the collegiate church.) According to a document preserved in the departmental archives of Maine-et-Loire, the vaults of the choir and the southern crossing of the transept collapsed in June 1723, bringing down the bell tower. This bell tower, possibly constructed of stone, may not have stood at the transept crossing but rather above the southern arm, as suggested by the presence of a spiral staircase in that area. The resulting repair work extended at least until 1727, when a fatal accident occurred during the restoration. During this period, the church remained unusable for services. These events and the associated reconstruction significantly altered the architecture and decoration of the central and southern parts of the transept, as well as a pillar in the nave and its supporting vaults. The bell tower was then rebuilt at the crossing of the transept, and an oculus was installed in the vault below to accommodate the bell ropes. Following the dispersal of the last canons during the French Revolution in 1791, the church was reopened for worship in 1802.

==== 19th century ====
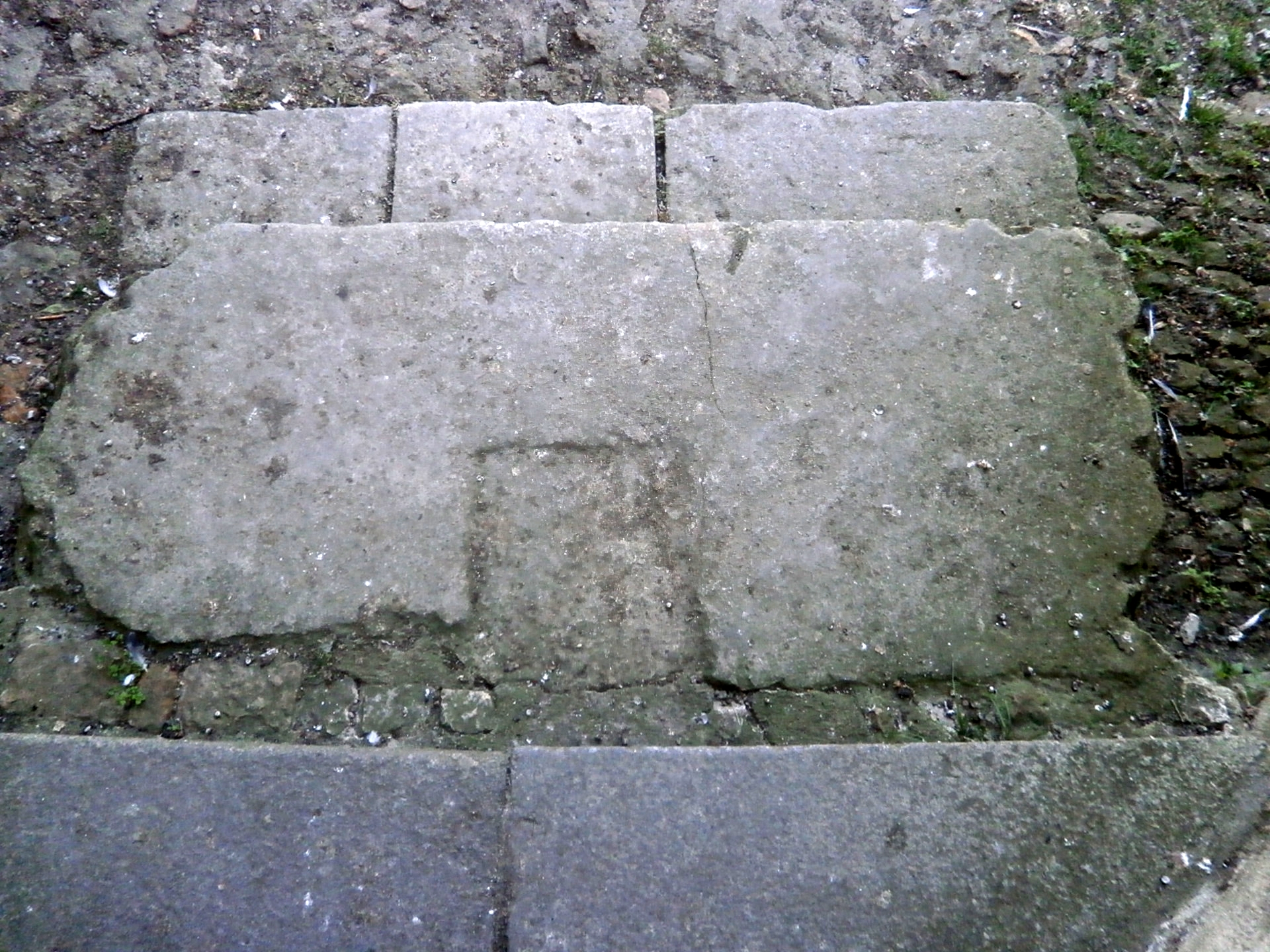
Old altar replaced (porch side step).

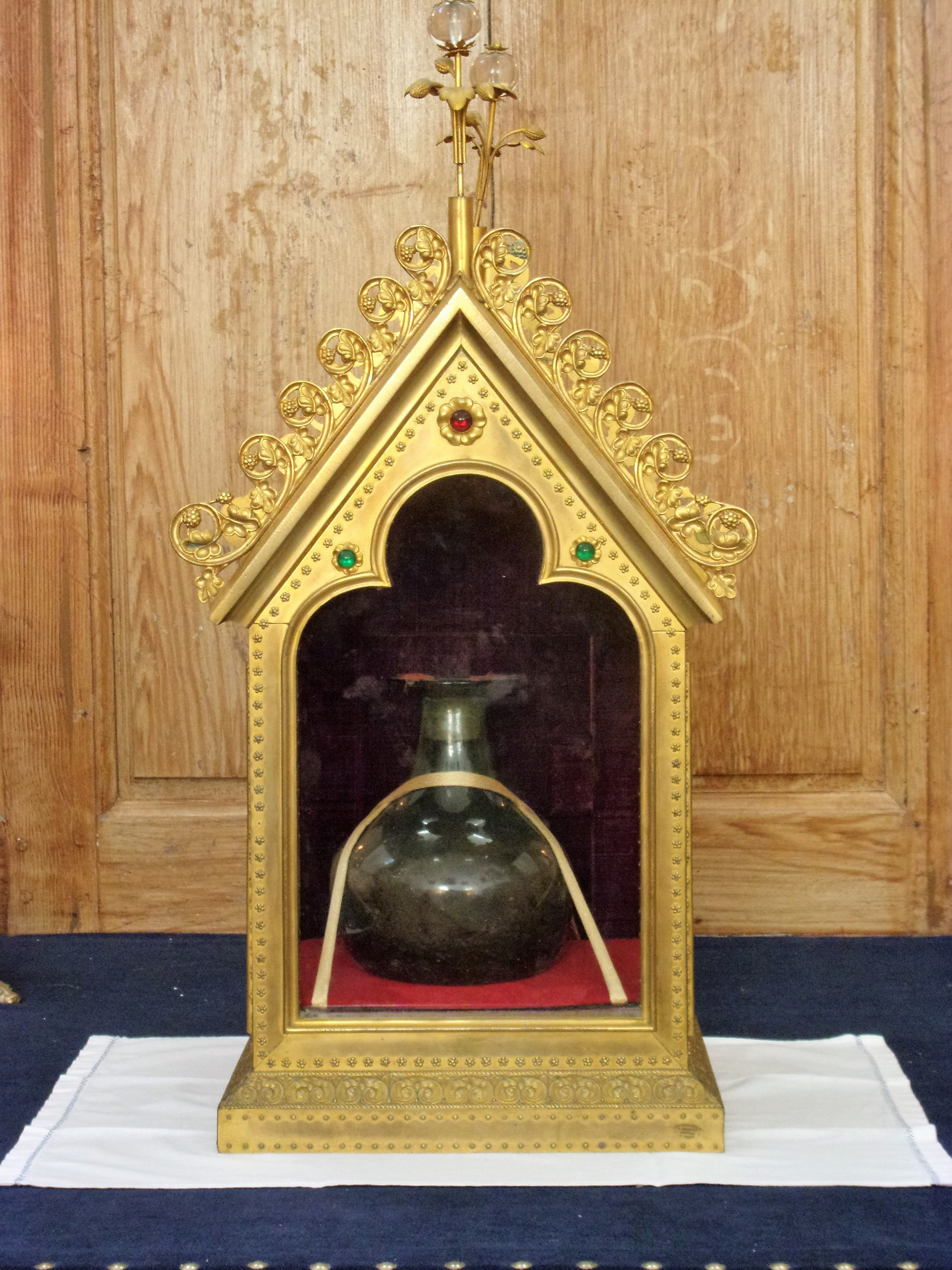
Vial containing the relics of the Theban martyrs.

A restoration campaign was undertaken in 1852 following damage caused by an earthquake in 1840, the same year the Collegiate Church of Saint-Martin of Candes was included in the first list of 934 buildings classified as historical monuments. Prosper Mérimée, Inspector General of Historical Monuments, had visited the church in 1836 and submitted a report in 1851 recommending restoration. The restoration work, directed by architect Charles Joly-Leterme, continued until 1856. During this phase, numerous decorative elements were removed or altered, including altar stones that were reused as steps or floor slabs in the nave. These interventions were later criticized by historians in the 1880s, with some referring to them as acts of “vandalism.” (Note: Lesoing 2016, p. 115) (Note: This “benevolent vandalism,” denounced by Louis Réau, is not unique to Candes.) During the relocation of the high altar, a vial believed to have contained the blood of the martyrs of the Theban Legion and brought back by Saint Martin was discovered. (Note: A notice dated 1783 indicates that an analysis of the relics was carried out that year at the request of Father Maronneau, newly appointed to the parish of Candes. The chemist in charge of the analysis concluded that it was “blood or flesh soaked in blood,” (Note: Lesoing 2016, p. 117) but the report is not mentioned in other sources.) The relics were authenticated by Archbishop Colet of Tours in 1875. Additional repairs were carried out on the façade and porch in 1882, and the interior decoration of the Saint-Martin Chapel was redone during the final decades of the 19th century.

==== 20th and 21st centuries ====
Angelo Giuseppe Roncalli, the future Pope John XXIII and apostolic nuncio to France as of December 1944, visited the Collegiate Church of Saint-Martin of Candes in the early months of 1945.

Since 1959, the church has no longer had a resident priest. A single priest now serves the entire Sainte-Jeanne-d’Arc parish, which includes the commune of Candes-Saint-Martin. (Note: Gourdin 1997, p. 125) Liturgical services at the church are supported by seminarians and priests from the Saint-Martin community.

In 1982, a structural crack appeared in the façade, leading to a partial collapse of the crenellations the following year. Consolidation work was carried out promptly. (Note: Gourdin 1997, p. 118) A major restoration campaign was launched in 2013, focusing on the building’s framework, roofing, masonry, and electrical systems. Completed in 2015, the restoration was followed by an interior reorganization in preparation for the 1,700th anniversary of the birth of Saint Martin in 2016, during which various events, including ceremonies and concerts, were held in the church.

== Architecture ==
Schematic plan of the collegiate church (Note: The 15th-century fortification phase, concerning the upper parts of the building, is not represented.) late 11th or early 12th century second half of 12th century first quarter of 13th century after 1225 modern

The general plan of the Collegiate Church of Saint-Martin of Candes is complex and difficult to interpret due to numerous modifications over time. The original design, likely influenced by preexisting structures and the site’s topography, was altered during various renovation and reconstruction phases. As a result, few interior spaces are defined by strictly parallel walls. The church is constructed on leveled terrain, which was excavated to the south and filled to the north; the north arm of the transept appears to be built over a vaulted substructure.

Despite the absence of significant relics of Saint Martin and the lack of an ambulatory around the choir, the church seems to have been conceived with the characteristics of a pilgrimage site. The masonry combines a hard, lacustrine limestone of modest visual appeal in the lower sections with lighter, more visually refined but fragile tuffeau—white or yellow—in the upper parts. The roof is covered with slate. (Note: Gourdin 1997, p. 116) The building follows a Latin cross plan, oriented from northwest to southeast to accommodate the natural slope of the site. The nave includes two simple side aisles. The church’s interior measures 41.80 meters in length and 22.42 meters in width at the transept. (Note: Boissenot 2011, p. 209) The choir, executed in a late Romanesque style, terminates in three apses; the northernmost is traditionally associated with the location of Saint Martin’s death. The rounded vaults of the nave and transept are reminiscent of the Angevin Gothic style. (Note: In this sense, Yvonne Labande-Mailfert and D. Manson note that the “verticality” of the columns in the nave, shaped like “bundles,” also seems to contribute to a Gothic style. In this case, this architectural element is a characteristic of Gothic churches in northern France.) During the second construction phase, adjustments to the alignment of columns—particularly on the north side of the nave—were necessary to connect the façade with the existing choir. All windows feature rounded arches.

One distinctive feature of the Collegiate Church of Saint-Martin of Candes is the combination of religious and military architectural elements. The building integrates late Romanesque and early Gothic styles in its ecclesiastical structure, while also incorporating defensive features. Four square towers—two flanking the north porch, the main entrance, and two at the west façade—are topped with crenellations and machicolations, indicating a fortification function. These features suggest that the church was intended to serve as a place of refuge for the local population in times of conflict. Some scholars consider the building, due to its architectural qualities and decorative richness, to be the second most significant religious edifice in the department of Indre-et-Loire, after the Cathedral of Saint-Gatien in Tours.

=== Choir and transept ===
The construction of the choir and transept of the Collegiate Church of Saint-Martin of Candes occurred in successive phases, and efforts to achieve architectural and spatial coherence were only partially effective. The presence of an earlier structure at the level of the north chapel created significant constraints. This chapel includes a notably thick wall that contains a passageway leading to the north arm of the transept. This wall may have supported a bell tower belonging to a preexisting building. In the rest of the choir, differences in the vaults of the main apse and the southern apsidiole are attributed to 18th-century restoration work rather than to stylistic development during the original construction. Additionally, the south chapel is considerably wider than the apsidiole at its end, suggesting that this section was modified by combining the original chapel, its apsidiole, and an adjacent external chapel into a single space. A niche in the southwest corner of the transept provides access to a sealed well, the function of which—whether practical or ritual—remains uncertain.

Many of the vault keystones in the transept and nave are unfinished, a condition previously interpreted as evidence of an incomplete medieval construction. However, these features are now understood to result from 18th-century repairs that were either left unfinished or intentionally simplified.

Choir, chapels and transept.

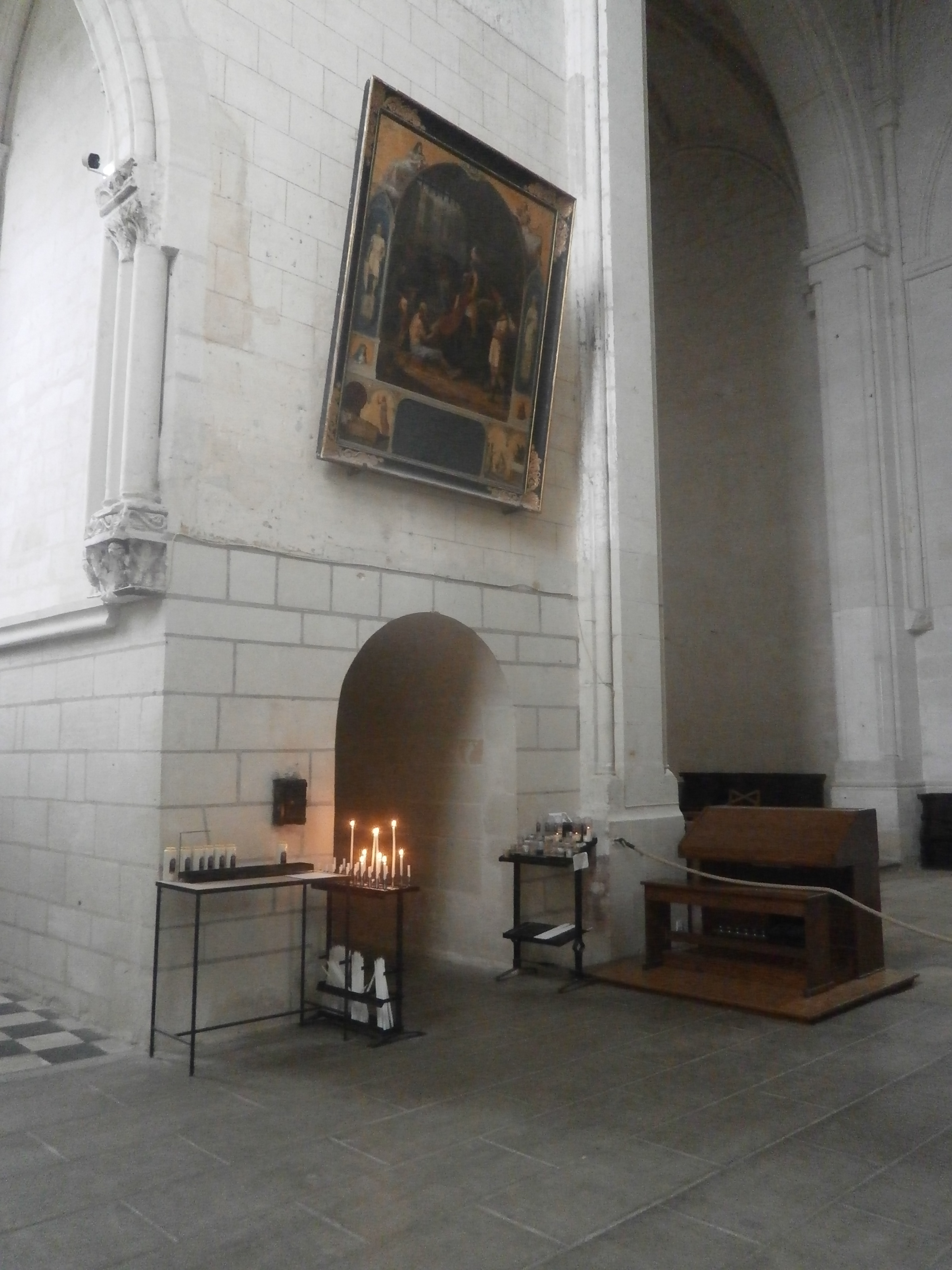
Entrance to the Saint-Martin chapel.

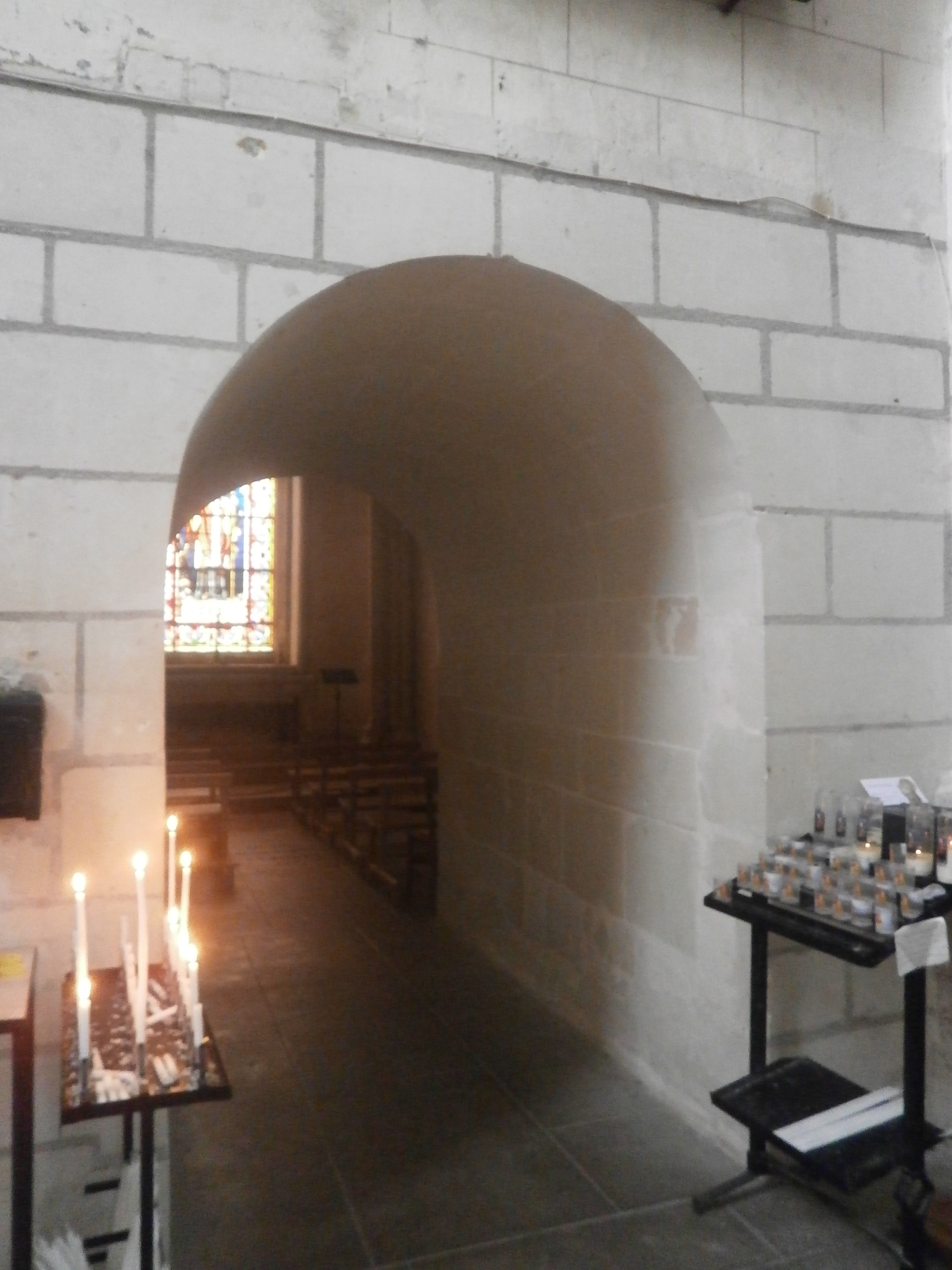
Close-up of the entrance to the Saint-Martin chapel.

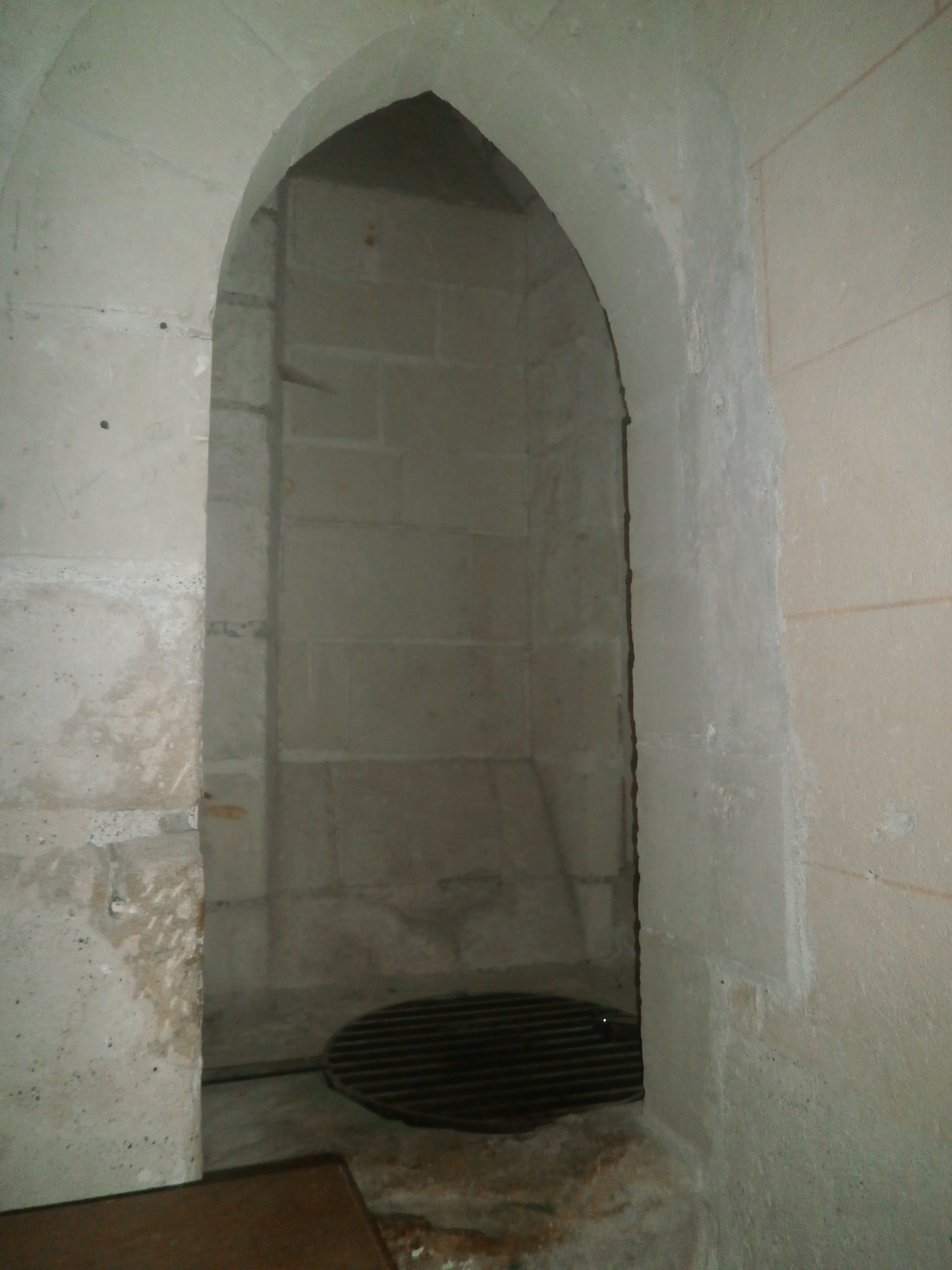
Well in the transept.

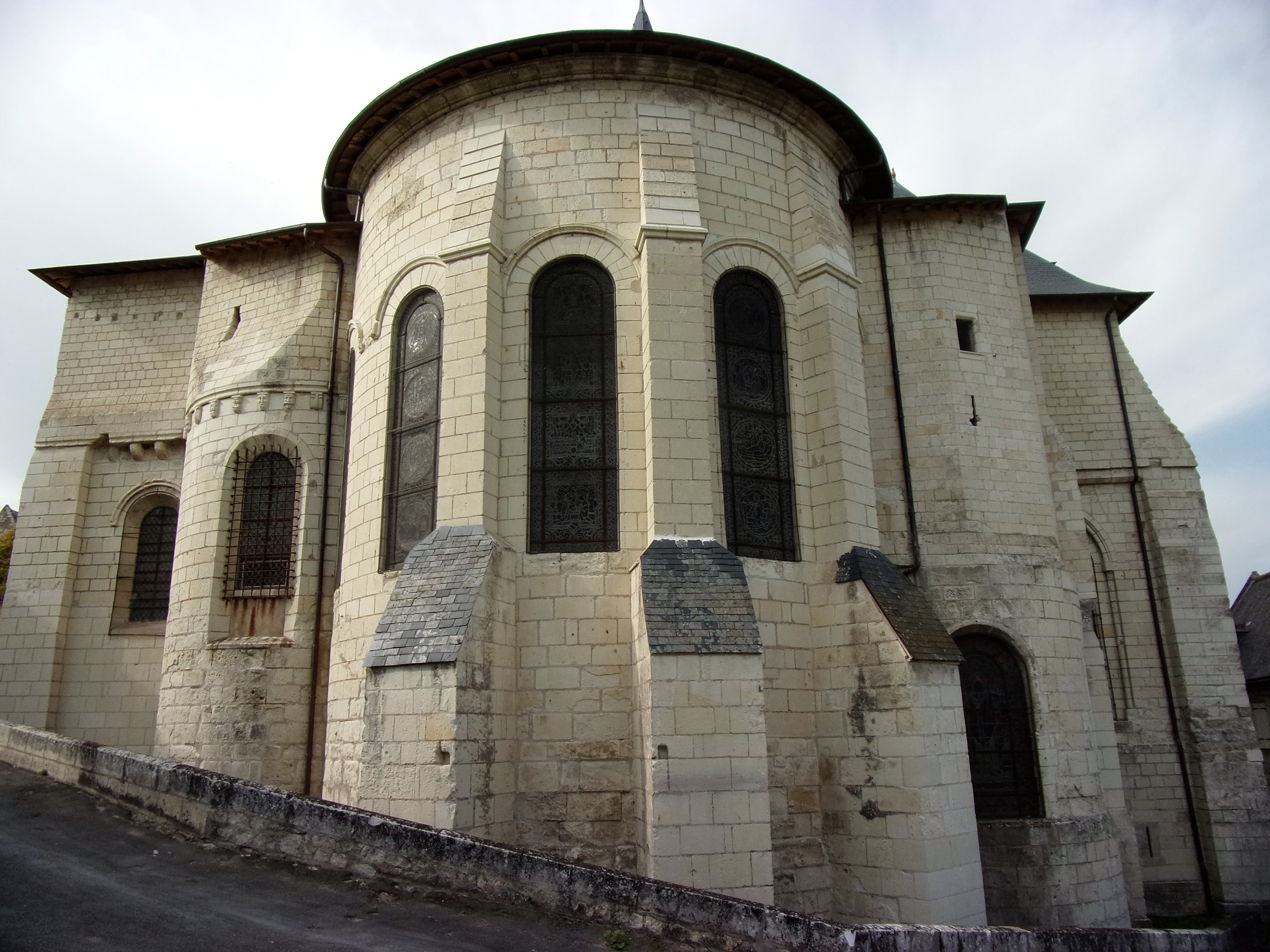
Exterior view of the choir.

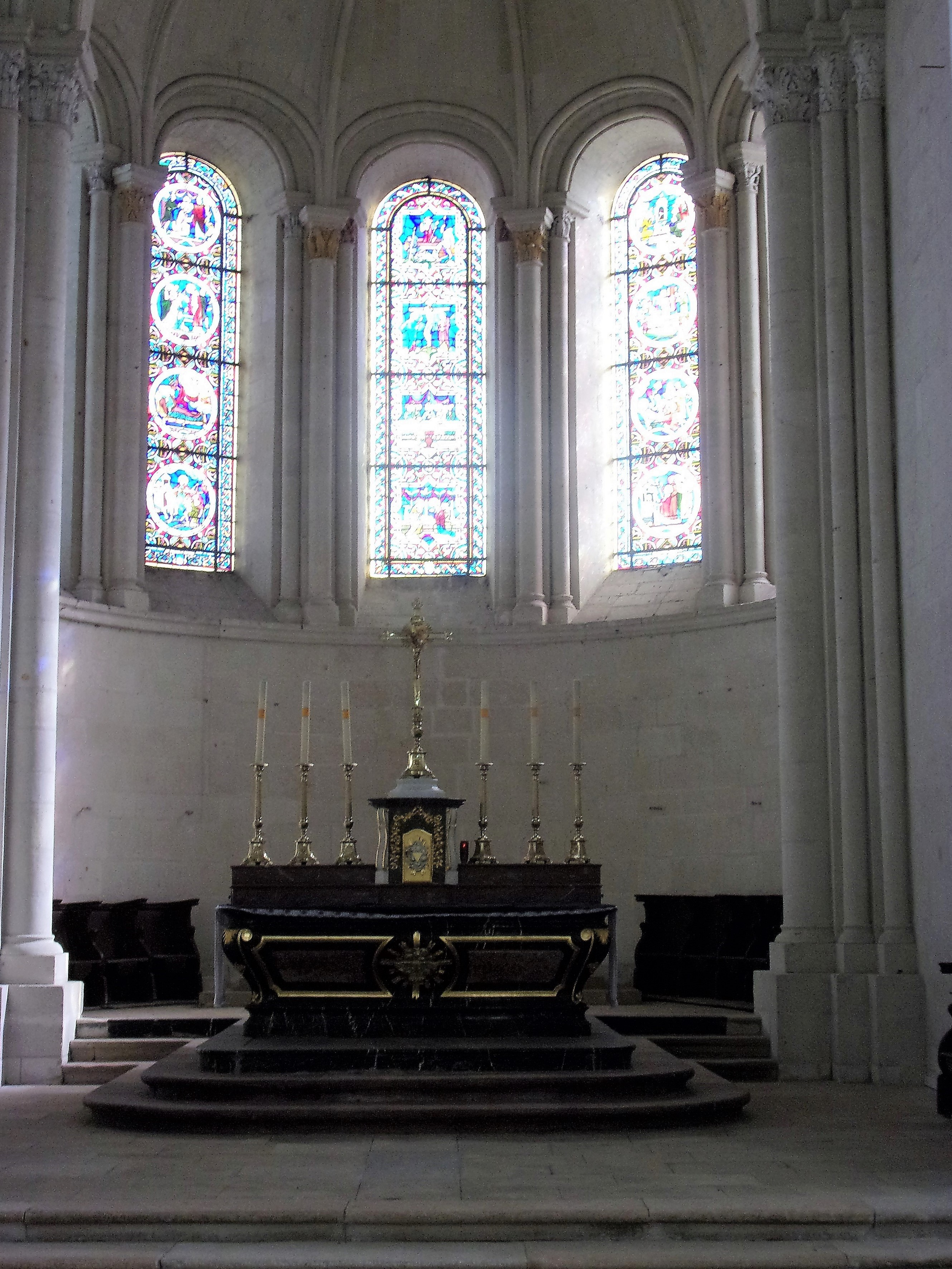
Interior view of the choir.

=== Nave ===
According to plans attributed to a master builder referred to by scholars as the “Master of Candes,” the nave of the Collegiate Church of Saint-Martin consists of a central vessel flanked by two simple side aisles of equal height. This configuration classifies the church as a hall church, or "three-nave church," as noted by Pierre Sesmat. The nave is divided into four bays, each illuminated by narrow, tall, round-arched windows. Although the central vessel and side aisles share the same vault height, the side aisles are narrower near the transept, resulting in more domed vaults. The layout, inspired by the Cathedral of Poitiers, required significant adaptation to connect with the existing transept. This led to a gradual widening of the central vessel toward the north, reducing the width of the north aisle, while the south exterior wall exhibits a slight curve. On the exterior, buttresses are positioned between each window bay, articulating the division of the bays.

The four bays of the central vessel and its aisles are rib-vaulted, with each panel featuring liernes. The vaults rest on corbels adorned with human figures along the walls and are supported internally by clustered pillars composed of four columns and eight colonnettes. Despite the nave’s relatively modest height of 18 meters, the vertical emphasis of the column architecture contributes to a sense of height. The elevated position of the vaults above the wall ribs reflects stylistic elements typical of western Gothic architecture.

Two doorways are present in the south wall of the nave, one of which is now sealed. The remaining door, aligned with the north porch, led toward the medieval cemetery and may have served as a “Door of the Dead,” although this function is not definitively confirmed.

Nave

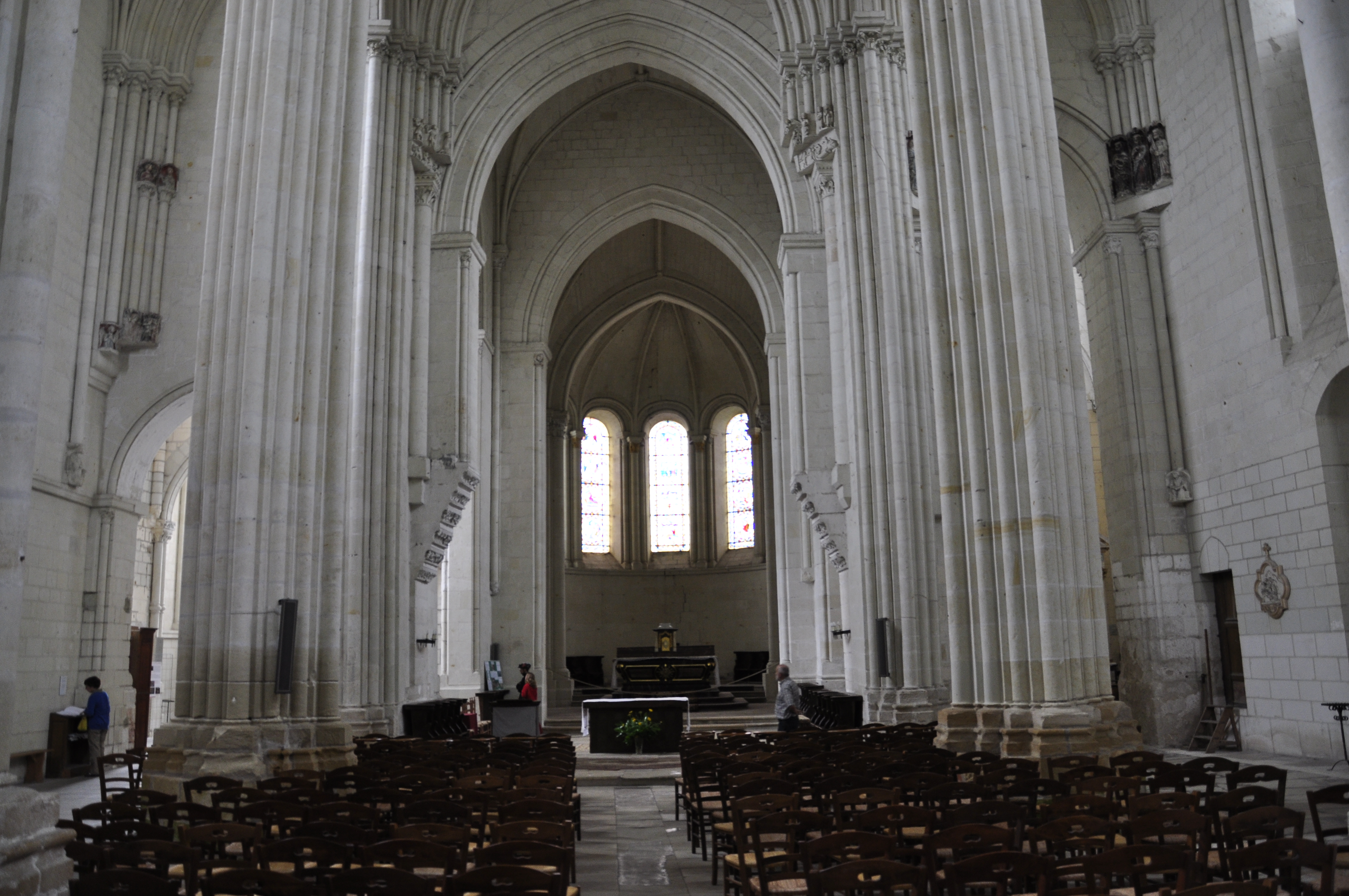
Interior view of the nave.

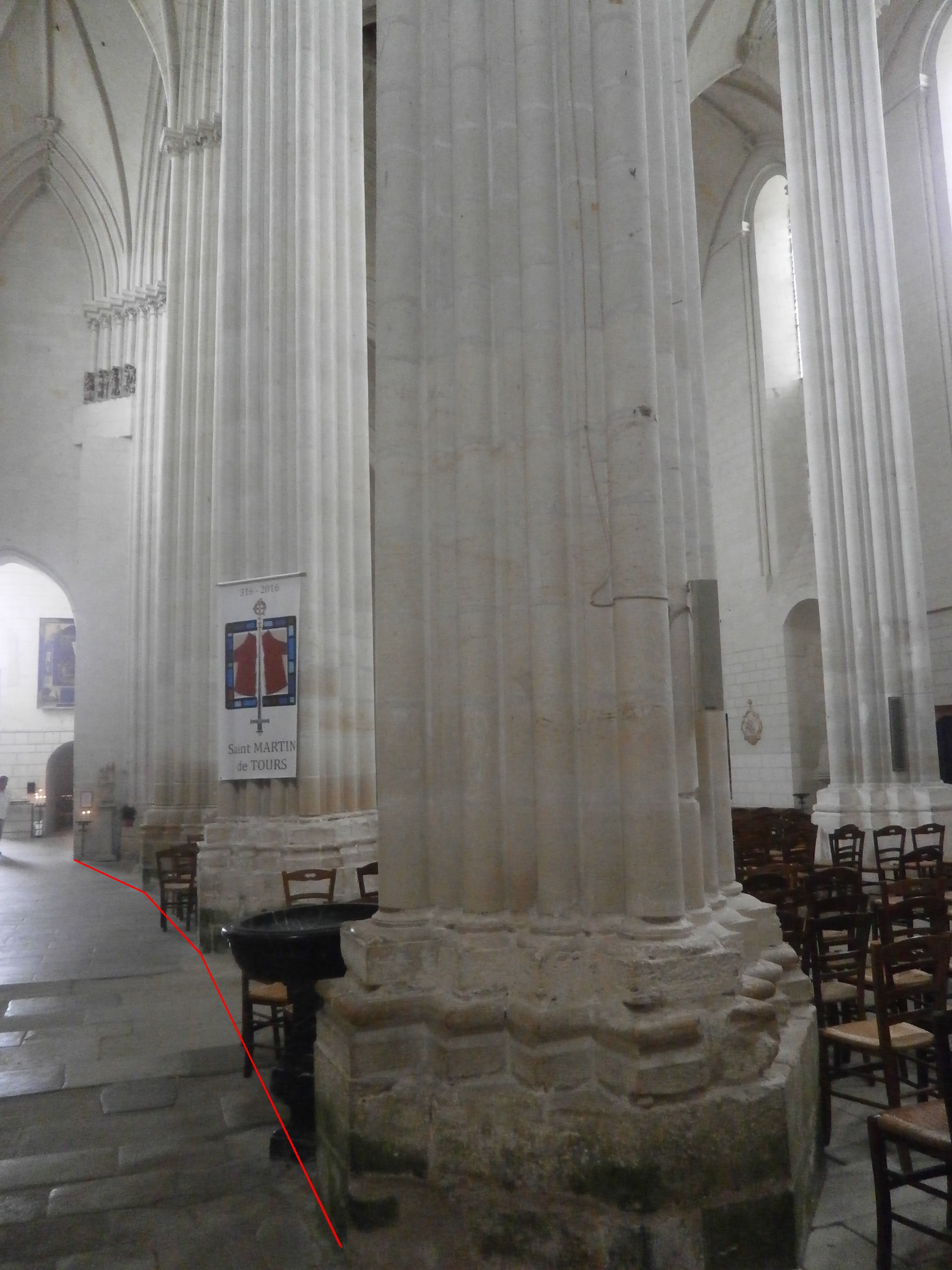
Misalignment of the nave's north pillars. (Note: The bases of the pillars are connected by a broken red line indicating the misalignment.)

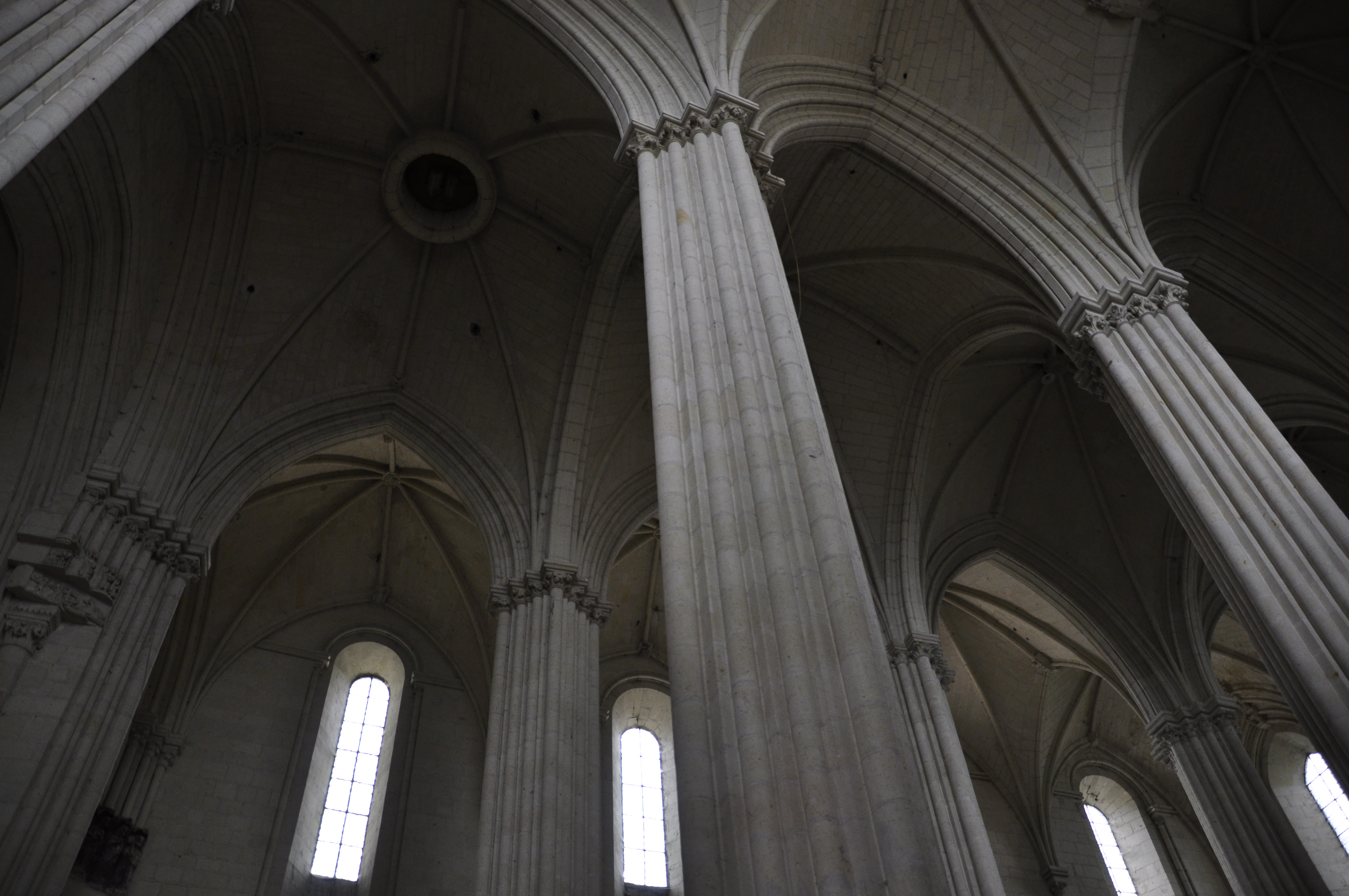
Vaulting system in the nave.

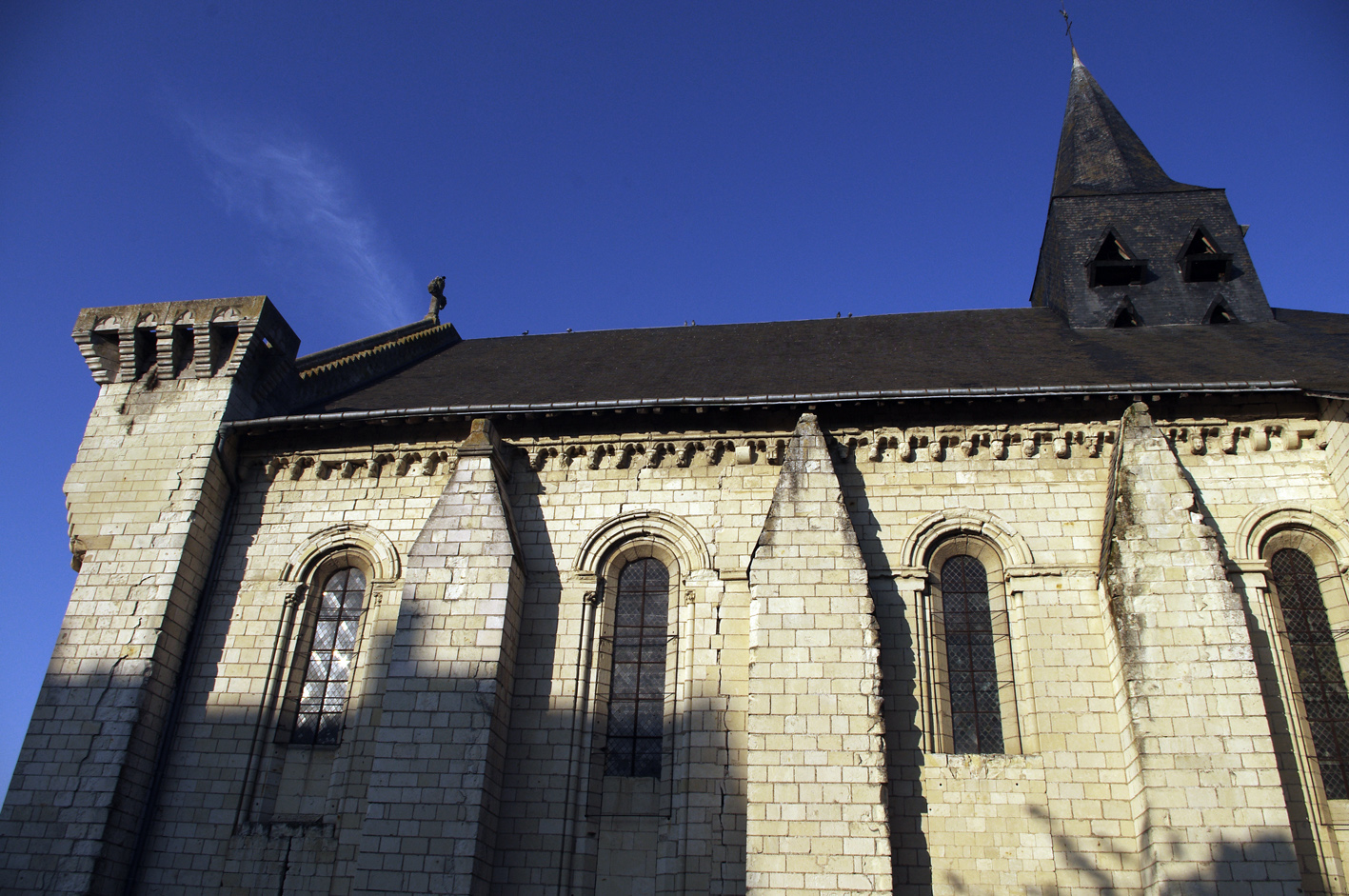
South wall of the nave. (Note: A vertical crack is visible in the second bay from the left. It corresponds to the resumption of construction work on the nave, which had been temporarily halted to build the north porch.)

=== West façade ===
The west façade (Note: Yves Blomme notes, regarding, among other things, the façades of the church of Candes and that of Notre-Dame de La Couture (Le Mans): The influence of Notre-Dame de Paris is evident at least up to the level of the rose window. — Yves Blomme, 2002, p. 155.) of the Collegiate Church of Saint-Martin is flanked by two substantial masonry structures functioning as corner towers. These are accompanied by intermediate buttresses topped with engaged pinnacles, which are integrated into the overall decorative composition. The central section features a single pointed-arch portal, surmounted by a colonnade and an arcade that extends across the buttresses. Above this are a rose window and an empty niche, with a round-arched window on either side of the buttresses completing the arrangement. In the 15th century, the corner towers were adapted for defensive purposes and were topped with machicolations and crenellations. A spiral staircase in the northwest tower provides access to the upper level, from which an open-air walkway extends along the roof slopes, connecting the tops of the other towers. Each of the towers originally featured a pyramidal roof, which appears to have been removed during 19th-century restoration campaigns. These pyramidal elements are still visible in a 1699 watercolor by Louis Boudan (Gaignières collection) and a photograph taken before the restoration led by architect Henri Deverin in 1882. Because of its proximity to the hillside and the limited clearance in front of the portal, the west square is very narrow and was never used as the church's main entrance.

West facade.

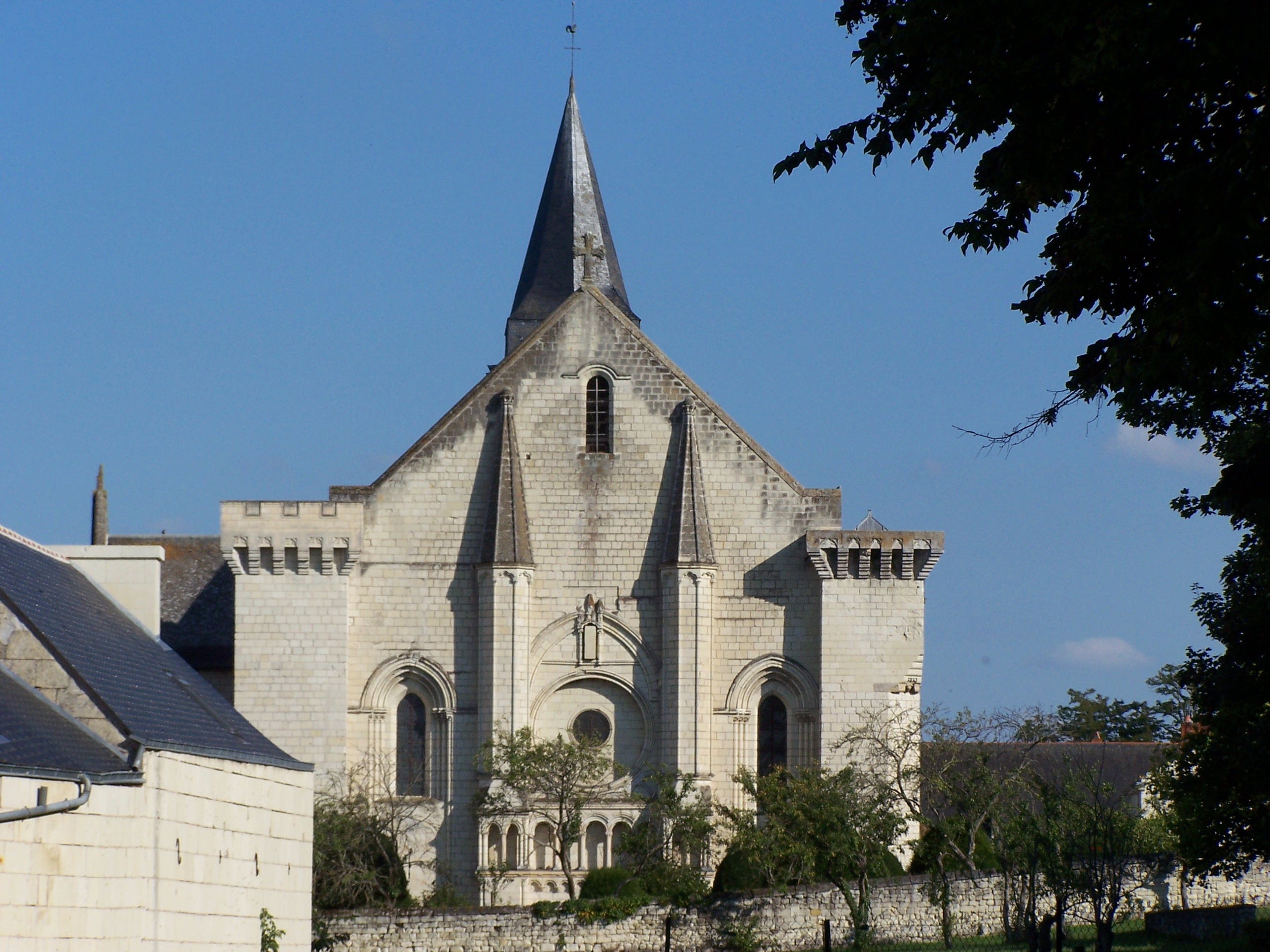
West facade, general view.

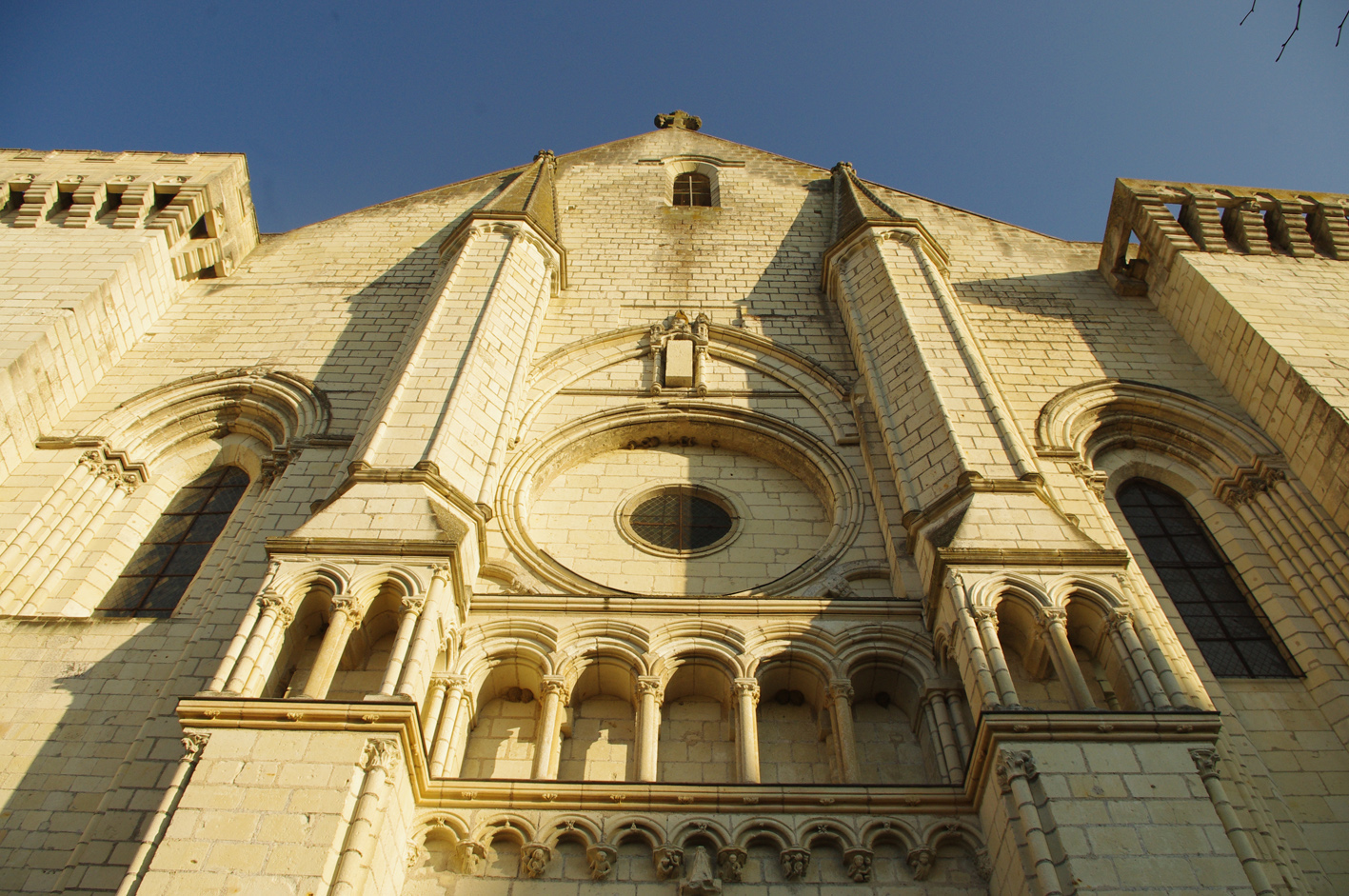
West facade, close-up view.

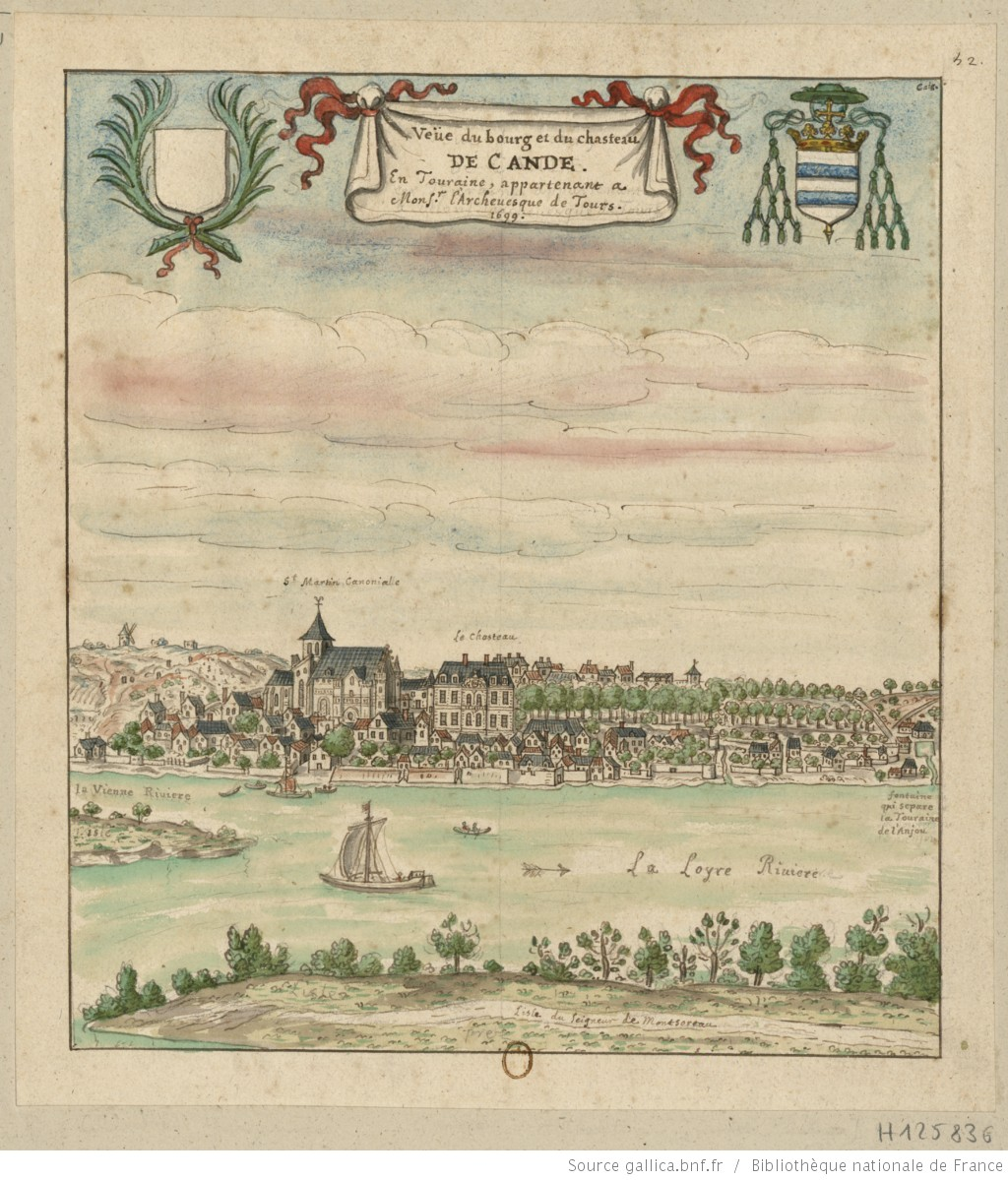
Candes and its collegiate church in 1699.

=== North porch and Saint Michael’s chapel ===
Designed as the primary entrance for pilgrims, the pointed-arch portal of the Collegiate Church of Saint-Martin is accessed by a staircase of seven steps to accommodate the elevation difference between the northern forecourt and the porch floor. The portal façade is articulated into three decorative levels that interrupt the otherwise plain wall surface. The lowest level, corresponding to the entry door, includes fourteen statues—some unfinished—separated by engaged colonnettes. The intermediate level, of equal height, features columns without statuary. The upper level, separated from the middle tier by a cornice with alternating carved heads and corbels, presents statues resting on the capitals of the lower columns, while the separating colonnettes rest on the corbels. A bretèche, added during the fortification of the church and accessible from a modified window in the chapel above the porch, partially obscures the decoration at this upper level. (Note: Mussat 1963, p. 384)

The portal opens into a large porch measuring approximately 9.50 × 5 meters, aligned with the second bay of the nave. The porch, composed of three bays, is covered with rib vaults supported centrally by a monolithic column (Note: Drawing a parallel with the three columns located in the narthex of the Sainte-Radegonde Chapel in Chinon and the one erected on the façade of the north porch of the collegiate church, medievalist Nurith Kenaan-Kedar suggests that this type of isolated elevation reflects a form of "commemorative architecture.") bearing the eight ribs of the middle vault. The interior of the porch is decorated with a series of statues set between colonnettes, some of which, including vault keystones, remain unfinished. (Note: Mussat 1963, p. 385) At the rear, the entrance into the church is topped by three small pointed arches that support a tympanum, also partially sculpted.

Above the porch is a vaulted space known as the "Saint Michael’s Chapel," consisting of three bays directly superimposed on those of the porch. Access is provided via a narrow staircase built into the wall and connected to the spiral stair in the northwest façade tower. A window from the chapel opens into the nave. The presence of this chapel above the main entrance has led to several interpretations regarding its function. According to Sara Lutan, the structure may have been designed to host high-ranking individuals, such as royalty, who could attend services from the chapel. The dedication to Saint Michael—often associated with royal or imperial authority—supports this interpretation. Alternatively, Claude Boissenot has proposed that the sculptural program of the porch centers on the House of Blois and Count Odo II, with Saint Martin depicted as interceding on his behalf. In this view, the chapel may have originally been dedicated to the ruling family (Note: Boissenot 2011, pp. 189–190) rather than to Saint Michael. (Note: Boissenot 2011, p. 212) Its exact purpose remains uncertain but is presumed to have held symbolic or functional significance.

North porch and Saint-Michel chapel.

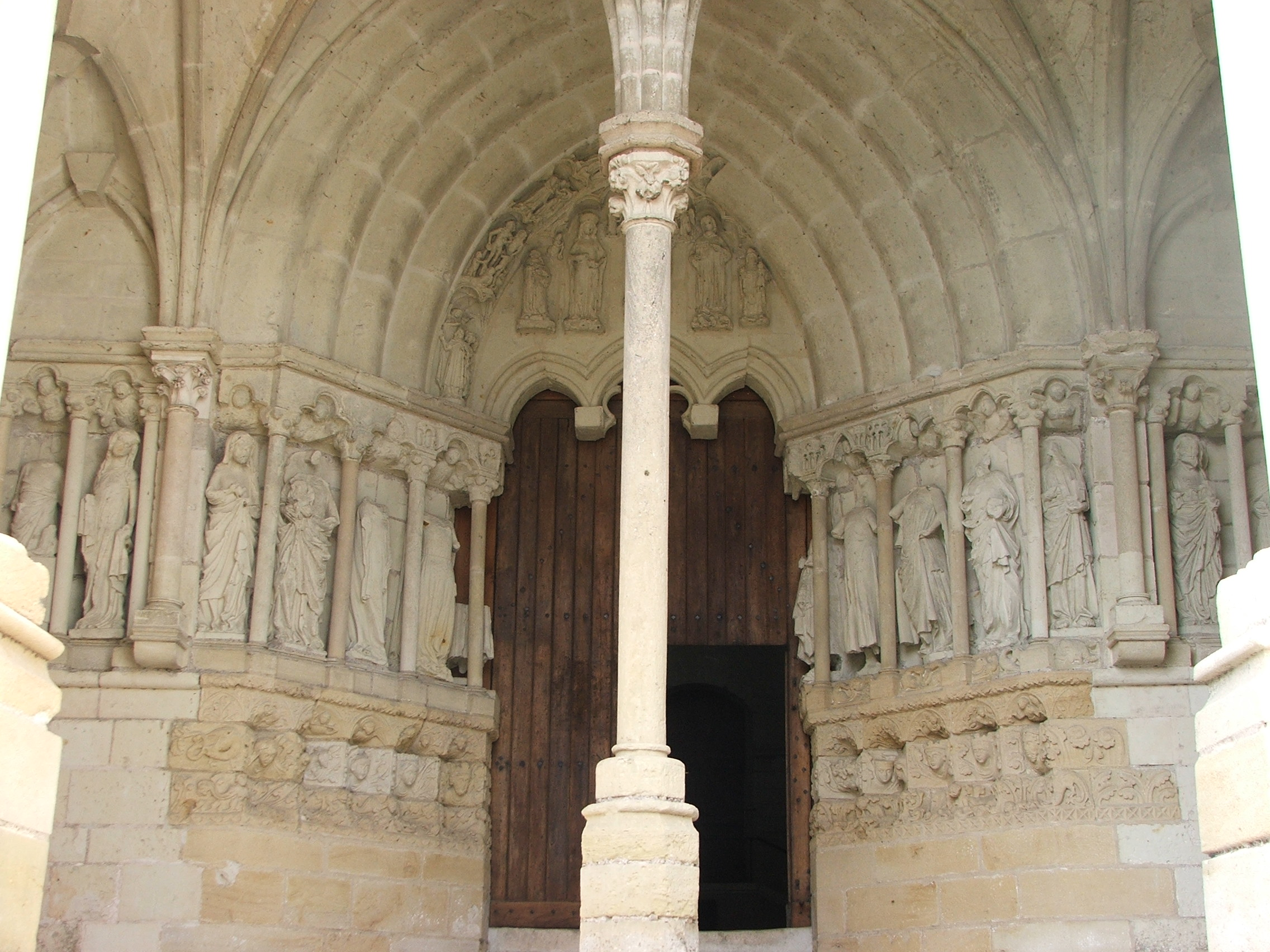
Interior view of the porch.

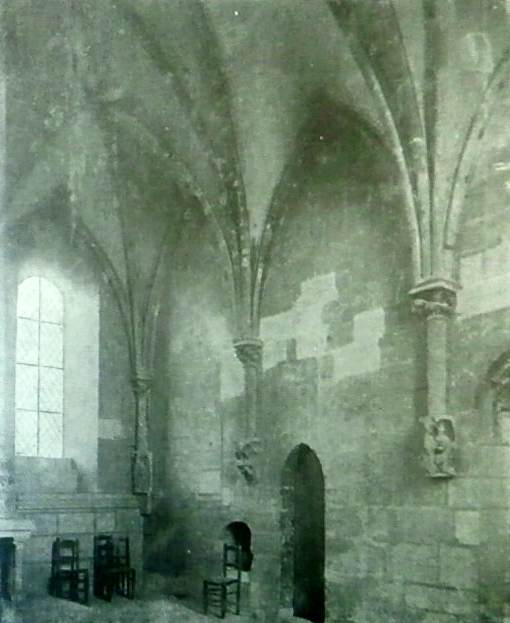
Saint-Michel chapel.

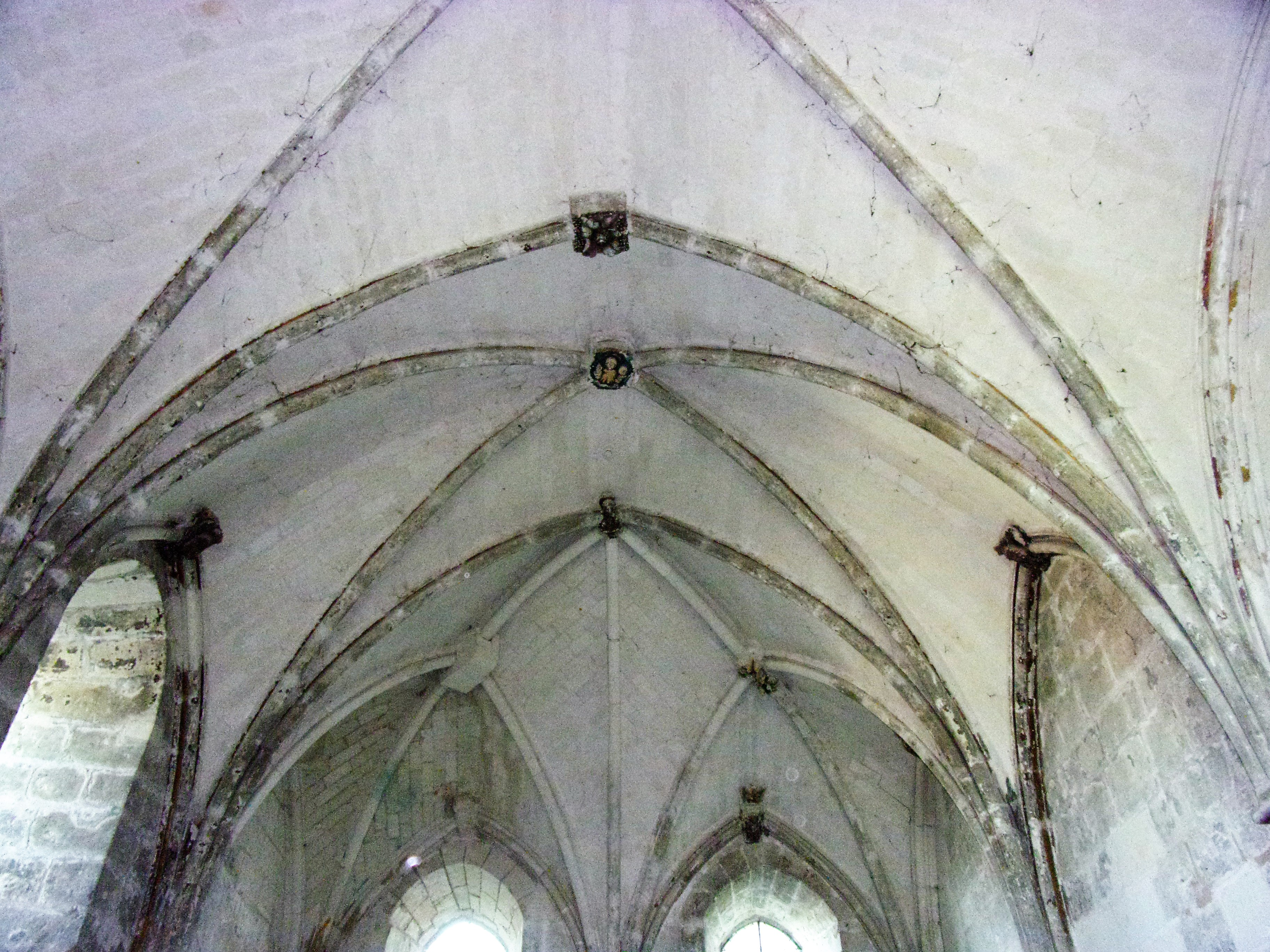
Detail of chapel vaults.

== Decoration and furnishings ==
=== Decoration ===
As construction progressed at the Collegiate Church of Saint-Martin in Candes, several sculptors contributed to its decoration, resulting in notable stylistic variations among elements such as statues, capitals, and vault keystones. Art historian André Mussat, based on a detailed stylistic analysis, proposed the identification of four distinct sculptural hands, although some statues do not conform to any of these categories. The "Master of Figurines," active from the late 12th century, worked on the choir and nave and is attributed with finely executed and realistic small figures, including representations of Roi David, Vieillard de l'Apocalypse (King David and an Elder of the Apocalypse). (Note: Mussat 1964, p. 510) Working contemporaneously, the "Master of Saint Martin"—possibly a local sculptor—produced works in a more simplified style and is named after a statue of Saint Martin attributed to him. (Note: Mussat 1964, p. 511) The "Master of the Eighteen Statues," active between 1220 and 1240, is credited with figures such as the Reine de Saba, Abraham (Queen of Sheba and Abraham). Toward the end of the 13th century, the "Master of the Apostles" focused on the porch and is thought to have sculpted much of the upper register of its façade, including statues of Saint Peter and Saint John. This artist may have originated from the Moulins region. (Note: Mussat 1964, p. 513)

The diversity of styles observed at Candes has been linked to the possible passage of itinerant sculptors, some of whom may have been pilgrims en route to Santiago de Compostela who temporarily joined the construction site. Similar stylistic features can be found in other religious structures in the region, including the former convent of Saint-Jean-de-l’Habit in Fontevraud, the commandery of Les Moulins in Bournand, and the church of Le Puy-Notre-Dame.

==== Choir, transept, and nave ====
In the 1880s, under the direction of architect Henri Deverin, the choir, sacristy, and Saint Martin Chapel of the Collegiate Church of Candes-Saint-Martin were given their current appearance. (Note: Lesoing 2016, p. 118)

The stained glass windows in the Saint Martin Chapel are generally attributed to the Parisian glassmaker Claudius Lavergne, although the window depicting the removal of Saint Martin’s body—set in the north round-arched bay—may have been produced by the studio of François-Léon Bigot of Tours, a collaborator of Lucien-Léopold Lobin. According to tradition, this window represents the event in which the monks of Tours removed Martin’s body from Candes. A cenotaph with a recumbent statue of Saint Martin is placed in a modern niche between the chapel and the choir apse.

Decoration for the Saint-Martin chapel.

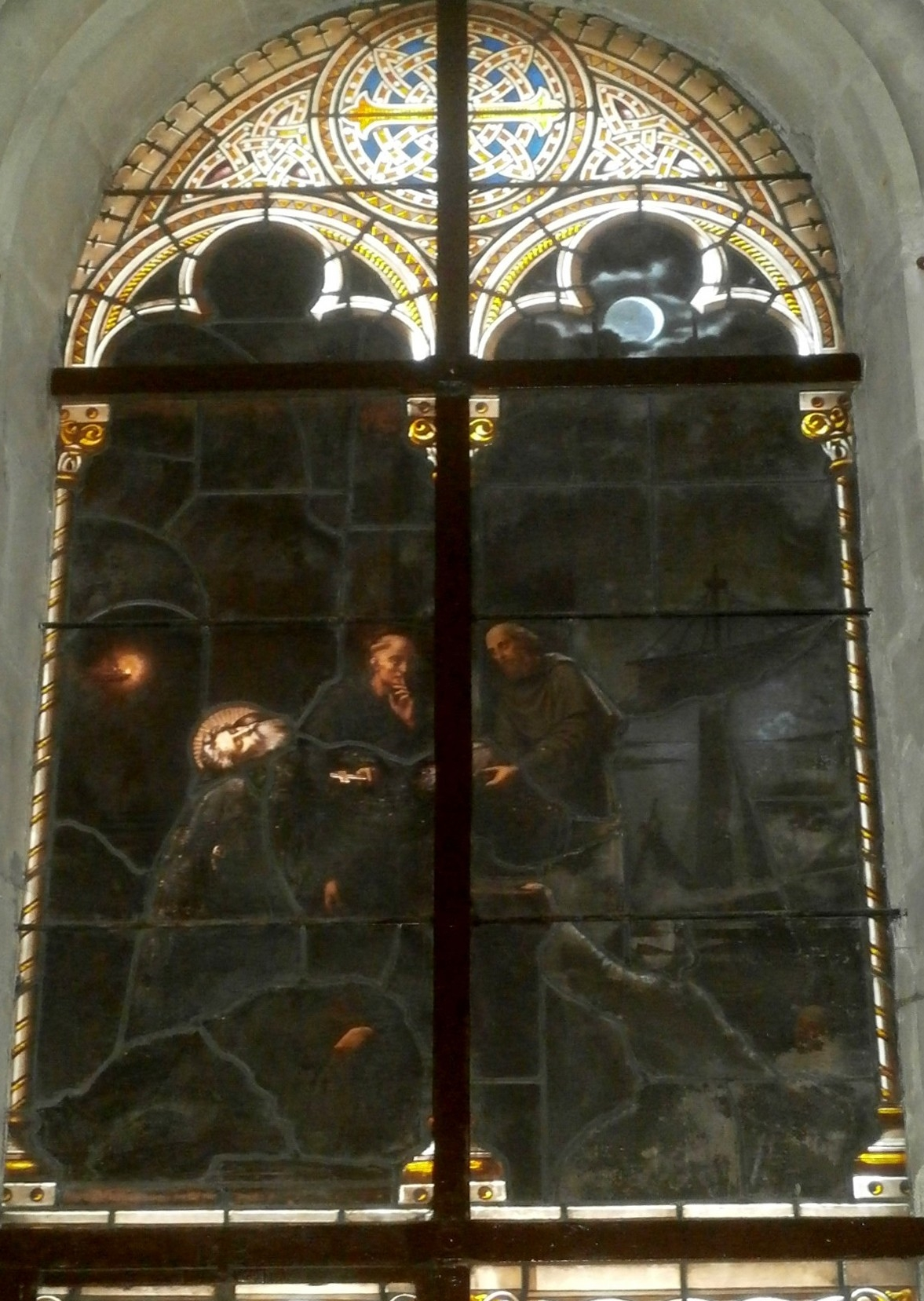
Stained glass window with the removal of the body.

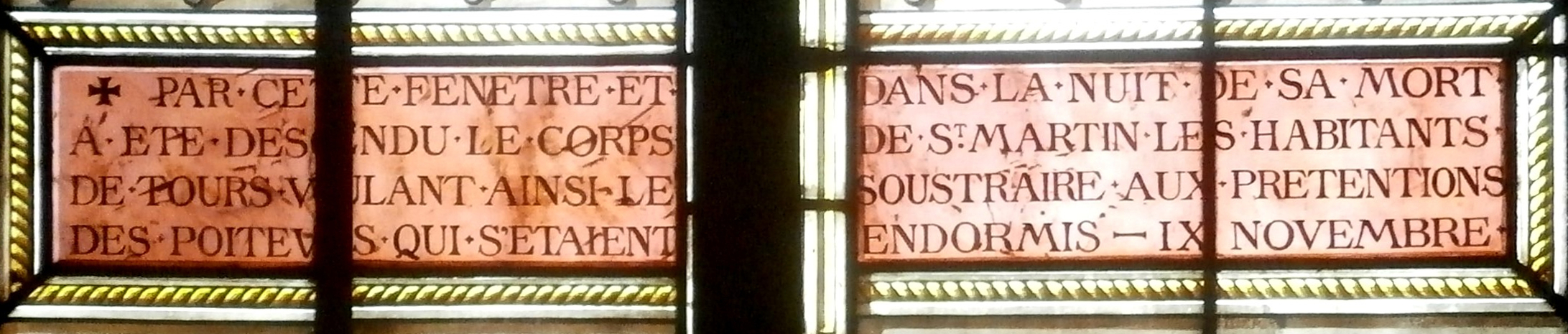
Detail of the stained glass window with the removal of the body.

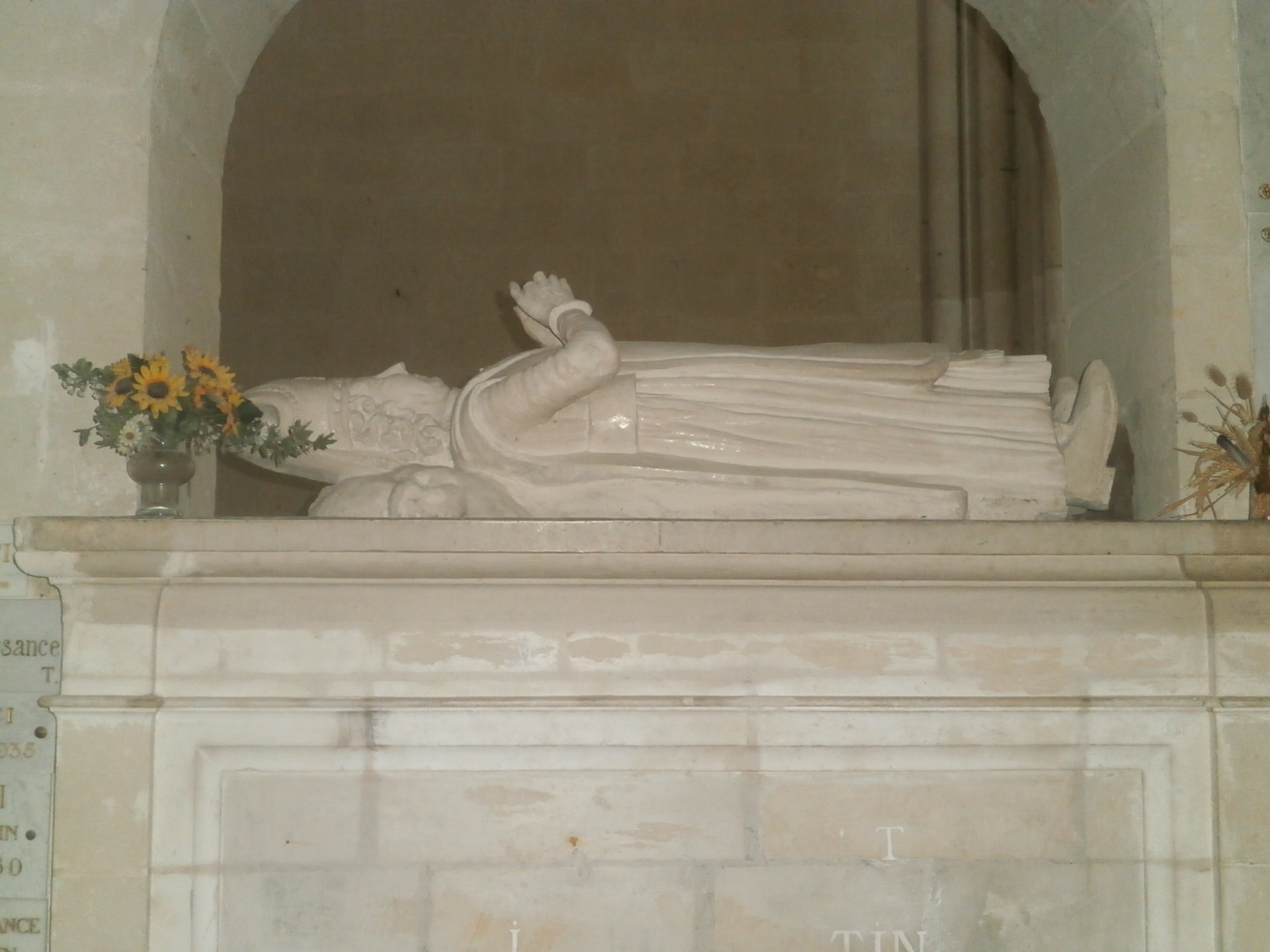
Cenotaph with Martin recumbent.

The sculptural decoration of the choir is influenced by Western Gothic art, including capitals adorned with multiple rows of acanthus leaves, vegetal motifs, and figures from mythological or fantastical bestiaries. In contrast, the decorative elements of the transept and nave primarily depict biblical scenes. While the overall structure of the sculptural program remains uncertain, the themes of resurrection and the parousia appear frequently in the choir, transept, and nave. Many of the statuettes and sculptural groups located on pillars or arch bases are polychrome. Some sculptures may be 19th-century castings that replaced original works during restoration campaigns. The large stained glass windows of the choir were created in 1900 by Félix Gaudin, a Parisian master glazier. (Note: Lesoing 2016, pp. 118–119)

Decorating the choir, transept and nave.

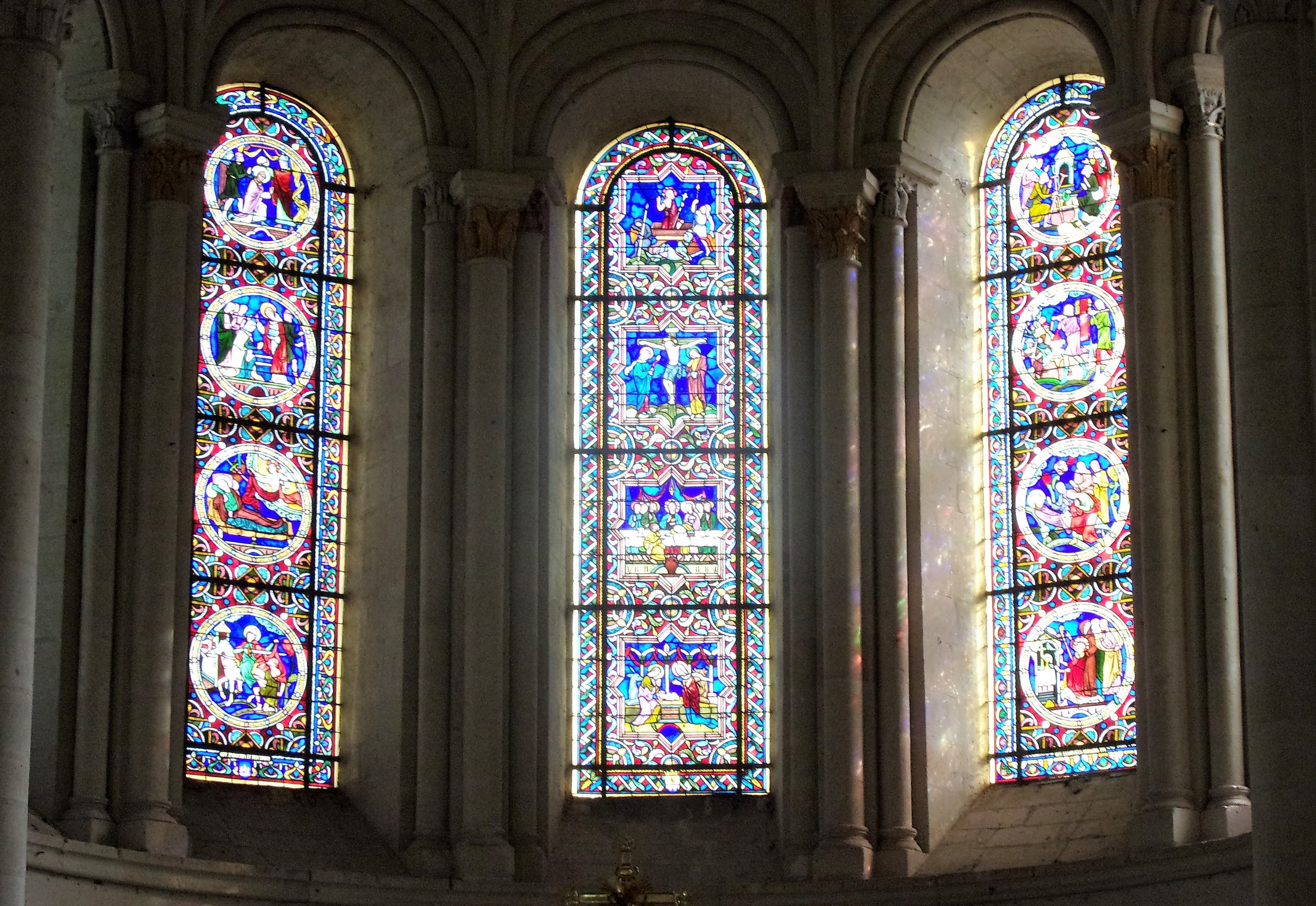
Choir windows.

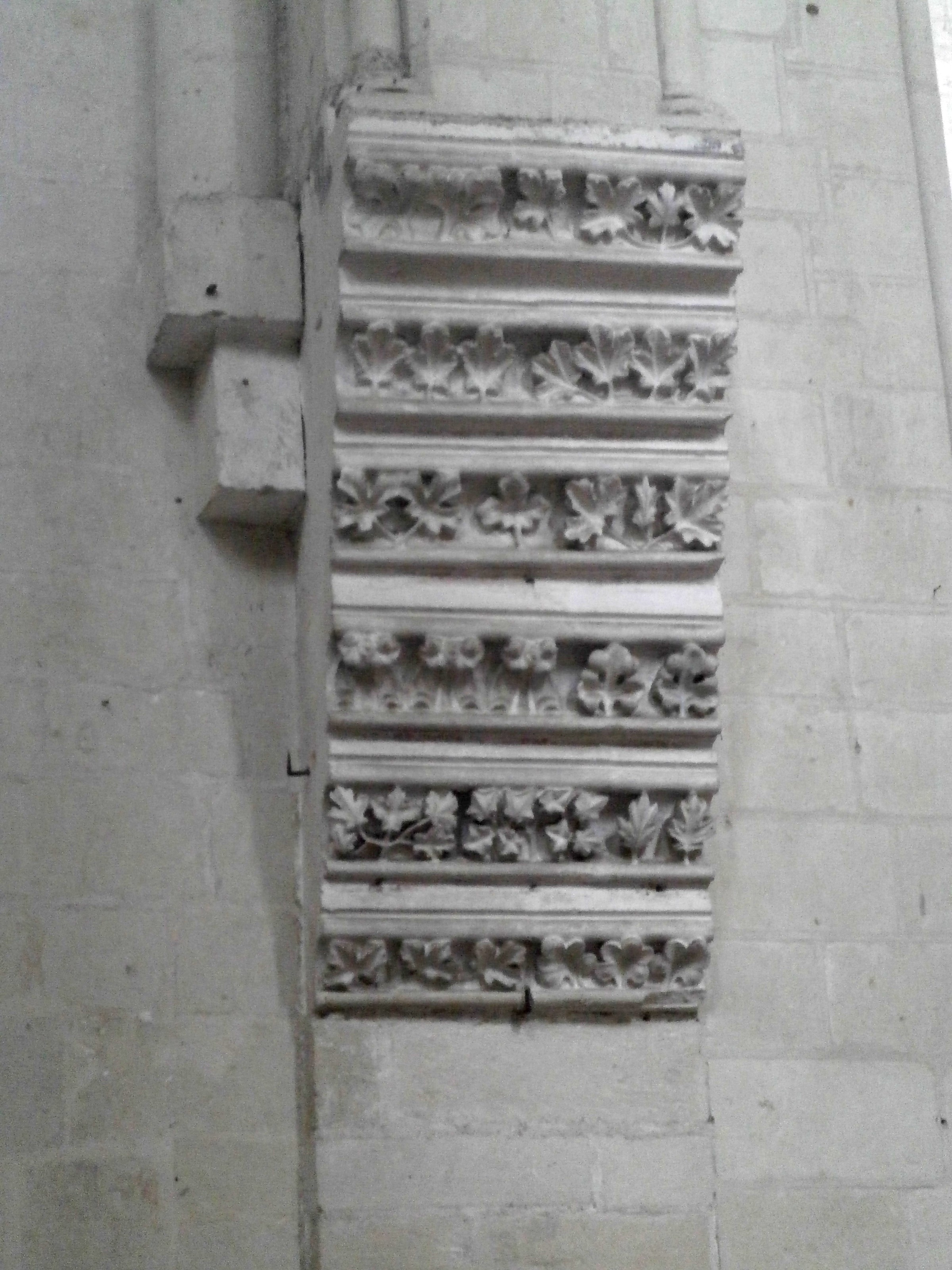
Capital with plant motifs (nave-transept connection).

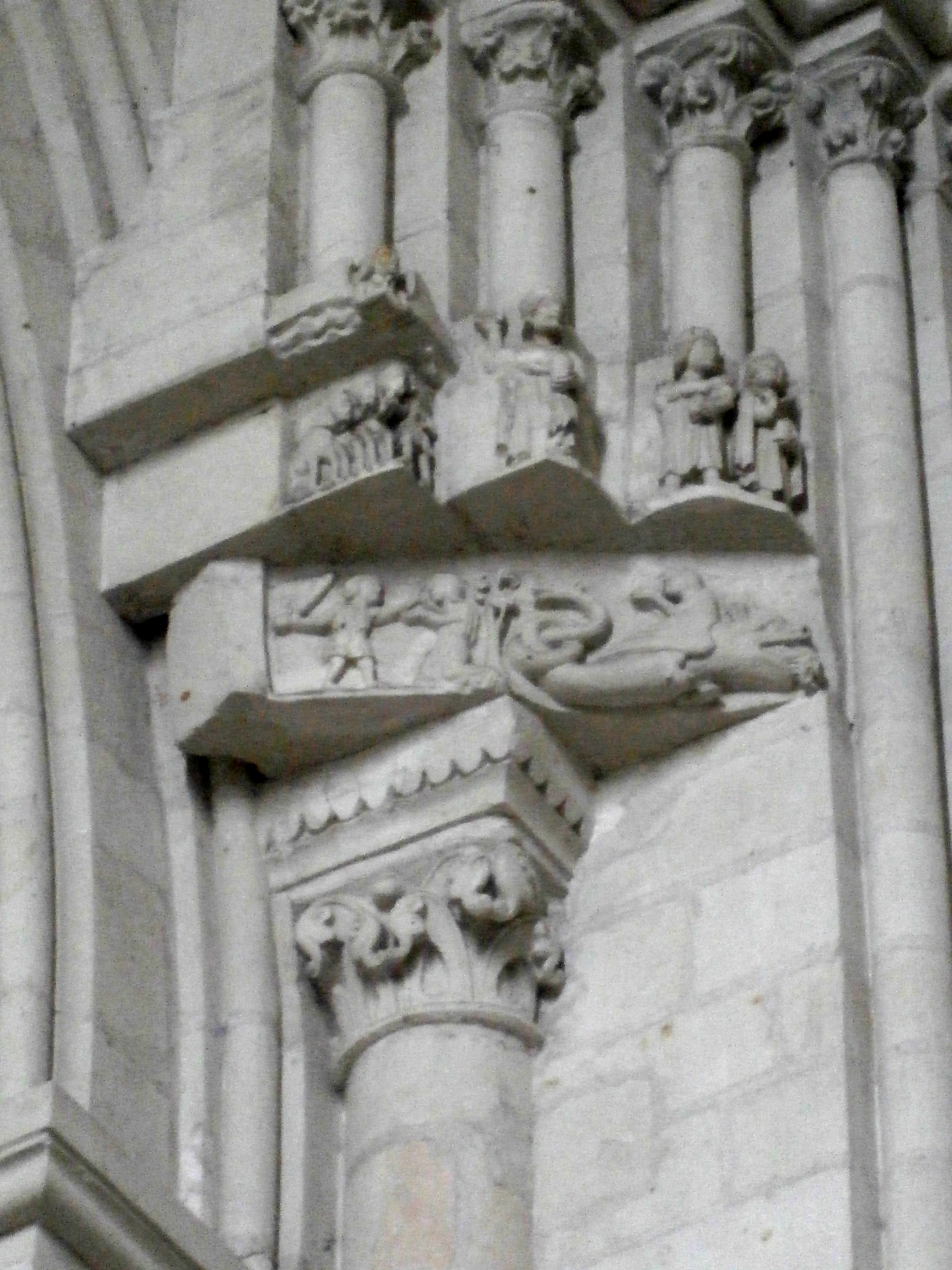
Capital with fantastic decoration (nave-transept connection).

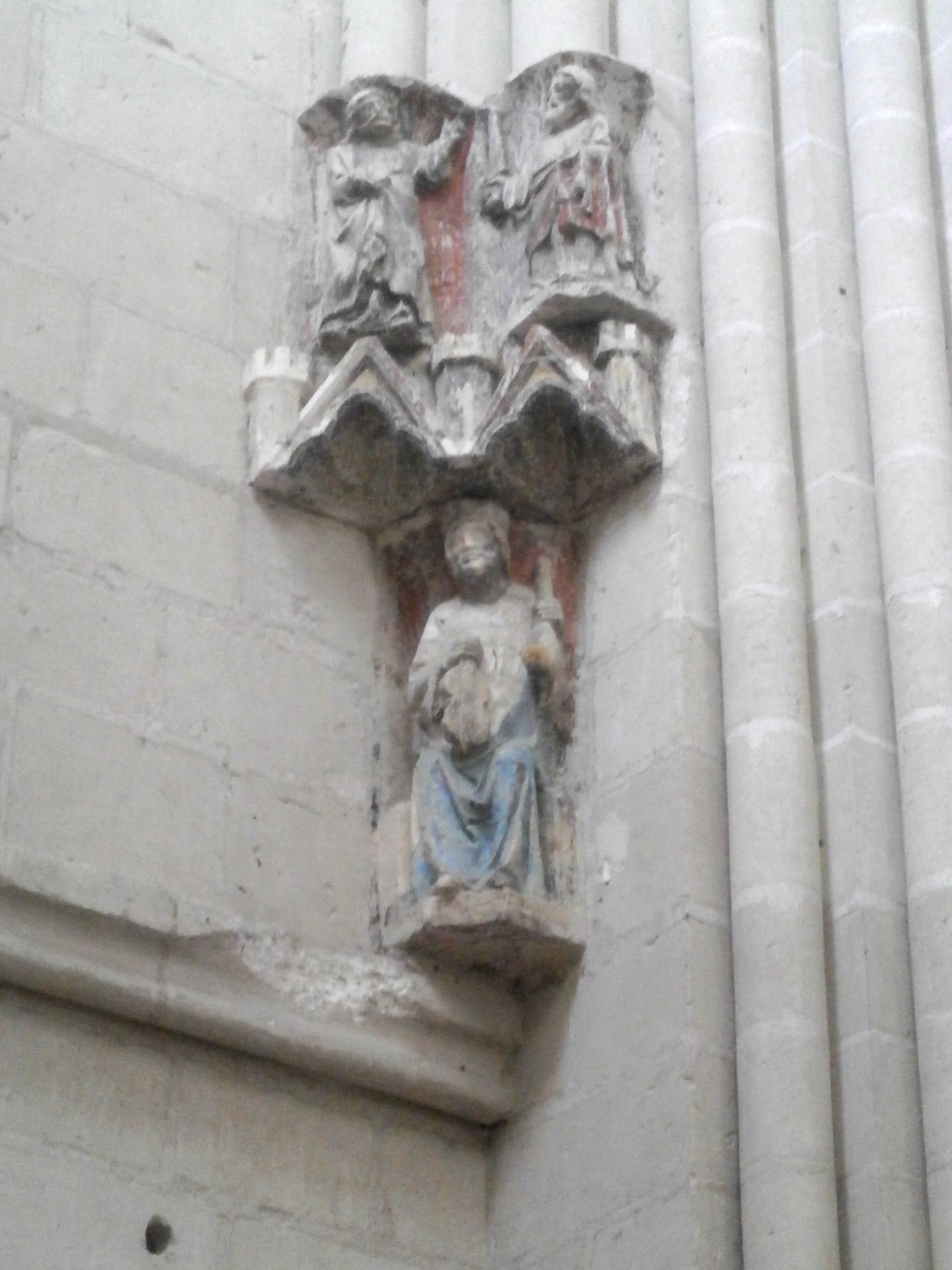
Group of sculptures supporting an arch (nave).

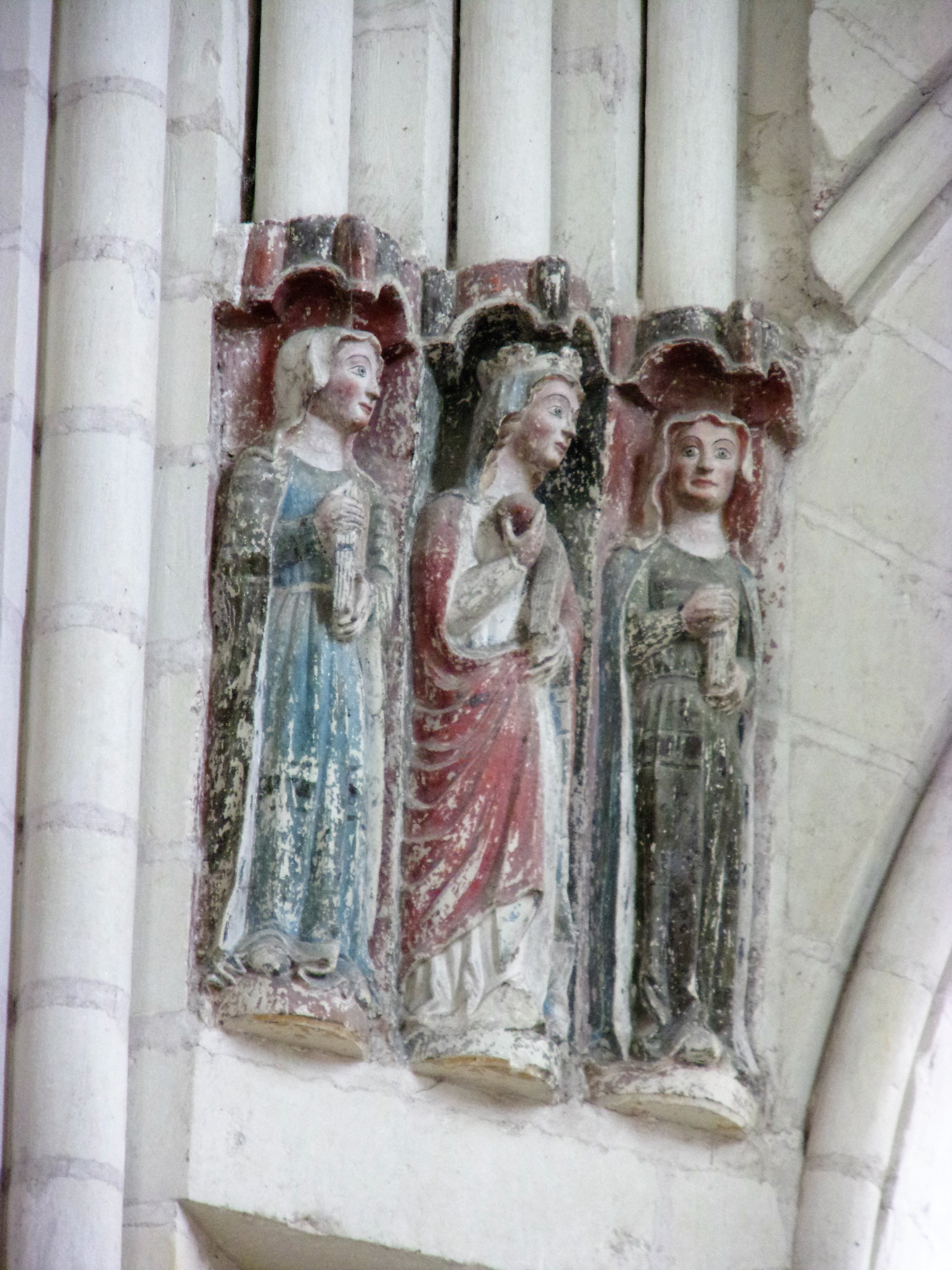
Three female figures (nave).

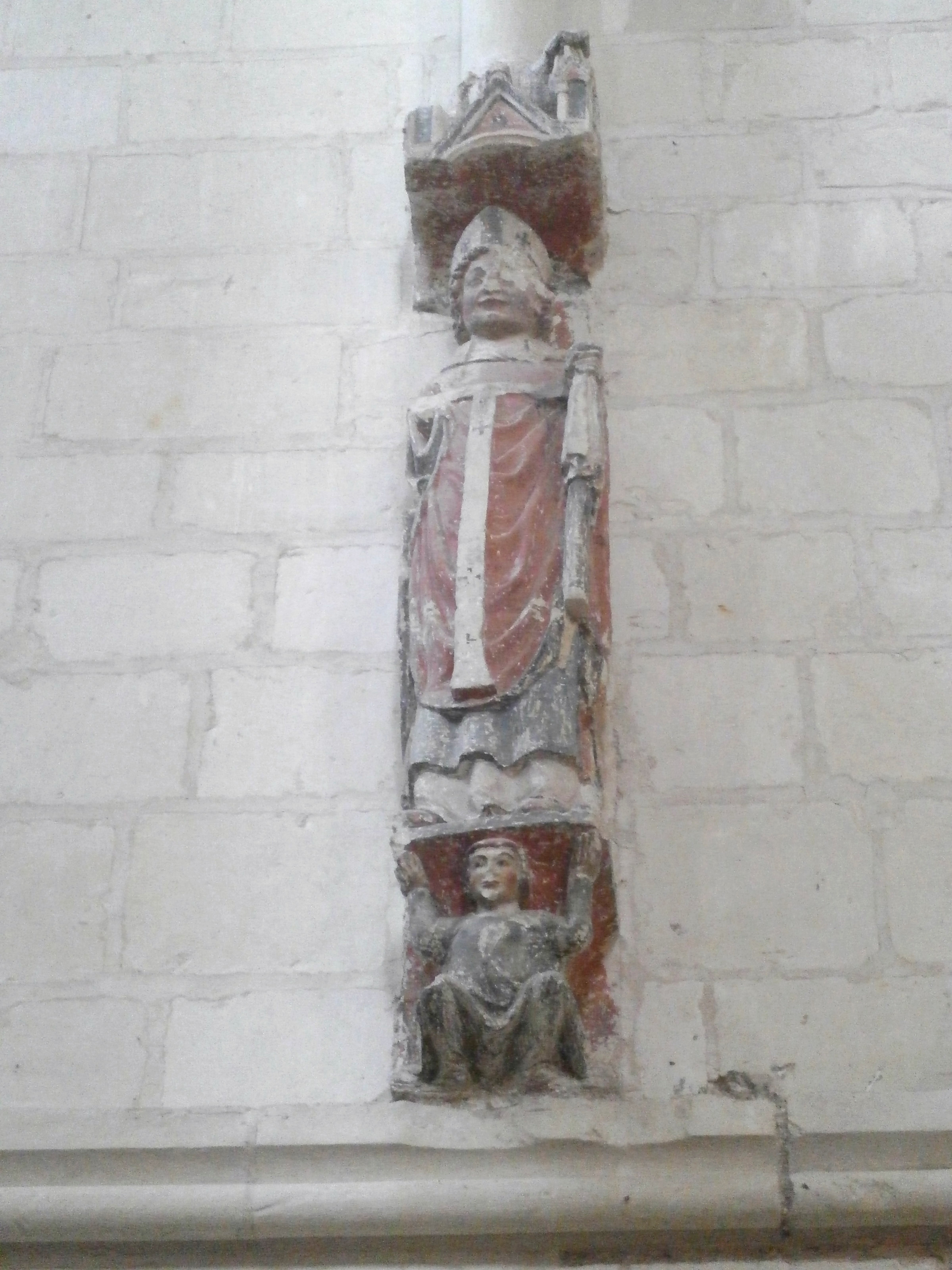
Statue of a bishop, possibly Martin (nave).

==== North porch ====
The north porch of the Collegiate Church of Candes-Saint-Martin features extensive sculptural decoration, including numerous statues (Note: At the Abbey of Saint-Arnould, where part of the tomb of Louis the Pious is preserved—dismantled and scattered during the Revolution—there is a statue, either a Virgin or a Queen of Sheba, dated 1230–1250, embedded in a trumeau, and whose “style and drapery,” as noted by Dorothée Jacoub, present strong similarities with those placed outside the north porch of the collegiate church.) and ornamental motifs, both on its exterior and interior. In a 2002 study on the porch’s iconography, Sara Lutan revived a hypothesis originally proposed by E.-R. Gish, suggesting that some of the statues may represent members of the Plantagenet dynasty, which held significant influence in western France from the mid-12th to the early 13th century. This interpretation is based on the assumption that the porch was constructed at the end of the 12th century or by 1215 at the latest. However, this view is contested. Architectural evidence indicates that the porch was built after part of the nave, as it obstructs one of its bays, placing its construction no earlier than 1225 and likely completed around 1250. (Note: Boissenot 2011, p. 246) Other interpretations, also inconclusive, propose that the statues might depict Merovingian kings.

The sculptural program of the north porch remains unfinished. Several blocks intended for statues were left uncarved, and the vault keystones and tympanum above the inner entrance are also incomplete. Anne Debal-Morche has suggested that one of the tympanum’s figures may represent Saint Martin holding a vial of the relics of Saint Maurice of Agaunum. A group of three faces carved into a capital to the right of the porch—replacing the typical acanthus leaves—has been identified in local oral tradition, recorded in 1945, as representations of Danton, Marat, and Robespierre. According to this account, they were sculpted during the 19th-century restoration works, although this claim lacks documentary evidence.

North porch decoration.

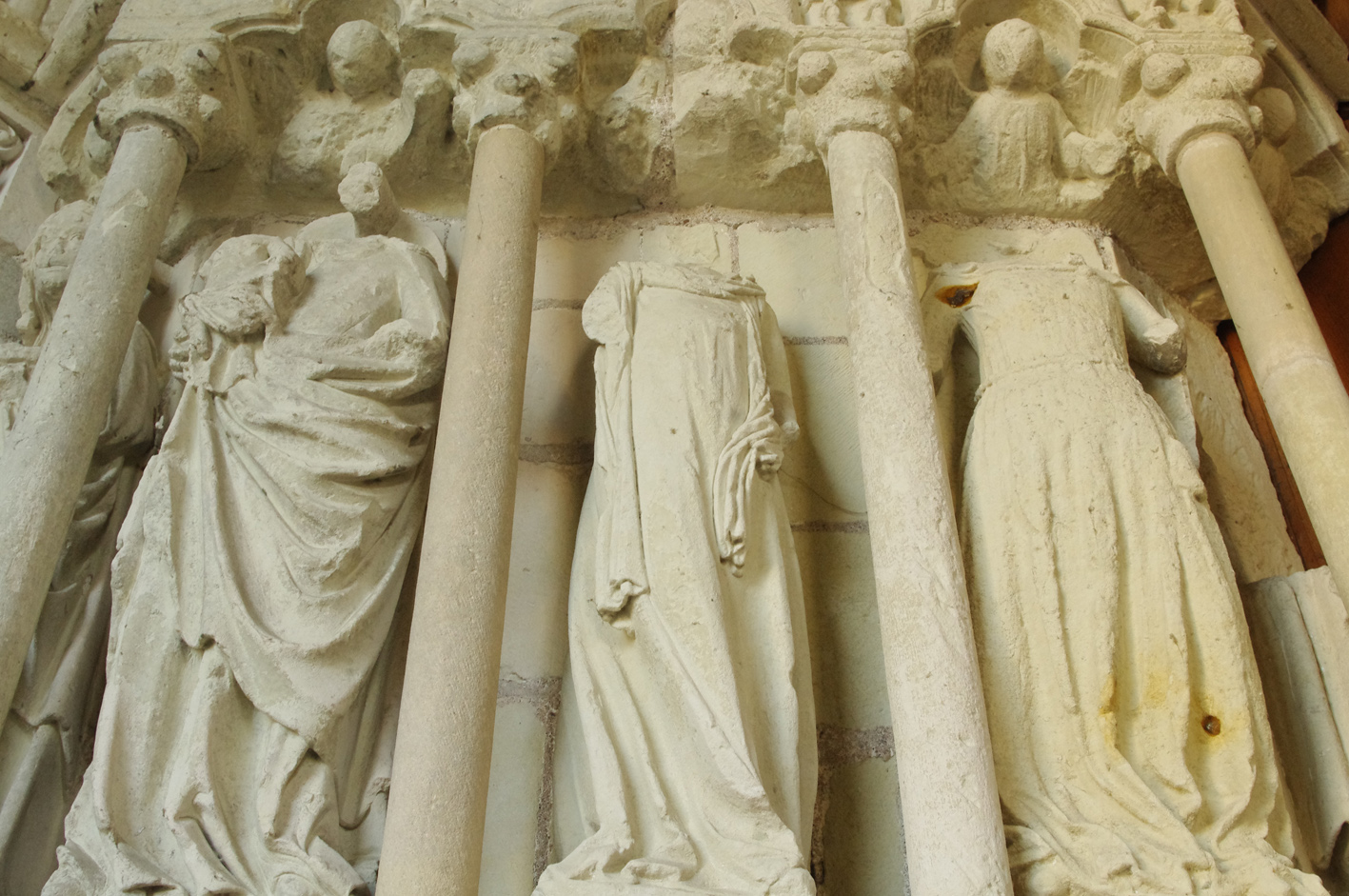
Completed statues (façade).

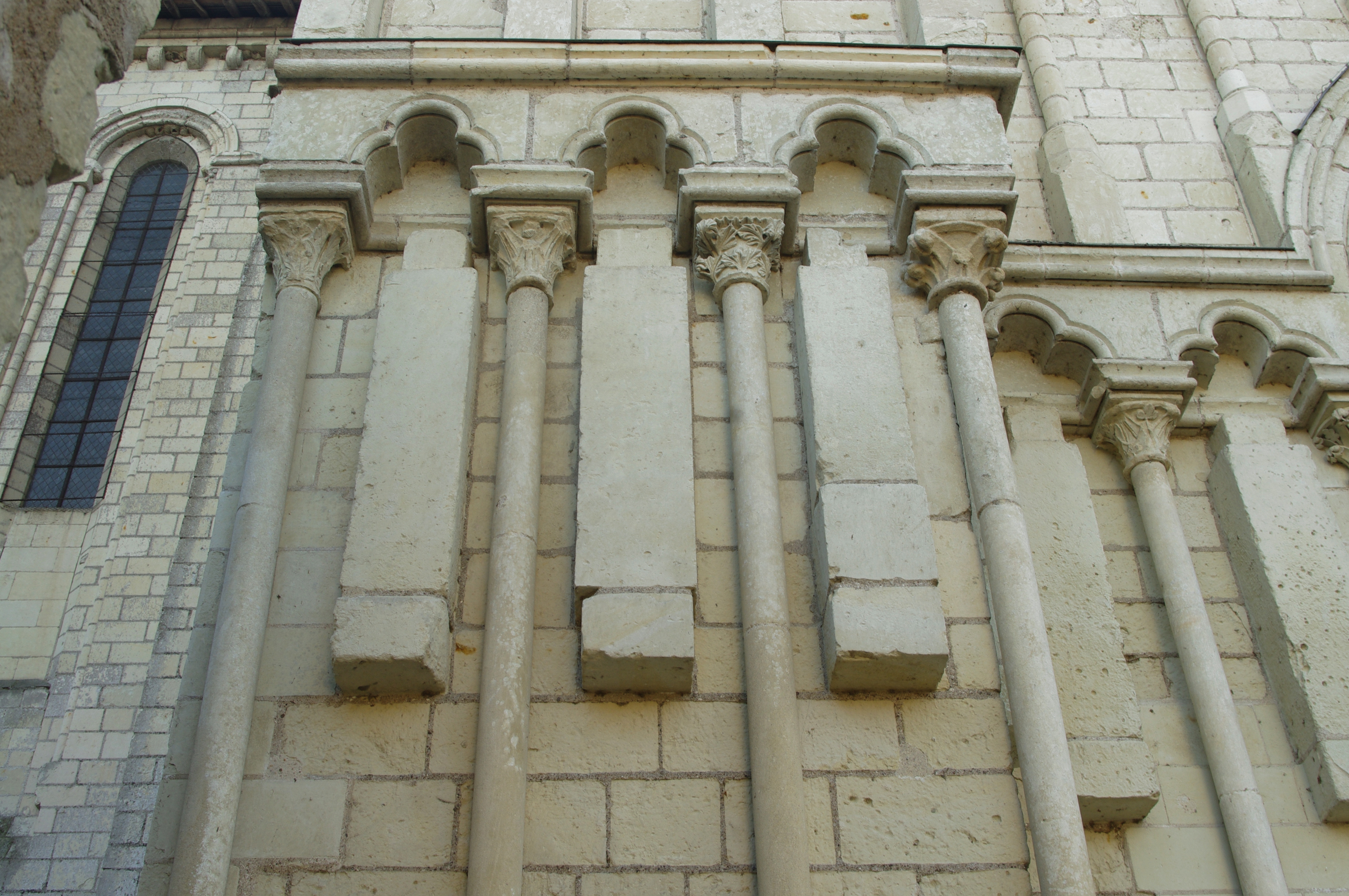
Unfinished statues (façade).

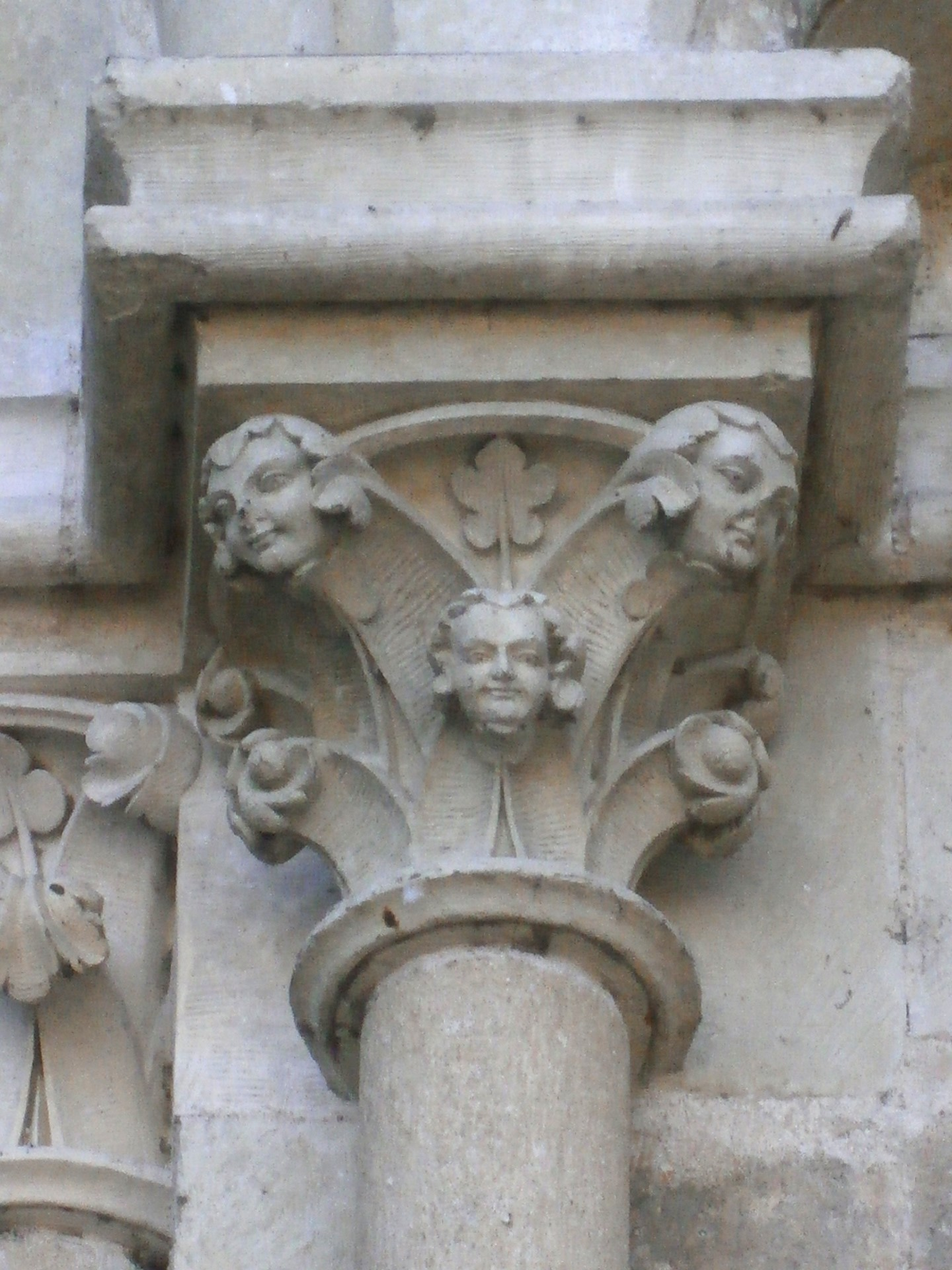
Revolutionary capital (façade).

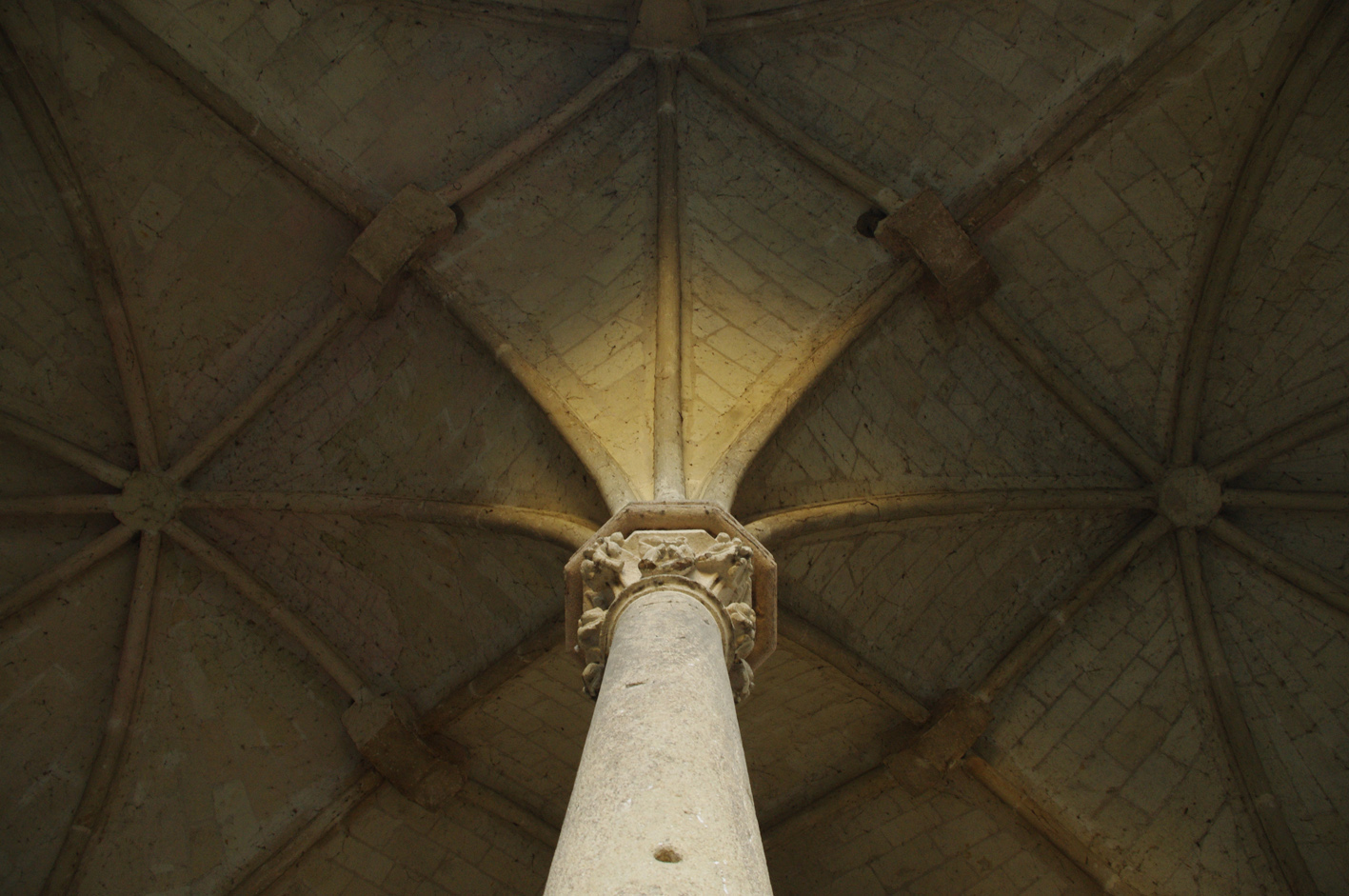
Uncut keystones (interior).

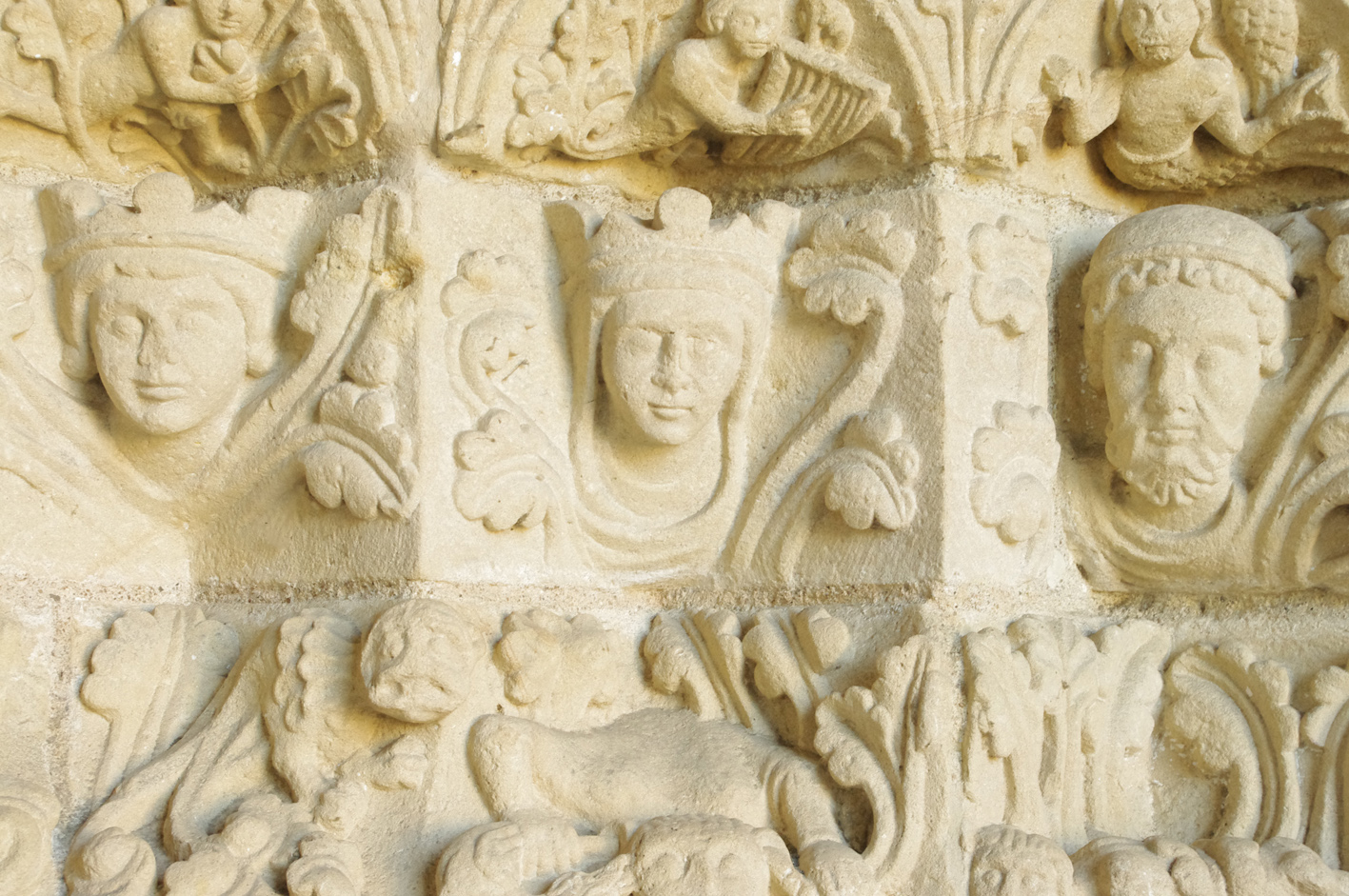
Carved heads (interior).

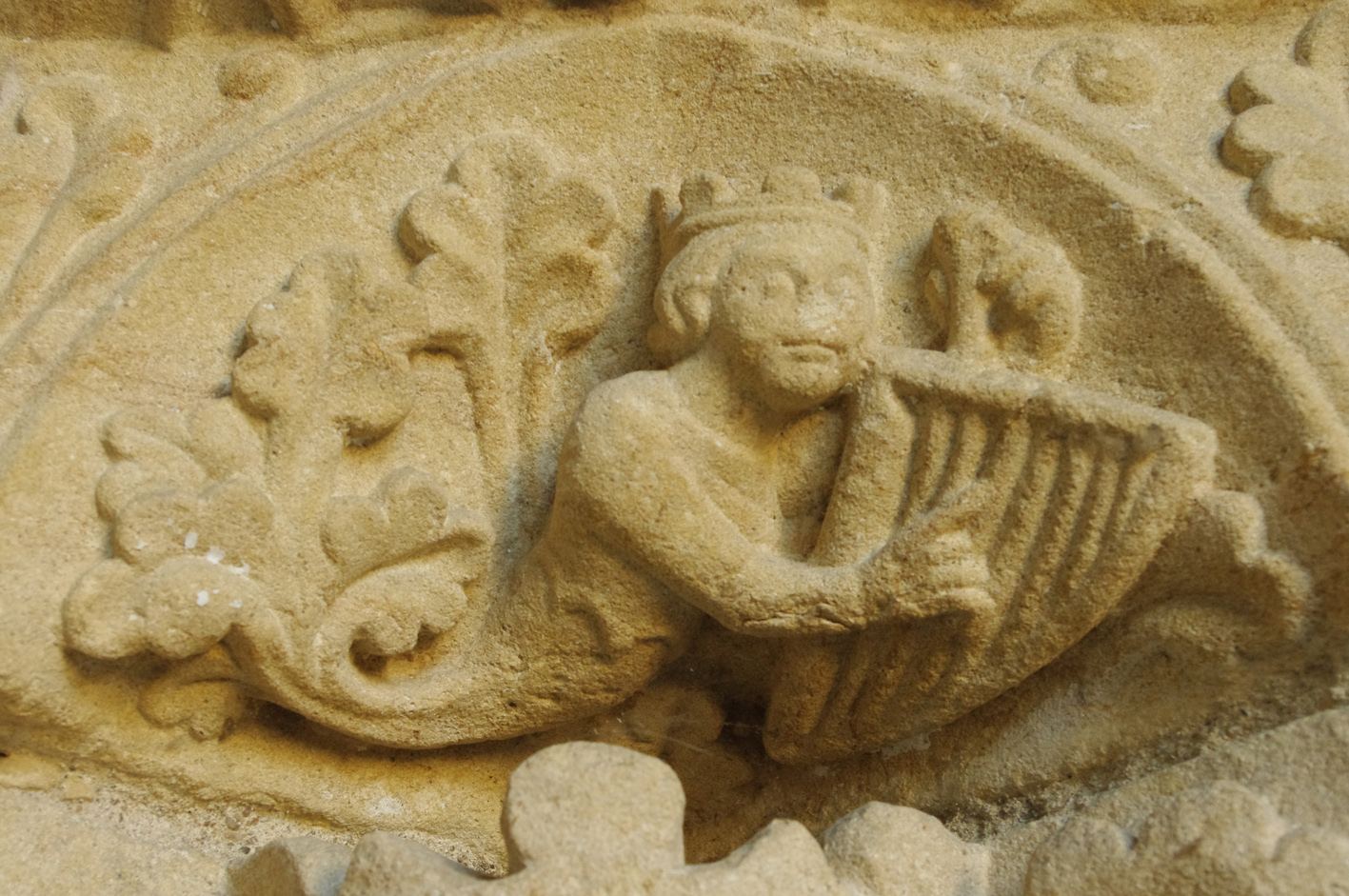
Sculpture of the “musician king” (interior).

=== Furnishings protected as historic monuments ===
Several objects housed in the Collegiate Church of Saint-Martin in Candes-Saint-Martin are listed in the Palissy database as protected under the classification of historic monuments. These include the high altar and its tabernacle, three paintings, a group of three statues, and a bell.

The high altar, dating from the 18th century and clad in black marble, is the only surviving liturgical furnishing from that period. (Note: Lesoing 2016, p. 104) It features a central motif of a dove set against a radiant background. The tabernacle placed on the altar is surmounted by a crucifix and was listed as a historic object in 1994. Originally located at the crossing of the transept and not against the apse, the altar was designed in the so-called “Roman” style. It formerly contained two reliquaries, though the one facing the choir is no longer extant. (Note: Lesoing 2016, pp. 104–105)

The three listed paintings are The Baptism of Christ (16th century, listed in 1990), Saint Paul Struck Down on the Road to Damascus (17th century, listed in 1990), and The Charity of Saint Martin by Antoine Rivoulon (1837, classified in 1995 along with its frame). As of 2017, only The Charity of Saint Martin is publicly displayed, above the entrance to the Saint-Martin Chapel; the other two paintings are kept in the sacristy, which is not open to the public.

A group of three statues from the 17th century, made of terracotta on painted wooden bases, depicts the Crucified Christ flanked by the Virgin Mary and Saint John. These were classified in 1921 and are believed to originate from workshops in the Maine region, possibly associated with the sculptor Gervais Delabarre and his sons. The group was installed at the northern entrance to the nave after 1715. (Note: Lesoing 2016, pp. 105–106)

The church also houses a bronze bell cast in 1728 for the reconstructed bell tower. It was named "Marie-Louise" by Archbishop Louis-Jacques Chapt de Rastignac and Princess Henriette-Louise of Bourbon-Condé. The bell was classified in 1913 and restored in 2013.

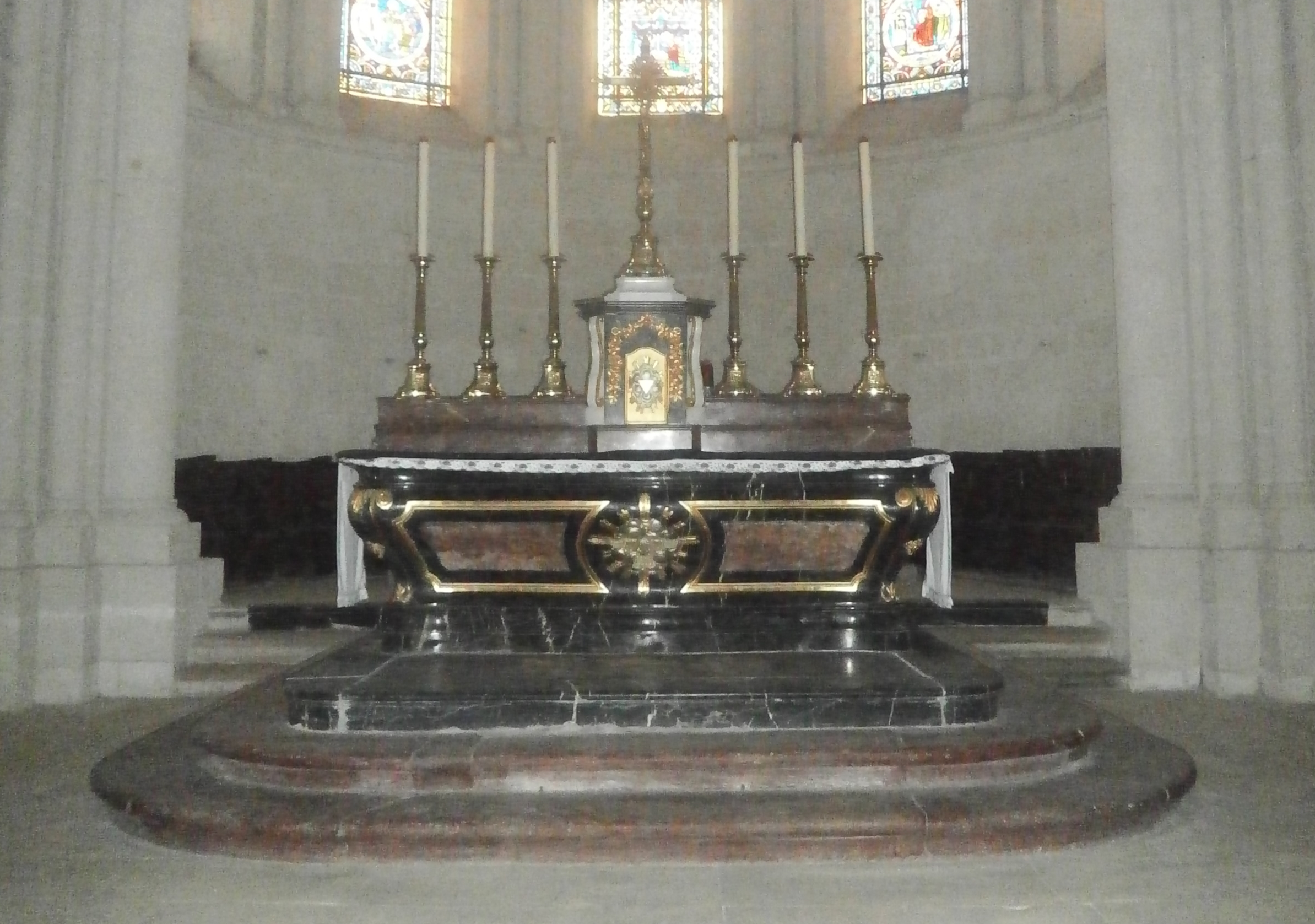
High altar and tabernacle.

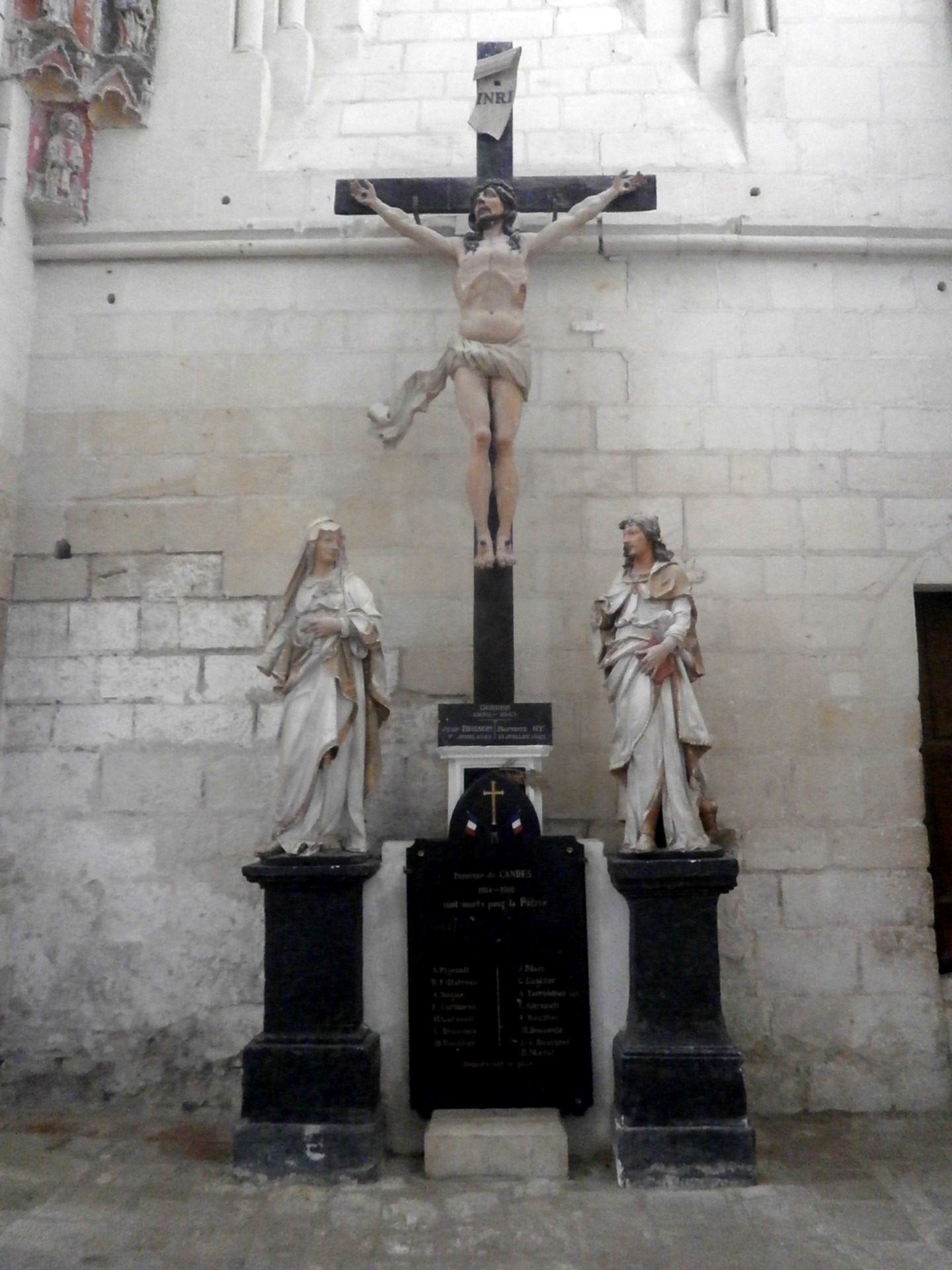
Group of statues.

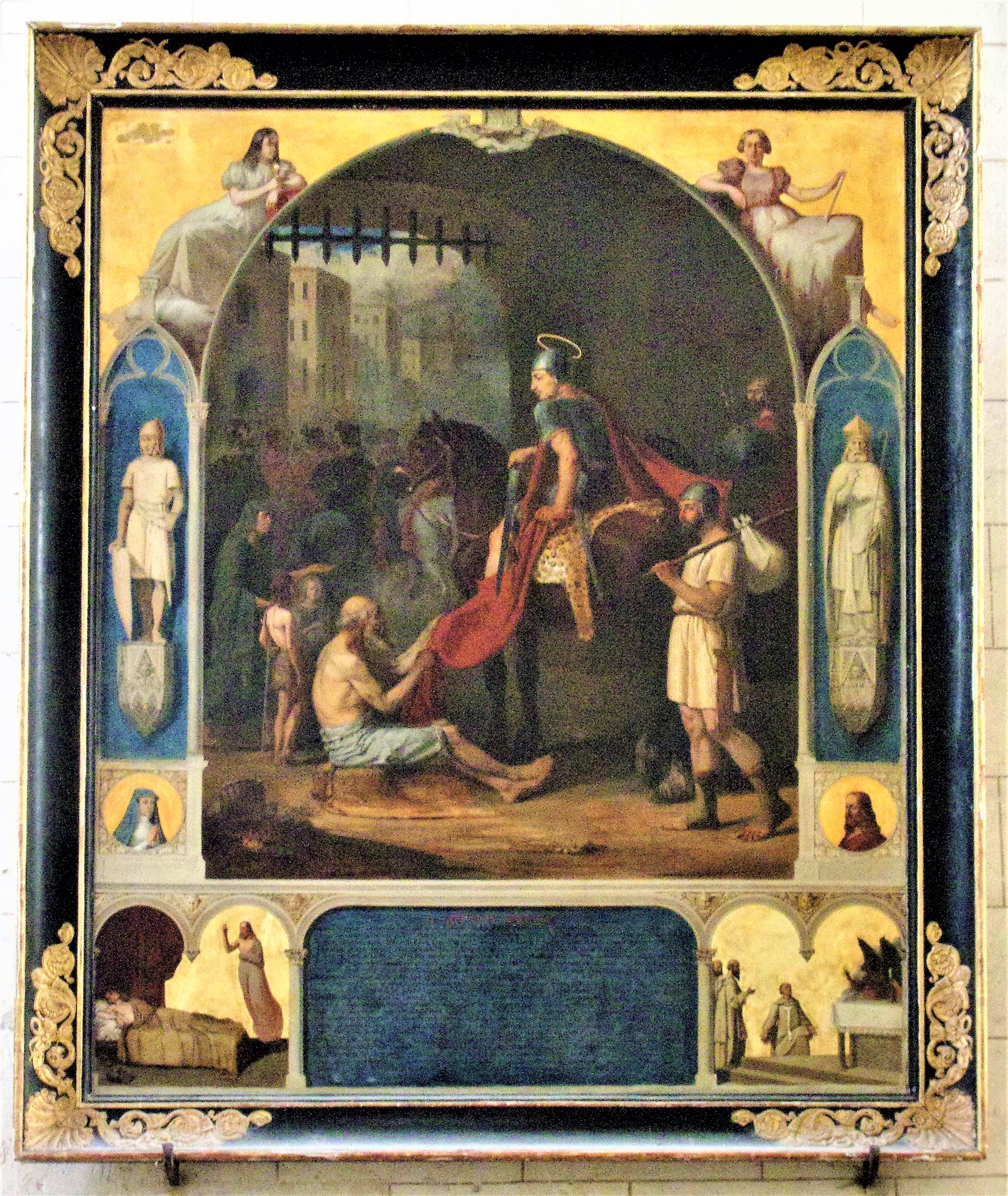
La charité de saint Martin, by Antoine Rivoulon.

== Architectural and historical studies ==
At the end of the 19th or beginning of the 20th century, Abbé Henri Bas authored a summary on the history of Candes, devoting significant attention to the collegiate church. This text is considered the first comprehensive publication on the subject and has been reprinted multiple times.

In 1948, the Congrès archéologique de France was held in Tours. In the proceedings published the following year, André Mussat contributed a detailed article analyzing the decorative elements of the collegiate church and identifying the involvement of several sculptural teams, each led by a distinct “master.”

In 1997, Yves Blomme examined the collegiate church within the context of the “Western Gothic” architectural tradition. His study appeared in the Congrès archéologique de France proceedings titled Monuments en Touraine.

In 2002, Sara Lutan-Hassner completed a doctoral thesis titled The Gothic Sculpture of the Collegiate Church of St. Martin in Candes and the Artistic Traditions of Western France, focusing on the north porch and its iconography. While the thesis was not fully published, its findings were later summarized in several articles.

Claude Boissenot completed a thesis in 2011 titled The Place of the Collegiate Church of Candes-Saint-Martin in Western France. Although it remains unpublished, the work has been cited in various scholarly publications.

The only monograph fully dedicated to the church is La Collégiale de Candes-Saint-Martin (2016) by Bertrand Lesoing. This work synthesizes the current state of knowledge about the building and addresses ongoing questions concerning its history and architecture.

== Heraldry and the arts ==
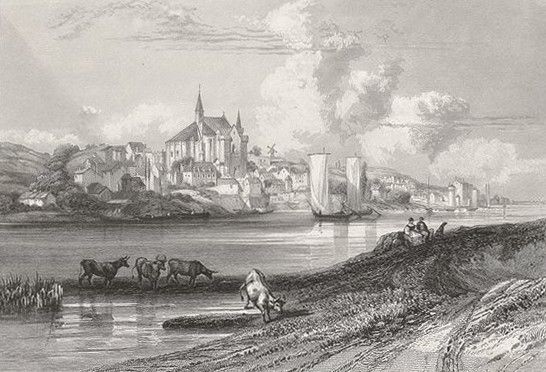
Candes by the Rouargue brothers (1850).

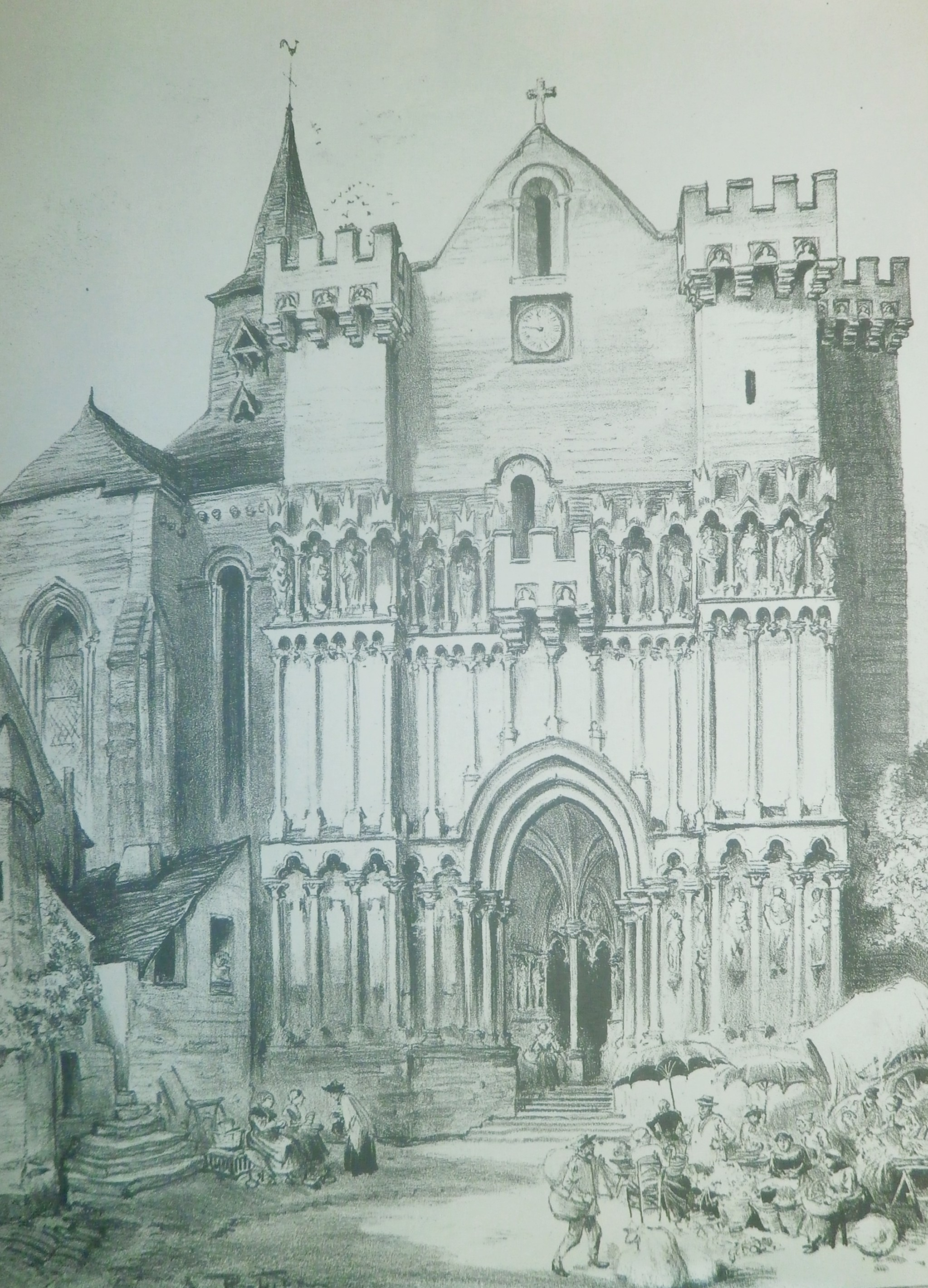
The collegiate church by Albert Robida (1891).

The coat of arms associated with the Collegiate Church of Candes is blazoned: "Azure, a Saint Martin on horseback, followed by the devil in the form of a poor man to whom he gives a cloak, all in gold, with the inscription: SANCTE MARTINE."

During the 19th century, the church was represented by various artists, including painter Paul-Désiré Trouillebert and illustrators such as the Rouargue brothers and Albert Robida. It appeared both as a central subject and within broader landscape compositions. (Note: Gourdin 1997, p. 124)

The Collegiate Church of Candes-Saint-Martin also served as a filming location for scenes in the Franco-Italian film Hardi Pardaillan!, directed by Bernard Borderie and released in 1964.

== See also ==
- List of French historic monuments protected in 1840

== Bibliography ==
=== Publications devoted in whole or in part to Candes-Saint-Martin or its church ===
- Amis de Candes Saint-Martin (1996). Candes-Saint-Martin au cours des âges [Candes-Saint-Martin through the ages] (in French). Chambray-lès-Tours: CLD. ISBN 978-2-854-43254-1.
- Bas, Henri (1921). Candes (in French) (3rd ed.). Tours: édité par l'auteur.
- Blomme, Yves (2003). "La collégiale Saint-Martin de Candes" [The collegiate church of Saint-Martin de Candes]. Congrès archéologique de France. 155e session. Touraine. 1997 [French Archaeological Congress. 155th session. Touraine. 1997] (in French). Paris: Société française d'archéologie. pp. 43–54. ISBN 978-2-36919-096-7.
- Boissenot, Claude (2011). La place de la collégiale de Candes-Saint-Martin dans l'Ouest de la France : thèse de doctorat en Histoire de l'art [The Place of the Collegiate Church of Candes-Saint-Martin in Western France: Doctoral Thesis in Art History] (PDF) (in French). Tours: Université François-Rabelais.
- Carré de Busserolle, Jacques-Xavier (1885). Notice sur la ville et la collégiale de Candes [Notice on the town and collegiate church of Candes] (in French). Tours: Semeur Plaine.
- Gourdin, Pierre (1997). "Candes-Saint-Martin au cours des âges" [Candes-Saint-Martin through the ages]. Mémoire de la Société archéologique de Touraine (in French). LXII: 107–125.
- Lesoing, Bertrand (2016). La collégiale de Candes-Saint-Martin [The collegiate church of Candes-Saint-Martin]. Brumaire (in French). Chinon: Anovi. ISBN 979-1-09638-501-0.
- Lesoing, Bertrand (2019). "La transmission de la mémoire - Candes et Saint Martin entre le IVe et le XIIe siècle" [Passing down memory - Candes and Saint Martin between the 4th and 12th centuries]. Un nouveau Martin - Essor et renouveaux de la figure de Saint Martin, IVe-XXIe siècle [A New Martin - Rise and Renewal of the Figure of Saint Martin, 4th-21st Century]. Perspectives historiques (in French). Tours: Presses universitaires François-Rabelais. pp. 109–119.
- Lutan, Sara (2002). "Le porche septentrional de la collégiale Saint-Martin de Candes (v. 1180) et l'image dynastique des Plantagenêt" [The northern porch of the collegiate church of Saint-Martin de Candes (c. 1180) and the dynastic image of the Plantagenets]. Cahiers de civilisation médiévale (in French). 45 (170): 341–361. doi:10.3406/ccmed.2002.2840.
- Mussat, André (1964). "Candes". Congrès archéologique de France. 122e session. Anjou. 1964 [French Archaeological Congress. 122nd session. Anjou. 1964] (in French). Paris: Société française d'archéologie. pp. 499–516.
- Savette, P.-A (1935). Candes, notice historique [Candes, historical note] (in French). Saumur: Roland.

=== Publications on Touraine's religious architecture and heritage ===
- Couderc, Jean-Mary (1987). Dictionnaire des communes de Touraine [Dictionary of the communes of Touraine] (in French). Chambray-lès-Tours: C.L.D. ISBN 2-85443-136-7.
- Flohic, Jean-Luc (2001). Patrimoine des communes de France [France's local heritage] (in French). Vol. 1. Flohic. p. 443. ISBN 2-84234-115-5.
- Mussat, André (1963). Le style gothique de l'ouest de la France (XIIe et XIIIe siècles) [Gothic style in western France (12th and 13th centuries)] (in French). Paris: A. & J. Picard et Cie.
- Ranjard, Robert (1986). La Touraine archéologique : guide du touriste en Indre-et-Loire [La Touraine archéologique: a tourist's guide to Indre-et-Loire] (in French) (3rd ed.). Mayenne: Manutention. ISBN 2-855-54017-8.
