= Roman magistrate =

Elected official in ancient Rome

The Roman magistrates (Latin: magistratus) were elected officials in ancient Rome. During the period of the Roman Kingdom, the King of Rome was the principal executive magistrate. His power, in practice, was absolute. He was the chief priest, lawgiver, judge, and the sole commander of the army. When the king died, his power reverted to the Roman Senate, which then chose an Interrex to facilitate the election of a new king.

During the transition from the Roman Kingdom to Roman Republic, the constitutional balance of power shifted from the executive (the Roman king) to the Roman Senate. When the Roman Republic was founded in 509 BC, the powers that had been held by the king were transferred to the Roman consuls, of which two were to be elected each year. Magistrates of the republic were elected by the people of Rome, and were each vested with a degree of power called "major powers" (maior potestas). Dictators had more "major powers" than any other magistrate, and after the dictator was the censor, and then the consul, and then the praetor, and then the curule aedile, and then the quaestor. Any magistrate could obstruct ("veto") an action that was being taken by a magistrate with an equal or lower degree of magisterial powers. By definition, plebeian tribunes and plebeian aediles were technically not magistrates since they were elected only by the plebeians, and plebeian tribunes could veto the actions of any ordinary magistrate.

During the transition from republic to the Roman empire, the constitutional balance of power shifted from the Roman Senate back to the executive (the Roman Emperor). Theoretically, the senate elected each new emperor; in practice each emperor chose his own successor, though the choice was often overruled by the army or civil war. The powers of an emperor (his imperium) existed, in theory at least, by virtue of his legal standing. The two most significant components to an emperor's imperium were the "tribunician powers" and the "proconsular powers". In theory at least, the tribunician powers (which were similar to those of the plebeian tribunes under the old republic) gave the emperor authority over Rome's civil government, while the proconsular powers (similar to those of military governors, or proconsuls, under the old republic) gave him authority over the Roman army. While these distinctions were clearly defined during the early empire, eventually they were lost, and the emperor's powers became less constitutional and more monarchical. The traditional magistracies that survived the fall of the republic were the consulship, praetorship, plebeian tribunate, aedileship, quaestorship, and military tribunate. Mark Antony abolished the offices of dictator and Master of the Horse during his consulship in 44 BC, while the offices of Interrex and Roman censor were abolished shortly thereafter.

== Executive magistrates of the Roman Kingdom ==
The executive magistrates of the Roman Kingdom were elected officials of the ancient Roman Kingdom. During the period of the Roman Kingdom, the Roman King was the principal executive magistrate. He was the chief executive, chief priest, chief lawgiver, chief judge, and the sole commander-in-chief of the army. His powers rested on law and legal precedent, and he could only receive these powers through the political process of an election. In practice, he had no real restrictions on his power. When war broke out, he had the sole power to organize and levy troops, to select leaders for the army, and to conduct the campaign as he saw fit. He controlled all property held by the state, had the sole power to divide land and war spoils, was the chief representative of the city during dealings with either the Gods or leaders of other communities, and could unilaterally decree any new law. Sometimes he submitted his decrees to either the popular assembly or to the senate for a ceremonial ratification, but a rejection did not prevent the enactment of a decree. The king chose several officers to assist him, and unilaterally granted them their powers. When the king left the city, an Urban Prefect presided over the city in place of the absent king. The king also had two Quaestors as general assistants, while several other officers assisted the king during treason cases. In war, the king occasionally commanded only the infantry, and delegated command over the cavalry to the commander of his personal bodyguards, the Tribune of the Celeres. The king sometimes deferred to precedent, often simply out of practical necessity. While the king could unilaterally declare war, for example, he typically wanted to have such declarations ratified by the popular assembly.

The period between the death of a king, and the election of a new king, was known as the interregnum. During the interregnum, the senate elected a senator to the office of Interrex to facilitate the election of a new king. Once the Interrex found a suitable nominee for the kingship, he presented this nominee to the senate for an initial approval. If the senate voted in favor of the nominee, that person stood for formal election before the People of Rome in the Curiate Assembly (the popular assembly). After the nominee was elected by the popular assembly, the senate ratified the election by passing a decree. The Interrex then formally declared the nominee to be king. The new king then took the auspices (a ritual search for omens from the Gods), and was vested with legal authority (imperium) by the popular assembly.

== Executive magistrates of the Roman Republic ==
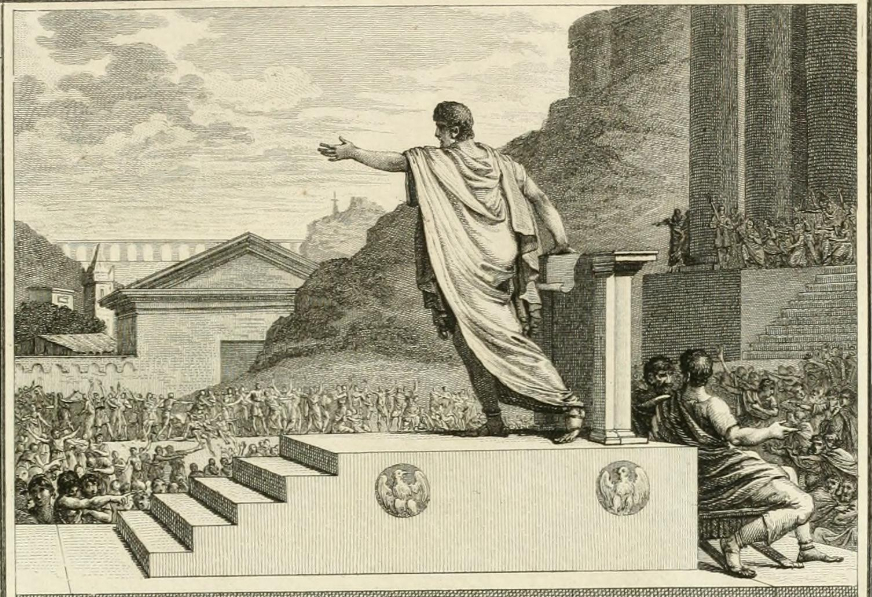
Gaius Gracchus, tribune of the people, presiding over the Plebeian Council

The Roman magistrates were elected officials of the Roman Republic. Each Roman magistrate was vested with a degree of power. Dictators (a temporary position for emergencies) had the highest level of power. After the Dictator was the Consul (the highest position if not an emergency), and then the Praetor, and then the Censor, and then the curule aedile, and finally the quaestor. Each magistrate could only veto an action that was taken by a magistrate with an equal or lower degree of power. Since plebeian tribunes (as well as plebeian aediles) were technically not magistrates, they relied on the sacrosanct of their person to obstruct. If one did not comply with the orders of a Plebeian Tribune, the Tribune could interpose the sacrosanctity of his person (intercessio) to physically stop that particular action. Any resistance against the tribune was considered to be a capital offense.

The most significant constitutional power that a magistrate could hold was that of "Command" (Imperium), which was held only by consuls and praetors. This gave a magistrate the constitutional authority to issue commands (military or otherwise). Once a magistrate's annual term in office expired, he had to wait ten years before serving in that office again. Since this did create problems for some magistrates, these magistrates occasionally had their command powers extended, which, in effect, allowed them to retain the powers of their office as a promagistrate.

The consul of the Roman Republic was the highest ranking ordinary magistrate. Two Consuls were elected every year, and they had supreme power in both civil and military matters. Throughout the year, one Consul was superior in rank to the other Consul, and this ranking flipped every month, between the two Consuls. Praetors administered civil law, presided over the courts, and commanded provincial armies. Another magistrate, the Censor, conducted a census, during which time they could appoint people to the senate. Aediles were officers elected to conduct domestic affairs in Rome, and were vested with powers over the markets, and over public games and shows. Quaestors usually assisted the consuls in Rome, and the governors in the provinces with financial tasks. Though they technically were not magistrates, the Plebeian Tribunes and the Plebeian Aediles were considered to be the representatives of the people. Thus, they acted as a popular check over the senate (through their veto powers), and safeguarded the civil liberties of all Roman citizens.

In times of military emergency, a Roman Dictator was appointed for a term of six months. Constitutional government dissolved, and the Dictator became the absolute master of the state. The Dictator then appointed a Master of the Horse to serve as his most senior lieutenant. Often the Dictator resigned his office as soon as the matter that caused his appointment was resolved. When the Dictator's term ended, constitutional government was restored. The last ordinary Dictator was appointed in 202 BC. After 202 BC, extreme emergencies were addressed through the passage of the decree senatus consultum ultimum ("ultimate decree of the senate"). This suspended civil government, declared martial law, and vested the consuls with Dictatorial powers.

== Executive magistrates of the Roman Empire ==
The executive magistrates of the Roman Empire were elected individuals of the ancient Roman Empire. The powers of an emperor (his imperium) existed, in theory at least, by virtue of his legal standing. The two most significant components to an emperor's imperium were the "tribunician powers" (potestas tribunicia) and the "proconsular powers" (imperium proconsulare). In theory at least, the tribunician powers (which were similar to those of the plebeian tribunes under the old republic) gave the emperor authority over Rome's civil government, while the proconsular powers (similar to those of military governors, or Proconsuls, under the old republic) gave him authority over the Roman army. While these distinctions were clearly defined during the early empire, eventually they were lost, and the emperor's powers became less constitutional and more monarchical.

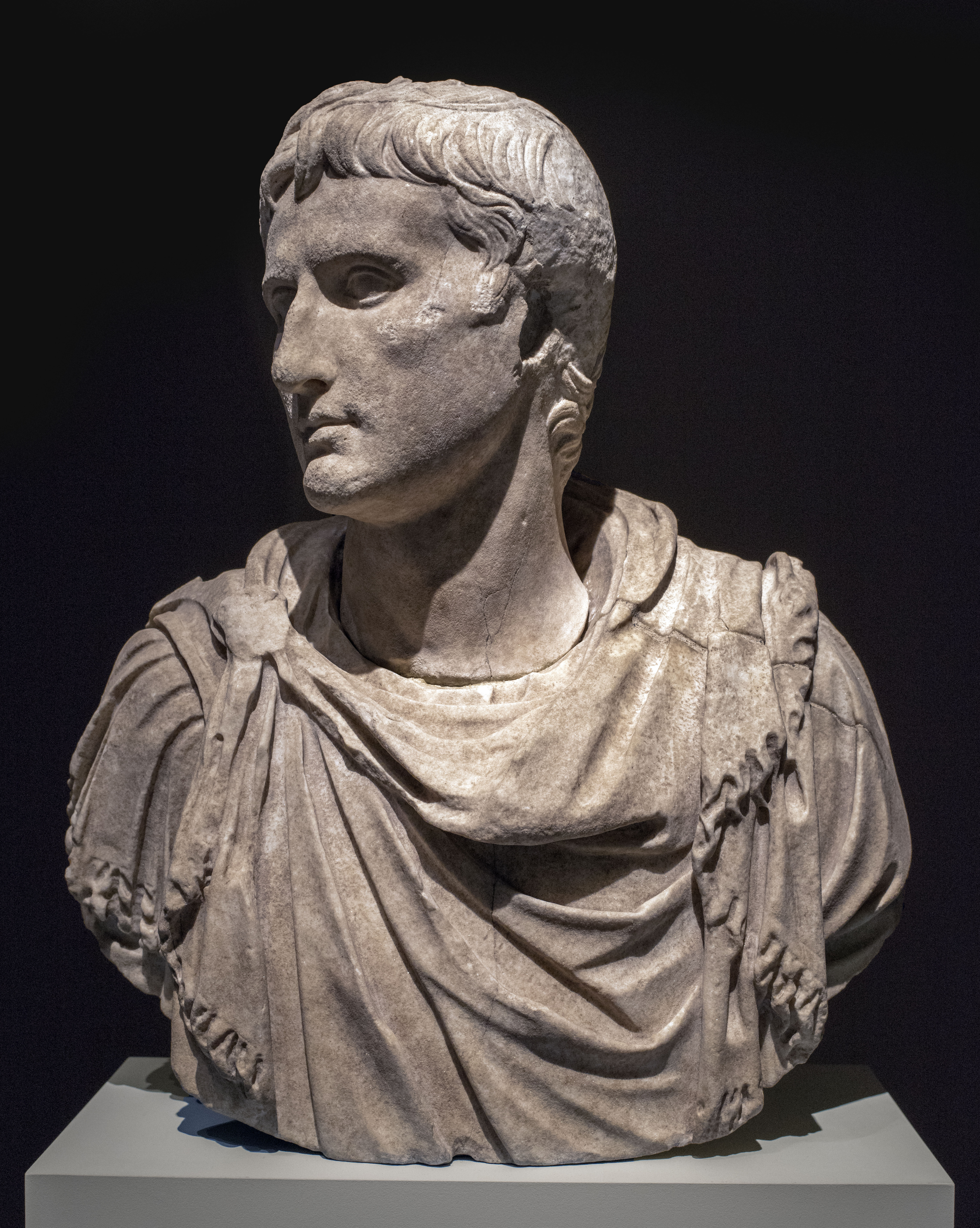
Augustus, the first Roman emperor

By virtue of his proconsular powers, the emperor held the same grade of military command authority as did the chief magistrates (the Roman consuls and proconsuls) under the republic. However, the emperor was not subject to the constitutional restrictions that the old consuls and proconsuls had been subject to. Eventually, he was given powers that, under the republic, had been reserved for the Roman Senate and the Roman assemblies including the right to declare war, to ratify treaties, and to negotiate with foreign leaders. The emperor's degree of Proconsular power gave him authority over all of Rome's military governors, and thus, over most of the Roman army. The emperor's tribunician powers gave him power over Rome's civil apparatus, as well as the power to preside over, and thus to dominate, the assemblies and the senate. When an emperor was vested with the tribunician powers, his office and his person became sacrosanct, and thus it became a capital offense to harm or to obstruct the emperor. The emperor also had the authority to carry out a range of duties that, under the republic, had been performed by the Roman censors. Such duties included the authority to regulate public morality (Censorship) and to conduct a census. As part of the census, the emperor had the power to assign individuals to a new social class, including the senatorial class, which gave the emperor unchallenged control over senate membership. The emperor also had the power to interpret laws and to set precedents. In addition, the emperor controlled the religious institutions, since, as emperor, he was always Pontifex Maximus, and a member of each of the four major priesthoods.

Under the empire, the citizens were divided into three classes, and for members of each class, a distinct career path was available (known as the cursus honorum). The traditional magistracies were only available to citizens of the senatorial class. The magistracies that survived the fall of the republic were (by their order of rank per the cursus honorum) the consulship, praetorship, plebeian tribunate, aedileship, quaestorship, and military tribunate. If an individual was not of the senatorial class, he could run for one of these offices if he was allowed to run by the emperor, or otherwise, he could be appointed to one of these offices by the emperor. During the transition from republic to empire, no office lost more power or prestige than the consulship, which was due, in part, to the fact that the substantive powers of republican Consuls were all transferred to the emperor. Imperial Consuls could preside over the senate, could act as judges in certain criminal trials, and had control over public games and shows. The Praetors also lost a great deal of power, and ultimately had little authority outside of the city. The chief Praetor in Rome, the urban praetor, outranked all other Praetors, and for a brief time, they were given power over the treasury. Under the empire, the plebeian tribunes remained sacrosanct, and, in theory at least, retained the power to summon, or to veto, the senate and the assemblies. Augustus divided the college of Quaestors into two divisions, and assigned one division the task of serving in the senatorial provinces, and the other the task of managing civil administration in Rome. Under Augustus, the Aediles lost control over the grain supply to a board of commissioners. It was not until after they lost the power to maintain order in the city, however, that they truly became powerless, and the office disappeared entirely during the 3rd century.

== See also ==
- Ancient Rome
- Roman Empire
- Roman law
- Plebeian Council
- Centuria
- Curia
- Praetor
- Aedile
- Cursus honorum
- Byzantine Senate
- Princeps senatus
- Procurator (Roman)
- Acta Senatus
