= Executive magistrates of the Roman Republic =

Officials of the ancient Roman Republic

The executive magistrates of the Roman Republic were officials of the ancient Roman Republic (c. 510 BC – 44 BC), elected by the People of Rome. Ordinary magistrates (magistratus) were divided into several ranks according to their role and the power they wielded: censors, consuls (who functioned as the regular head of state), praetors, curule aediles, and finally quaestor. Any magistrate could obstruct (veto) an action that was being taken by a magistrate with an equal or lower degree of magisterial powers. By definition, plebeian tribunes and plebeian aediles were technically not magistrates as they were elected only by the plebeians, but no ordinary magistrate could veto any of their actions. Dictator was an extraordinary magistrate normally elected in times of emergency (usually military) for a short period. During this period, the dictator's power over the Roman government was absolute, as they were not checked by any institution or magistrate.

== Ranks ==
The magistrates (magistratus) were elected by the People of Rome, which consisted of plebeians (commoners) and patricians (aristocrats). Each magistrate was vested with a degree of power, called "major powers" or maior potestas. Dictators had more "major powers" than any other magistrate, and thus they outranked all other magistrates; but were originally intended only to be a temporary tool for times of state emergency. Thereafter in descending order came the censor (who, while the highest-ranking ordinary magistrate by virtue of his prestige, held little real power), the consul, the praetor, the curule aedile, and the quaestor. Any magistrate could obstruct (veto) an action that was being taken by a magistrate with an equal or lower degree of magisterial powers. If this obstruction occurred between two magistrates of equal rank, such as two praetors, then it was called par potestas (negation of powers). To prevent this, magistrates used a principle of alteration, assigned responsibilities by lot or seniority, or gave certain magistrates control over certain functions. If this obstruction occurred against a magistrate of a lower rank, then it was called intercessio, where the magistrate literally interposed his higher rank to obstruct the lower-ranking magistrate. By definition, plebeian tribunes and plebeian aediles were technically not magistrates since they were elected only by the plebeians. As such, no ordinary magistrate could veto any of their actions.

== Powers ==
Only Roman citizens (both plebeians and patricians) had the right to confer magisterial powers (potestas) on any individual magistrate. The most important power was imperium, which was held by consuls (the chief magistrates) and by praetors (the second highest-ranking ordinary magistrate). Defined narrowly, imperium simply gave a magistrate the authority to command a military force. Defined more broadly, however, imperium gave a magistrate the constitutional authority to issue commands (military, diplomatic, civil, or otherwise). A magistrate's imperium was at its apex while the magistrate was abroad. While the magistrate was in the city of Rome itself, however, he had to completely surrender his imperium, so that liberty (libertas) was maximized. Magistrates with imperium sat in a curule chair, and were attended by lictors (bodyguards) who carried axes called fasces which symbolized the power of the state to punish and to execute. Only a magistrate with imperium could wear a bordered toga, or be awarded a triumph.

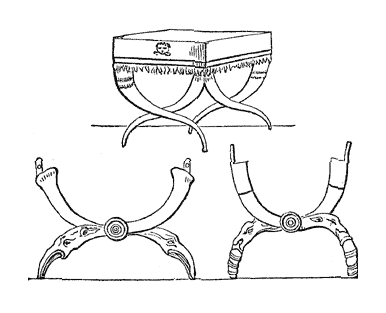
The curule chair was a symbol of the power of high-ranking magistrates

All magistrates had the power of coercion (coercitio), which was used by magistrates to maintain public order. A magistrate had many ways with which to enforce this power. Examples include flogging, imprisonment, fines, mandating pledges and oaths, enslavement, banishment, and sometimes even the destruction of a person's house. While in Rome, all citizens had an absolute protection against Coercion. This protection was called "Provocatio" (see below), which allowed any citizen to appeal any punishment. However, the power of Coercion outside the city of Rome was absolute. Magistrates also had both the power and the duty to look for omens from the Gods (auspicia), which could be used to obstruct political opponents. By claiming to witness an omen, a magistrate could justify the decision to end a legislative or senate meeting, or the decision to veto a colleague. While the magistrates had access to oracular documents, the Sibylline books, they rarely consulted with these books, and even then, only after seeing an omen. All senior magistrates (consuls, praetors, censors, and plebeian tribunes) were required to actively look for omens (auspicia impetrativa); simply having omens thrust upon them (auspicia oblativa) was generally not adequate. Omens could be discovered while observing the heavens, while studying the flight of birds, or while studying the entrails of sacrificed animals. When a magistrate believed that he had witnessed such an omen, he usually had a priest (augur) interpret the omen. A magistrate was required to look for omens while presiding over a legislative or senate meeting, and while preparing for a war.

One check over a magistrate's power was collegiality (collega), which required that each magisterial office be held concurrently by at least two people. For example, two consuls always served together. The check on the magistrate's power of Coercion was Provocatio, which was an early form of due process (habeas corpus). Any Roman citizen had the absolute right to appeal any ruling by a magistrate to a plebeian tribune. In this case, the citizen would cry "provoco ad populum", which required the magistrate to wait for a tribune to intervene, and make a ruling. Sometimes, the case was brought before the College of tribunes, and sometimes before the Plebeian Council (popular assembly). Since no tribune could retain his powers outside of the city of Rome, the power of Coercion here was absolute. An additional check over a magistrate's power was that of Provincia, which required a division of responsibilities.

Once a magistrate's annual term in office expired, he had to wait ten years before serving in that office again. Since this did create problems for some magistrates (in particular, consuls and praetors), these magistrates occasionally had their imperium "prorogued" (prorogare), which allowed them to retain the powers of the office as a Promagistrate. The result was that private citizens ended up with consular and praetorian imperium, without actually holding either office. Often, they used this power to act as provincial governors.

== Ordinary magistrates ==
The consul of the Roman Republic was the highest-ranking ordinary magistrate. Two consuls were elected for an annual term (from January through December) by the assembly of Roman citizens, the Centuriate Assembly. After they were elected, they were granted imperium powers by the assembly. If a consul died before his term ended, another consul (the consul suffectus), was elected to complete the original consular term. Throughout the year, one consul was superior in rank to the other consul. This ranking flipped every month, between the two consuls. Once a consul's term ended, he held the honorary title of consulare for the rest of his time in the senate, and had to wait for ten years before standing for re-election to the consulship. Consuls had supreme power in both civil and military matters, which was due, in part, to the fact that they held the highest ordinary grade of imperium (command) powers. While in the city of Rome, the consul was the head of the Roman government. While components of public administration were delegated to other magistrates, the management of the government was under the ultimate authority of the consul. The consuls presided over the Roman Senate and the Roman assemblies, and had the ultimate responsibility to enforce policies and laws enacted by both institutions. The consul was the chief diplomat, carried out business with foreign nations, and facilitated interactions between foreign ambassadors and the senate. Upon an order by the senate, the consul was responsible for raising and commanding an army. While the consuls had supreme military authority, they had to be provided with financial resources by the Roman Senate while they were commanding their armies. While abroad, the consul had absolute power over his soldiers, and over any Roman province.

The praetors administered civil law and commanded provincial armies, and, eventually, began to act as chief judges over the courts. Praetors usually stood for election with the consuls before the assembly of the soldiers, the Centuriate Assembly. After they were elected, they were granted imperium powers by the assembly. In the absence of both senior and junior consuls from the city, the Urban praetor governed Rome, and presided over the Roman Senate and Roman assemblies. Other praetors had foreign affairs-related responsibilities, and often acted as governors of the provinces. Since praetors held imperium powers, they could command an army.

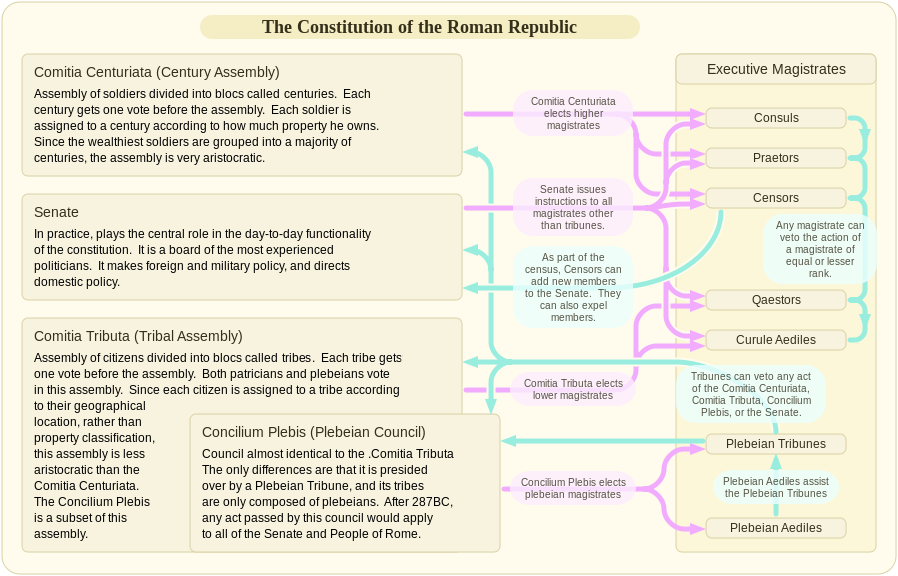
Chart Showing the Checks and Balances in the Constitution of the Roman Republic

Every five years, two censors were elected for an eighteen-month term. Since the censorship was the most prestigious of all offices, usually only former consuls were elected to it. Censors were elected by the assembly of Roman Soldiers, the Centuriate Assembly, usually after the new consuls and praetors for the year began their term. After the censors had been elected, the Centuriate Assembly granted the new censors censorial power. Censors did not have imperium powers, and they were not accompanied by any lictors. In addition, they did not have the power to convene the Roman Senate or Roman assemblies. Technically they outranked all other ordinary magistrates (including consuls and praetors). This ranking, however, was solely a result of their prestige, rather than any real power they had. Since the office could be easily abused (as a result of its power over every ordinary citizen), only former consuls (usually patrician consuls) were elected to the office. This is what gave the office its prestige. Their actions could not be vetoed by any magistrate other than a plebeian tribune, or a fellow censor. No other ordinary magistrate could veto a censor because no ordinary magistrate technically outranked a censor. Tribunes, by virtue of their sacrosanctity as the representatives of the people, could veto anything or anyone. Censors usually did not have to act in unison, but if a censor wanted to reduce the status of a citizen in a census, he had to act in unison with his colleague.

Censors could enroll citizens in the senate, or purge them from the senate. A censor had the ability to fine a citizen, or to sell his property, which was often a punishment for either evading the census or having filed a fraudulent registration. Other actions that could result in a censorial punishment were the poor cultivation of land, cowardice or disobedience in the army, dereliction of civil duties, corruption, or debt. A censor could reassign a citizen to a different tribe (a civil unit of division), or place a punitive mark (nota) besides a man's name on the register. Later, a law (one of the Leges Clodiae or "Clodian Laws") allowed a citizen to appeal a censorial nota. Once a census was complete, a purification ceremony (the lustrum) was performed by a censor, which typically involved prayers for the upcoming five years. This was a religious ceremony that acted as the certification of the census, and was performed before the Centuriate Assembly. Censors had several other duties as well, including the management of public contracts and the payment of individuals doing contract work for the state. Any act by the censor that resulted in an expenditure of public money required the approval of the senate.

Aediles were officers elected to conduct domestic affairs in Rome, and often assisted the higher magistrates. The office was not on the cursus honorum, and therefore did not mark the beginning of a political career. Every year, two curule aediles and two plebeian aediles were elected. The Tribal Assembly, while under the presidency of a higher magistrate (either a consul or praetor), elected the two curule aediles. While they had a curule chair, they did not have lictors, and thus they had no power of coercion. The Plebeian Council (principal popular assembly), under the presidency of a plebeian tribune, elected the two plebeian aediles. Aediles had wide-ranging powers over day-to-day affairs inside the city of Rome, and over the maintenance of public order. They had the power over public games and shows, and over the markets. They also had the power to repair and preserve temples, sewers and aqueducts, to maintain public records, and to issue edicts. Any expenditure of public funds, by either a curule aedile or a plebeian aedile, had to be authorized by the senate.

The office of quaestor was considered the lowest-ranking of all major political offices. Quaestors were elected by the Tribal Assembly, and the assignment of their responsibilities was settled by lot. Magistrates often chose which quaestor accompanied them abroad, and these quaestors often functioned as personal secretaries responsible for the allocation of money, including army pay. Urban quaestors had several important responsibilities, such as the management of the public treasury, (the aerarium Saturni) where they monitored all items going into, and coming out of, the treasury. In addition, they often spoke publicly about the balances available in the treasury. The quaestors could only issue public money for a particular purpose if they were authorized to do so by the senate. The quaestors were assisted by scribes, who handled the actual accounting for the treasury. The treasury was a repository for documents, as well as for money. The texts of enacted statutes and decrees of the Roman Senate were deposited in the treasury under the supervision of the quaestors.

== Plebeian magistrates ==
Since the plebeian tribunes and plebeian aediles were elected by the plebeians (commoners) in the Plebeian Council, rather than by all of the People of Rome (plebeians and the aristocratic patrician class), they were technically not magistrates. While the term "plebeian magistrate" (magistratus plebeii) has been used as an approximation, it is technically a contradiction. The plebeian aedile functioned as the tribune's assistant, and often performed similar duties as did the curule aediles (discussed above). In time, however, the differences between the plebeian aediles and the curule aediles disappeared.

Cornelia, mother of the future Gracchi tribunes, pointing to her children as her treasures

Since the tribunes were considered to be the embodiment of the plebeians, they were sacrosanct. Their sacrosanctity was enforced by a pledge, taken by the plebeians, to kill any person who harmed or interfered with a tribune during his term of office. All of the powers of the tribune derived from their sacrosanctity. One obvious consequence of this sacrosanctity was that it was considered a capital offense to harm a tribune, to disregard his veto, or to interfere with a tribune. The sacrosanctity of a tribune (and thus all of his legal powers) were only in effect so long as that tribune was within the city of Rome. If the tribune was abroad, the plebeians in Rome could not enforce their oath to kill any individual who harmed or interfered with the tribune. Since tribunes were technically not magistrates, they had no magisterial powers ("major powers" or maior potestas), and thus could not rely on such powers to veto. Instead, they relied on the sacrosanctity of their person to obstruct. If a magistrate, an assembly or the senate did not comply with the orders of a tribune, the tribune could 'interpose the sacrosanctity of his person' (intercessio) to physically stop that particular action. Any resistance against the tribune was tantamount to a violation of his sacrosanctity, and thus was considered a capital offense. Their lack of magisterial powers made them independent of all other magistrates, which also meant that no magistrate could veto a tribune.

Tribunes could use their sacrosanctity to order the use of capital punishment against any person who interfered with their duties. Tribunes could also use their sacrosanctity as protection when physically manhandling an individual, such as when arresting someone. On a couple of rare occasions (such as during the tribunate of Tiberius Gracchus), a tribune might use a form of blanket obstruction, which could involve a broad veto over all governmental functions. While a tribune could veto any act of the senate, the assemblies, or the magistrates, he could only veto the act, and not the actual measure. Therefore, he had to physically be present when the act was occurring. As soon as that tribune was no longer present, the act could be completed as if there had never been a veto.

Tribunes, the only true representatives of the people, had the authority to enforce the right of Provocatio, which was a theoretical guarantee of due process, and a precursor to our own habeas corpus. If a magistrate was threatening to take action against a citizen, that citizen could yell "provoco ad populum", which would appeal the magistrate's decision to a tribune. A tribune had to assess the situation, and give the magistrate his approval before the magistrate could carry out the action. Sometimes the tribune brought the case before the College of tribunes or the Plebeian Council for a trial. Any action taken in spite of a valid provocatio was on its face illegal.

== Extraordinary Magistrates ==
In times of emergency (military or otherwise), a Roman dictator (magister populi or "Master of the Nation") was appointed for a six-month term. The dictator's power over the Roman government was absolute, as they were not checked by any institution or magistrate. While the consul Cicero and the contemporary historian Livy do mention the military uses of the dictatorship, others, such as the contemporary historian Dionysius of Halicarnassus, mention its use for the purposes of maintaining order during times of plebeian unrest. For a dictator to be appointed, the Roman Senate had to pass a decree (a senatus consultum), authorizing a Roman consul to nominate a dictator, who then took office immediately. Often the dictator resigned his office as soon as the matter that caused his appointment was resolved. Ordinary magistrates (such as consuls and praetors) retained their offices, but lost their independence and became agents of the dictator. If they disobeyed the dictator, they could be forced out of office. While a dictator could ignore the right of Provocatio, that right, as well as the plebeian tribune's independence, theoretically still existed during a dictator's term. A dictator's power was equivalent to that of the power of the two consuls exercised conjointly, without any checks on their power by any other organ of government. Thus, dictatorial appointments were tantamount to a six-month restoration of the monarchy, with the dictator taking the place of the old Roman king. This is why, for example, each consul was accompanied by twelve lictors outside the pomerium or six inside, whereas the dictator (as the Roman King before him) was accompanied by twenty four lictors outside the pomerium or twelve inside.

Each dictator appointed a Master of the Horse (magister equitum or Master of the Knights), to serve as his most senior lieutenant. The Master of the Horse had constitutional command authority (imperium) equivalent to a praetor, and often, when they authorized the appointment of a dictator, the senate specified who was to be the Master of the Horse. In many respects, he functioned more as a parallel magistrate (like an inferior co-consul) than he did as a direct subordinate. Whenever a dictator's term ended, the term of his Master of the Horse ended as well. Often, the dictator functioned principally as the master of the infantry (and thus the legions), while the Master of the Horse (as the name implies) functioned as the master of the cavalry. The dictator, while not elected by the people, was technically a magistrate since he was nominated by an elected consul. The Master of the Horse was also technically a magistrate, since he was nominated by the dictator. Thus, both of these magistrates were referred to as "Extraordinary Magistrates".

The last ordinary dictator was appointed in 202 BC. After 202 BC, extreme emergencies were addressed through the passage of the senatus consultum ultimum ("ultimate decree of the senate") which suspended civil government, and declared something analogous to martial law. It declared "videant consules ne quid res publica detrimenti capiat" ("let the consuls see to it that the state suffer no harm") which, in effect, vested the consuls with dictatorial powers. There were several reasons for this change. Up until 202 BC, dictators were often appointed to fight plebeian unrest. In 217 BC, a law was passed that gave the popular assemblies the right to nominate dictators. This, in effect, eliminated the monopoly that the aristocracy had over this power. In addition, a series of laws were passed, which placed additional checks on the power of the dictator.

== See also ==
- Acta Senatus
- Byzantine Senate
- Centuria
- Curia
- Interrex
