= Gaetano Matteo Pisoni =

Swiss-Italian architect (1713–1782)

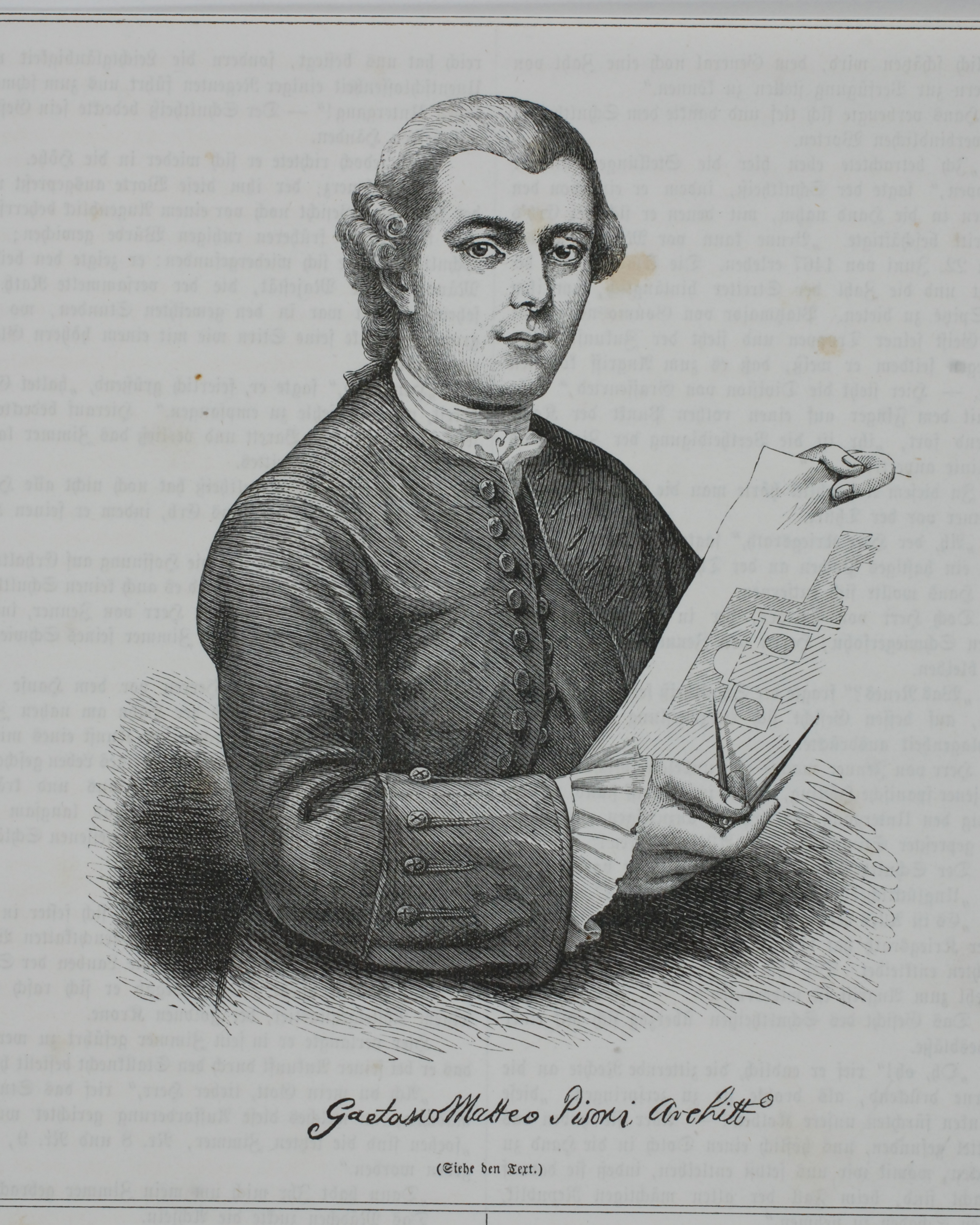
- Born: July 18, 1713; Ascona, Switzerland
- Died: March 4, 1782 (aged 68)
- Occupation: Architect
- Practice: Academic Late Baroque
- Buildings: St Aubin's Cathedral, St. Ursus' Cathedral

Gaetano Matteo Pisoni (July 18, 1713 – March 4, 1782) was an Italian architect born at Ascona, in the modern Swiss canton of Ticino, who worked in a somewhat chilly academic Late Baroque manner that lies on the cusp of the latest Baroque classicising manner and Neoclassical architecture. Pisoni is known especially for two small cathedrals built in an uncompromising Italian manner that makes each of them stand out in its urban context. One is St Aubin's Cathedral (built 1751-1767), in Namur, Belgium. The other is the larger St. Ursus' Cathedral (built 1763-1773), in Solothurn, Switzerland; it was completed by Pisoni's nephew and collaborator, Paolo Antonio Pisoni (1738-1804). The churches have similar interiors, of an unrelieved white, with rich architectural members and a richly sculptured frieze that runs entirely round.

The cathedral chapter at Namur, intent on rebuilding their aged and cramped cathedral, which had recently been damaged in a flood, turned to Pisoni in part because he was at work in Brussels, effecting alterations in the palace of the governor, Prince Charles Alexander of Lorraine, and thus had a local reputation. Pisoni died at Locarno. Gaetano Matteo Pisoni also built the St Jean's collegiate church in Liège Collégiale Saint-Jean-en-l'isle de Liège, with an exceptional plan, making of this church a unique and remarkable element of the Belgian architectural heritage.

== Sources ==
- Paul Philippot, Denis Coekelberghs, Pierre Loze, Dominique Vautier. L'architecture religieuse et la sculpture baroques dans les Pays-Bas méridionaux et la principauté de Liège 1600-1770 2003. Cultural context for Pisoni's St Aubin Cathedral.
