= SPQR =

Latin initialism referring to the government of the ancient Roman Republic

SPQR or S.P.Q.R., an initialism for Senatus Populusque Romanus (Classical Latin: [sɛˈnaːtʊs pɔpʊˈɫʊskʷɛ roːˈmaːnʊs]; transl. "The Senate and People of Rome"), is an emblematic phrase referring to the government of the Roman Republic. It appears on documents made public by an inscription in stone or metal, in dedications of monuments and public works, and on some Roman currency.

The full phrase appears in Roman political, legal and historical literature, such as the speeches of Cicero and the Ab Urbe Condita Libri (Books from the Founding of the City) of Livy.

== Translation ==
In Latin, Senātus is a nominative singular noun meaning "Senate". Populusque is compounded from the nominative noun Populus, "the People", and -que, an enclitic particle meaning "and" which connects the two nominative nouns. The last word, Rōmānus ("Roman"), is an adjective modifying the whole of Senātus Populusque: the "Roman Senate and People", taken as a whole. Thus, the phrase is translated literally as "The Roman Senate and People", or more freely as "The Senate and People of Rome".

An alternative interpretation of the acronym, provided by the dictionary IL – Vocabolario della lingua latina by Luigi Castiglioni and Scevola Mariotti, is ‘Senatus Populusque Quiritium Romanus’, that is: ‘the Roman Senate and People of the Quirites’; the Quirite (quiris) was, in fact, a citizen of ancient Rome who enjoyed full civil, political and even military rights.

== Historical context ==
The title's date of establishment is unknown, but it first appears in inscriptions of the Late Republic, from around 80 BC onwards. Previously, the official name of the Roman state, as evidenced on coins, was simply ROMA. The abbreviation last appears on coins of Constantine the Great (ruled 312–337 AD), the first Roman emperor to support Christianity.

This signature continued in use under the Roman Empire. The emperors were considered the de jure representatives of the people even though the senātūs consulta, or decrees of the Senate, were made at the de facto pleasure of the emperor.

Populus Romanus in Roman literature is a phrase meaning the government of the People. When the Romans named governments of foreign states, they used populus in the singular or plural, such as populi Priscorum Latinorum, "the governments of the Old Latins". Romanus is the established adjective used to distinguish the Romans, as in civis Romanus, "Roman citizen".

The Roman people appear very often in law and history in such phrases as dignitas, maiestas, auctoritas, libertas populi Romani, the "dignity, majesty, authority, freedom of the Roman people". They were a populus liber, "a free people". There was an exercitus, imperium, iudicia, honores, consules, voluntas of this same populus: "the army, rule, judgments, offices, consuls and will of the Roman people". They appear in early Latin as Popolus and Poplus, so the habit of thinking of themselves as free and sovereign was quite ingrained.

The Romans believed that all authority came from the people. It could be said that similar language seen in more modern political and social revolutions directly comes from this usage. People in this sense meant the whole government. The latter, however, was essentially divided into the aristocratic Senate, whose will was executed by the consuls and praetors, and the comitia centuriata, "committee of the centuries", whose will came to be safeguarded by the Tribunes.

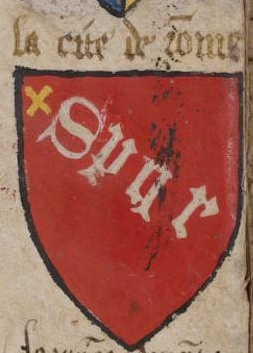
Medieval depiction of the coat of arms of Rome, c.1400

One of the ways the emperor Commodus (180–192) paid for his donatives and mass entertainments was to tax the senatorial order, and on many inscriptions, the traditional order is provocatively reversed (Populus Senatusque...).

== Medieval use ==
Beginning in 1184, the Commune of Rome struck coins in the name of the SENATVS P Q R. From 1414 until 1517, the Roman Senate struck coins with a shield inscribed SPQR.

== Modern use ==
Even in contemporary usage, SPQR is still used in the municipal coat of arms of Rome and as abbreviation for the comune of Rome in official documents. The Italians have long used a different and humorous expansion of this abbreviation, "Sono Pazzi Questi Romani" (lit. 'They're crazy, these Romans'). SPQR is also part of the coat of arms of the Capital Military Command of the Italian army (Italian: Comando Militare Capitale).

Modern coat of arms of Rome

In business, in English-speaking countries, SPQR is sometimes (humorously) used to mean "Small Profits, Quick Returns", often by people who have studied Latin at school.

=== Civic references ===
SPQx is sometimes used as an assertion of municipal pride and civic rights. The Italian town of Reggio Emilia, for instance, has SPQR in its coat of arms, standing for Senatus Populusque Regiensis. There are historic usages of the deployment of the "SPQx" format in various other cities and towns:

City	Country	SPQx	Latin	Where has it been used	Image
Alkmaar	Netherlands	SPQA		On the façade of the Waag building	
Amsterdam	Netherlands	SPQA	Senatus Populusque Amstelodamensis	At the Stadsschouwburg theater on Leidseplein and some of the bridges	
Antwerp	Belgium	SPQA	Senatus Populusque Antverpensis	On Antwerp City Hall and other public buildings and schools	
Ascoli Piceno	Italy	SPQA	Senatus Populusque Asculum	On the wall above the south loggia of the Piazza del Popolo	
Basel	Switzerland	SPQB	Senatus Populusque Basilea	On the Webern-Brunnen in Steinenvorstadt	
Benevento	Italy	SPQB	Senatus Populusque Beneventanus	On manhole covers	
Bologna	Italy	SPQB	Senatus Populusque Bonononiensis	On the Fountain of Neptune	
Bremen	Germany	SPQB		In Bremen City Hall.	
Bruges	Belgium	SPQB		On its coat of arms	
Brussels	Belgium	SPQB	Senatus Populusque Bruxellensis (of the city) or Senatus Populusque Belgicus (of the country)	Repeatedly on the Palace of Justice, over the main stage of the Royal Theatre of La Monnaie, and on the ceiling of the hemicycle of the Belgian Senate in the Palace of the Nation.	
Capua	Italy	SPQC			
Catania	Italy	SPQC		On manhole covers	
Chicago	United States	SPQC	Senatus Populusque Chicago	On the George N. Leighton Cook County Criminal Courthouse	
Dublin	Ireland	SPQH	Senatus Populusque Hibernicus	On the City Hall, built in 1769	
Florianópolis	Brazil	SPQF	Senatus Populusque Florianopolitanus		
Franeker	Netherlands	SPQF		At the a gate on the Westerbolwerk and Academiestraat 16	
Freising	Germany	SPQF		Above the door of the town hall	
Ghent	Belgium	SPQG	Senatus Populusque Gandavensis	On the opera house, theatre and some other major buildings, inscribed on a shield on coins struck in Ghent in 1583, during the Dutch Revolt	
Groningen	Netherlands	SPQG		Above the entrance of the Der Aa-kerk	
The Hague	Netherlands	SPQH		Above the stage in the Koninklijke Schouwburg	
Hamburg	Germany	SPQH		On a door in the city hall (Hamburg Rathaus)	
Hanover	Germany				
Haarlem	Netherlands	SPQH		On the façade of the town hall at the "Grote Markt"	
Hasselt	Belgium	SPQH			
Hindeloopen	Netherlands	SPQH	Senatus Populusque Hindelopia	On a stone pole next to the Oosterdijk, a road between Hindeloopen and Workum.	
Istanbul	Turkey	SPQC	Senatus Populusque Constantinopolitanus		
Kortrijk	Belgium	SPQC	Senatus Populusque Cortoriacum	On the City hall	
Kraków	Poland	SPQC	Senatus Populusque Cracoviensis	Over the Waza Gate in Wawel Castle	
La Plata	Argentina	SPQR		On a monument outside of the city's casco urbano	
Leeuwarden	Netherlands	SPQL	Senatus Populusque Leovardia	On the mayor's chain of office	
Leuven	Belgium	SPQL	Senatus Populusque Leuvensis	Over the painting of Jesus in the back reception room inside Leuven Town Hall	
Liverpool	United Kingdom	SPQL	Senatus Populusque Liverpudliensis	On various gold doors in St George's Hall	
City of London	United Kingdom	SPQL	Senatus Populusque Londiniensis	On historic variants of the City's coat of arms	
Lübeck	Germany	SPQL	Senatus Populusque Lubecensis	On the Holstentor	
Lucerne	Switzerland				
Madrid	Spain	SPQM	Senatus Populusque Matritensis	On the Fuente de Apolo, built in 1780	
Milan	Italy	SPQM		The Holy Roman Emperor Charles V struck coins at Milan with the inscription S P Q Mediol Optimo Principi.	
Modica	Italy	SPQM		On the coat of arms	
Molfetta	Italy	SPQM		On the coat of arms	
Naples	Italy	SPQN	Senatus Populusque Neāpolis	Inscribed on a shield on coins struck during Masaniello's 1647 revolt	
Noto	Italy	SPQN	Senatus Populusque Netum	On the coat of arms and the façade of Noto Cathedral.	
Nuremberg	Germany	SPQN	Senatus Populusque Norimbergensis	On the Charles Bridge (one of the major bridges over river Pegnitz in the inner city)	
Oudenburg	Belgium	SPQO	Senatus Populusque Odenburgensis	On its water pump next to the market square	
Olomouc	Czech Republic	SPQO	Senatus Populusque Olomucensis	On the coat of arms	
Palermo	Italy	SPQP			
Penne, Abruzzo	Italy	SPQP			
Pontecorvo	Italy	SPQF		Used as motto for municipal coat of arms	
Rieti	Italy	SPQS	Senatus Populusque Sabinus	On the coat of arms, present also in the modern composite Lazio coat-of-arms	
Rotterdam	Netherlands	SPQR		Mural in the Burgerzaal of Rotterdam City Hall	
Severn Beach	United Kingdom	SPQR		On the crest of Pilning & Severn Beach Parish Council	
Seville	Spain	SPQH	Senatus Populusque Hispalensis	On the historic banner of the city	
Siena	Italy	SPQS		On the base of a statue of the Capitoline Wolf	
Solothurn	Switzerland	SPQS	Senatus Populusque Solodori	On the Cathedral of St Ursus and Victor	
Terracina	Italy	SPQT			
Tivoli, Lazio	Italy	SPQT			
Toruń	Poland	SPQT	Senatus Populusque Thorunensis	On the City Hall	
Valencia	Spain	SPQV	Senatus Populusque Valentinus	In several places and buildings, including the Silk Exchange and the University of Valencia Historic Building.	
Verviers	Belgium	SPQV		On the Grand Theatre	
Vienna	Austria	SPQV	Senatus Populusque Viennensis	Above the main entrance of the civic armoury (Bürgerliches Zeughaus) at Am Hof, with a dedication to Holy Roman Emperor Charles VI (Imperante Carolo VI. instauravit)	
Winschoten	Netherlands	SPQW	Senatus Populesque Winschotanus	On the façade of the municipal office (stadhuis) of Oldambt	
Workum	Netherlands	SPQW		On a stone pole next to the Oosterdijk, a road between Hindeloopen and Workum.	

== Gallery ==
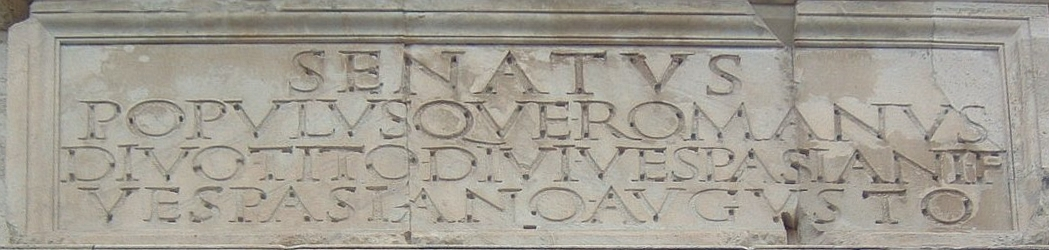
The inscription on the Arch of Titus

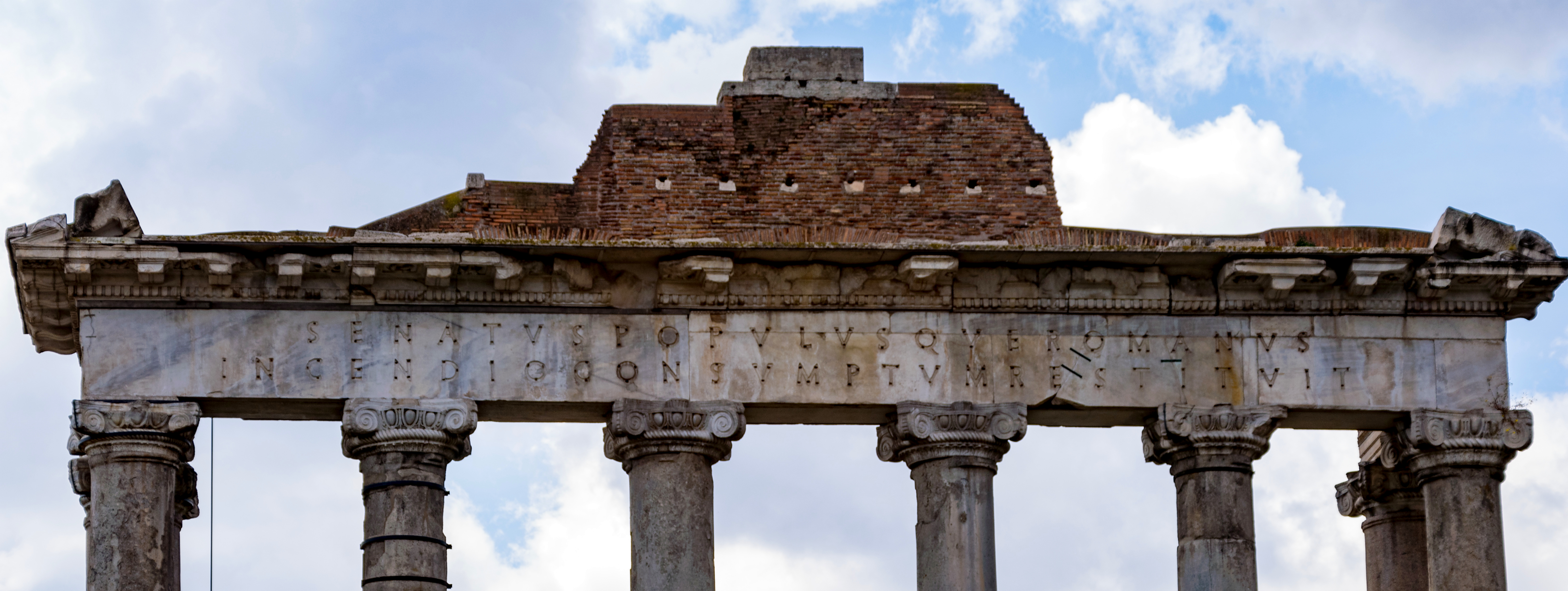
The inscription on the Temple of Saturn

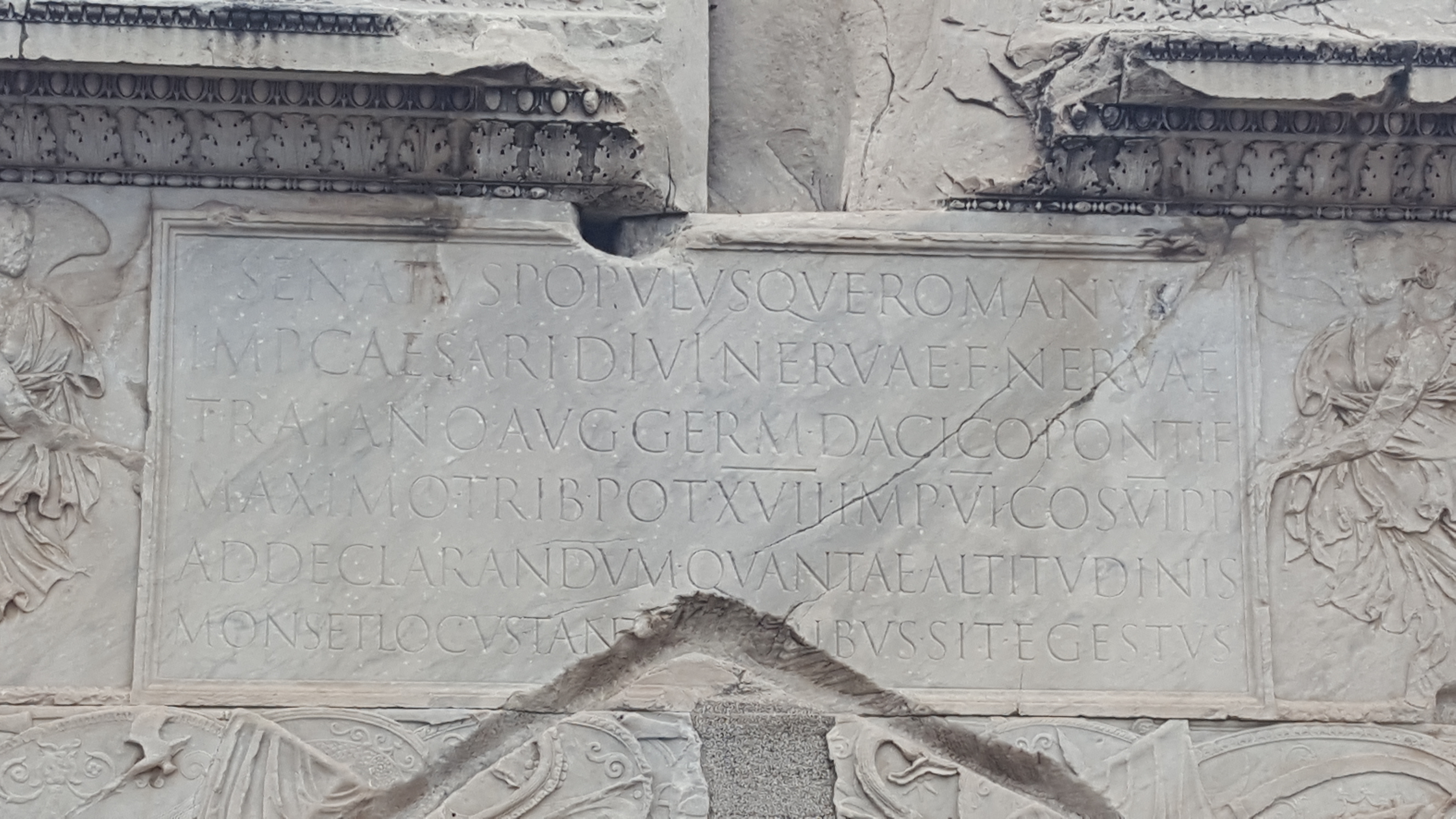
The inscription on Trajan's Column

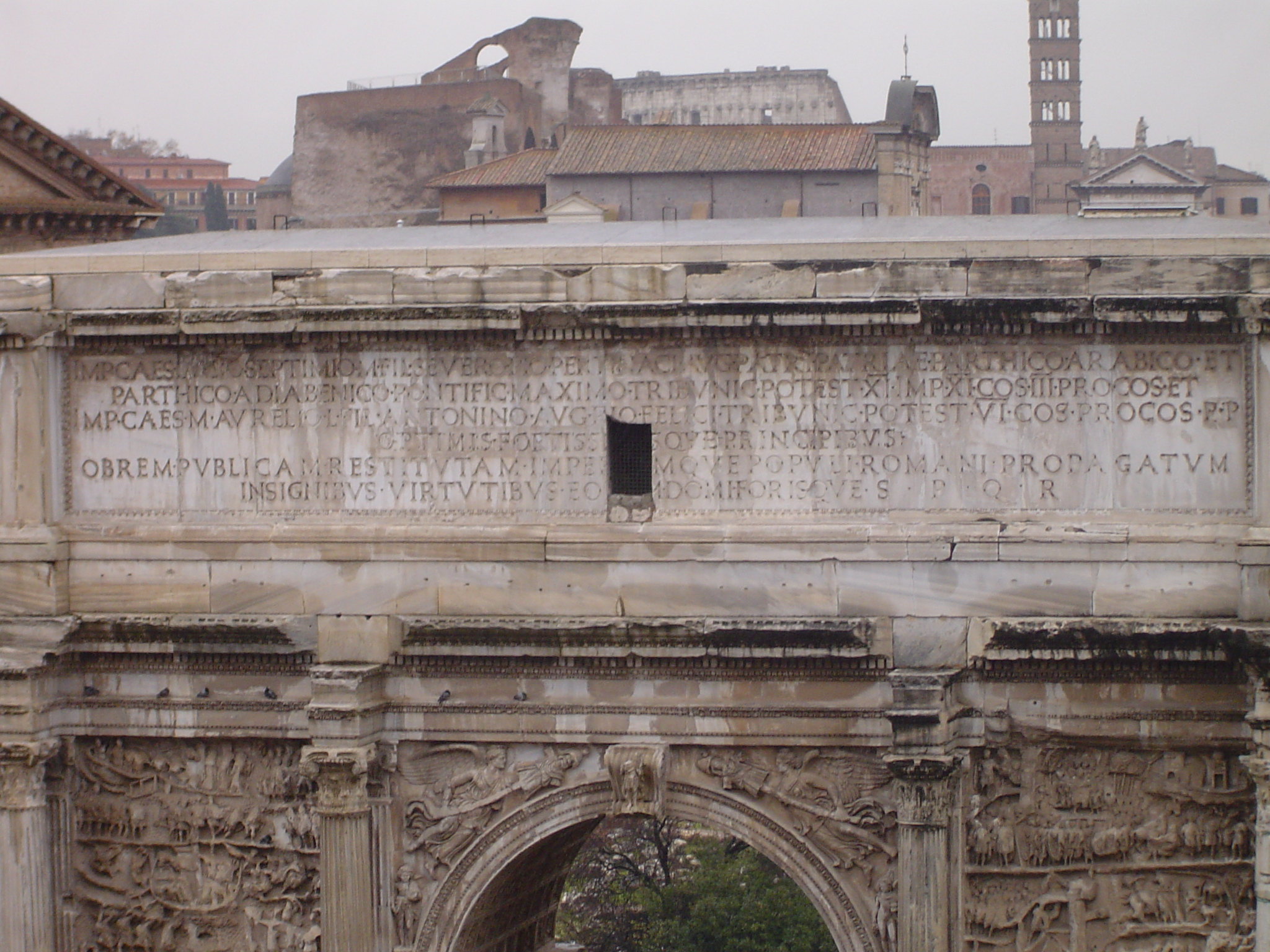
Arch of Septimius Severus top inscription

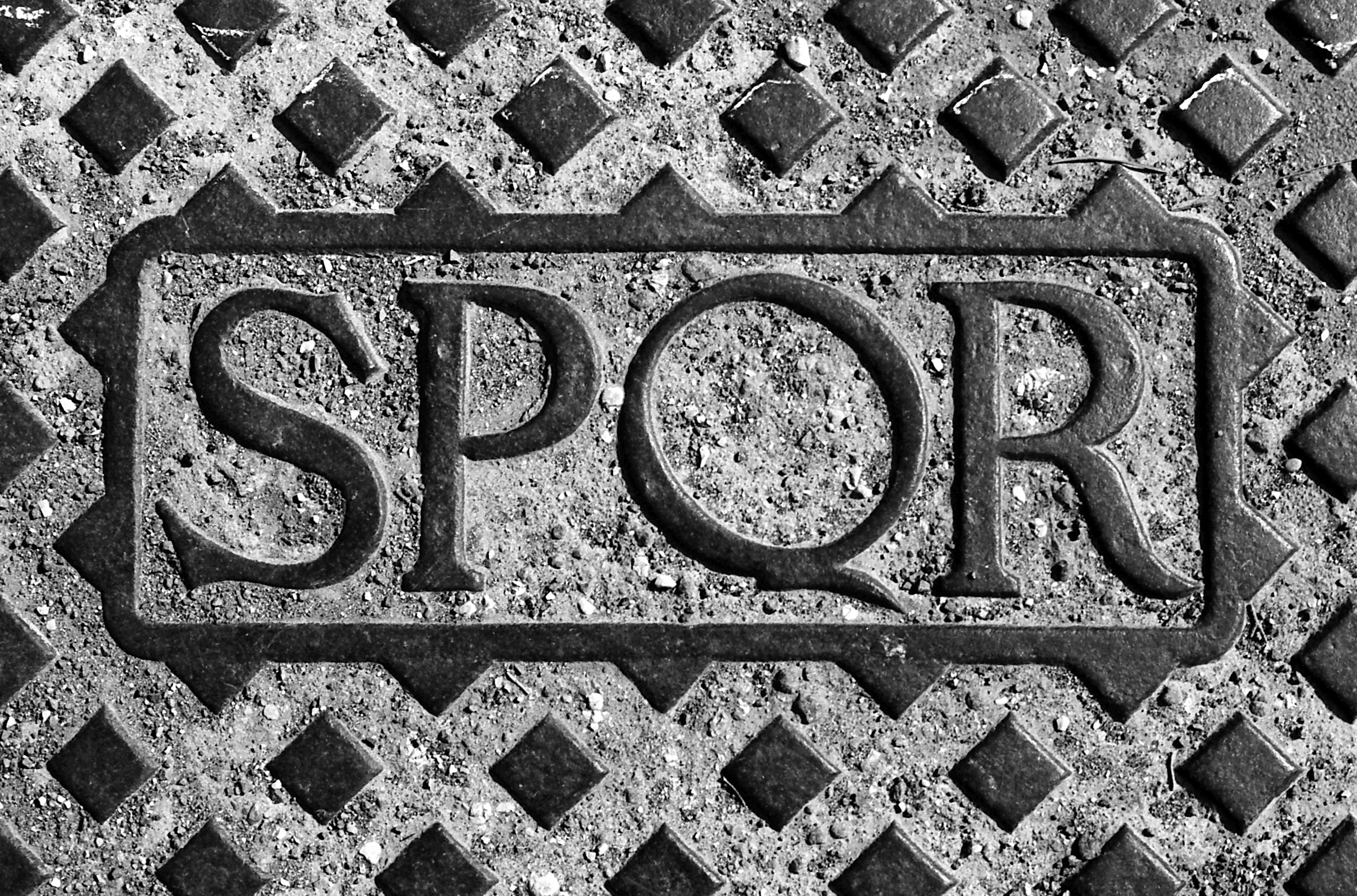
Manhole cover in Rome with SPQR inscription

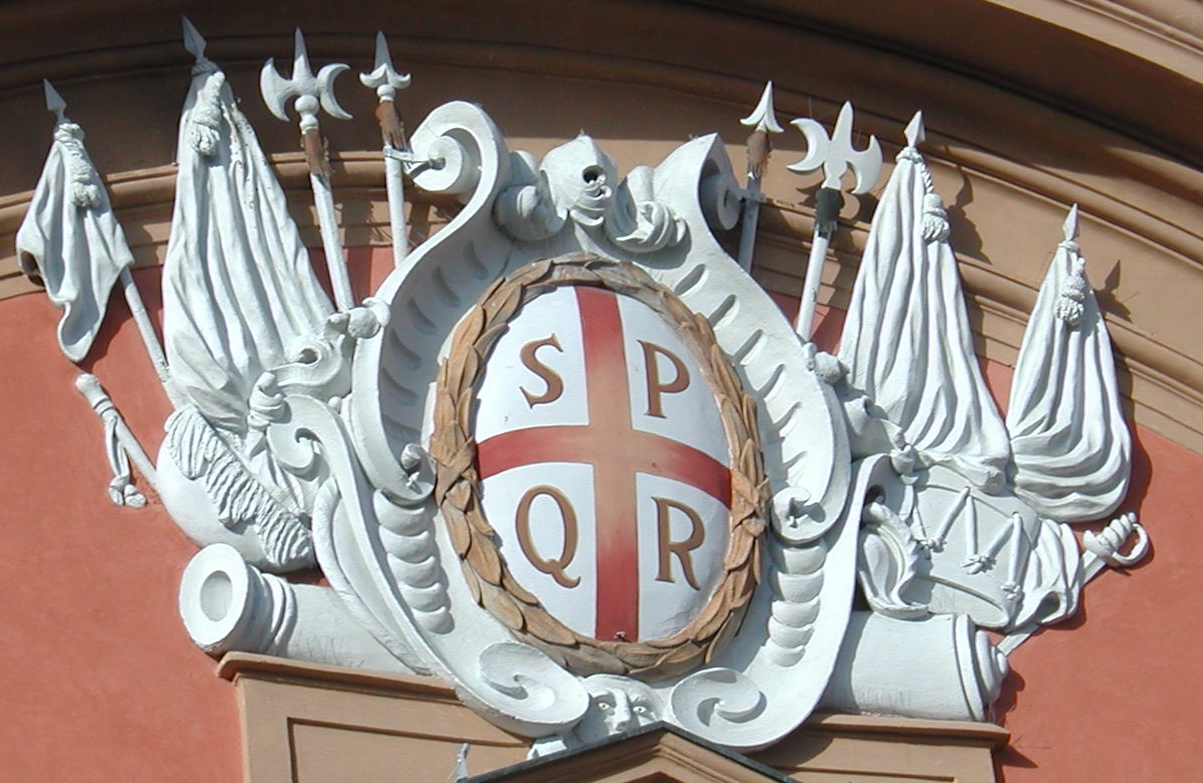
SPQR in the coat of arms of Reggio Emilia

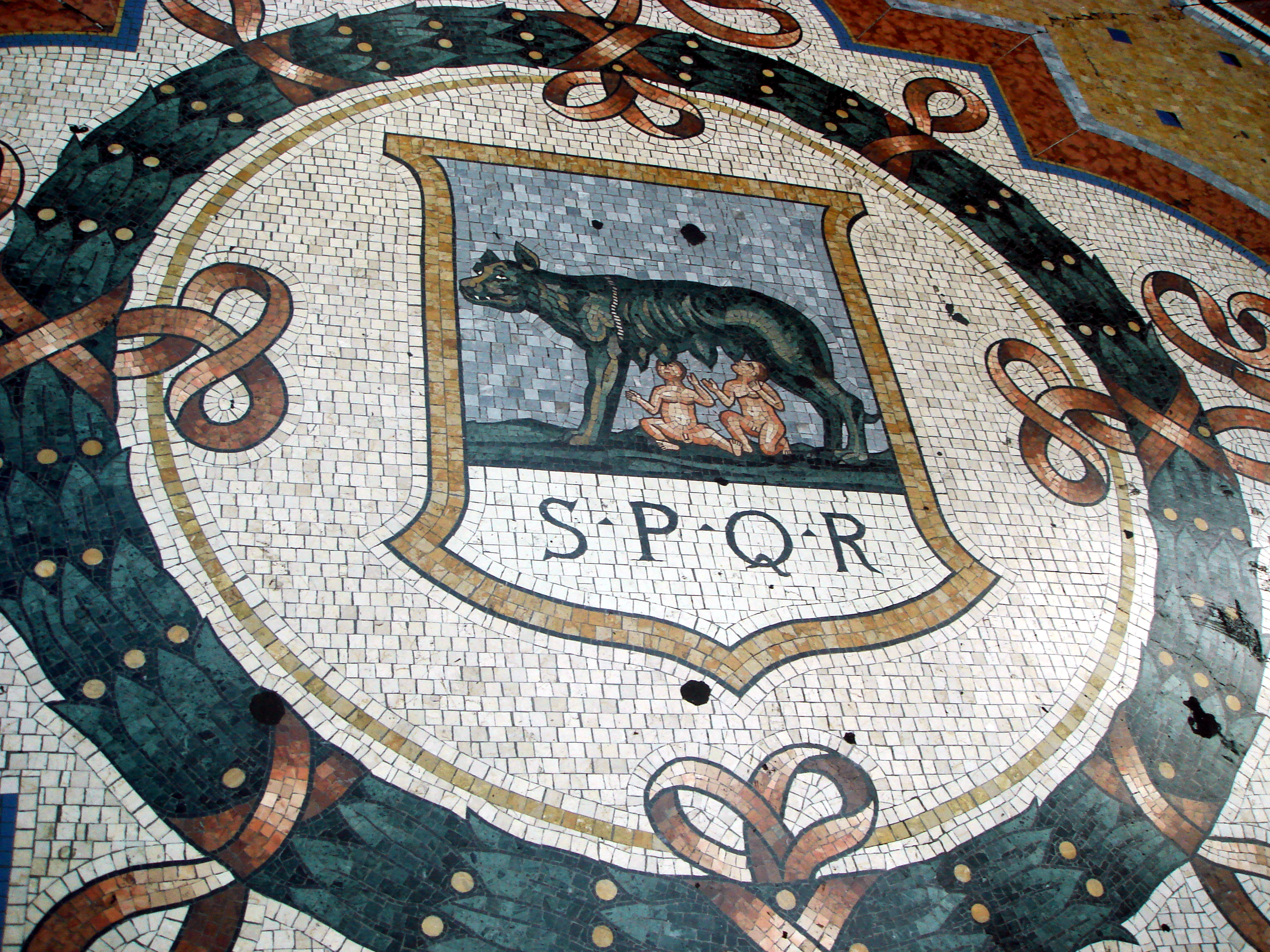
Detail from the mosaic floor in the Galleria Vittorio Emanuele II in Milan

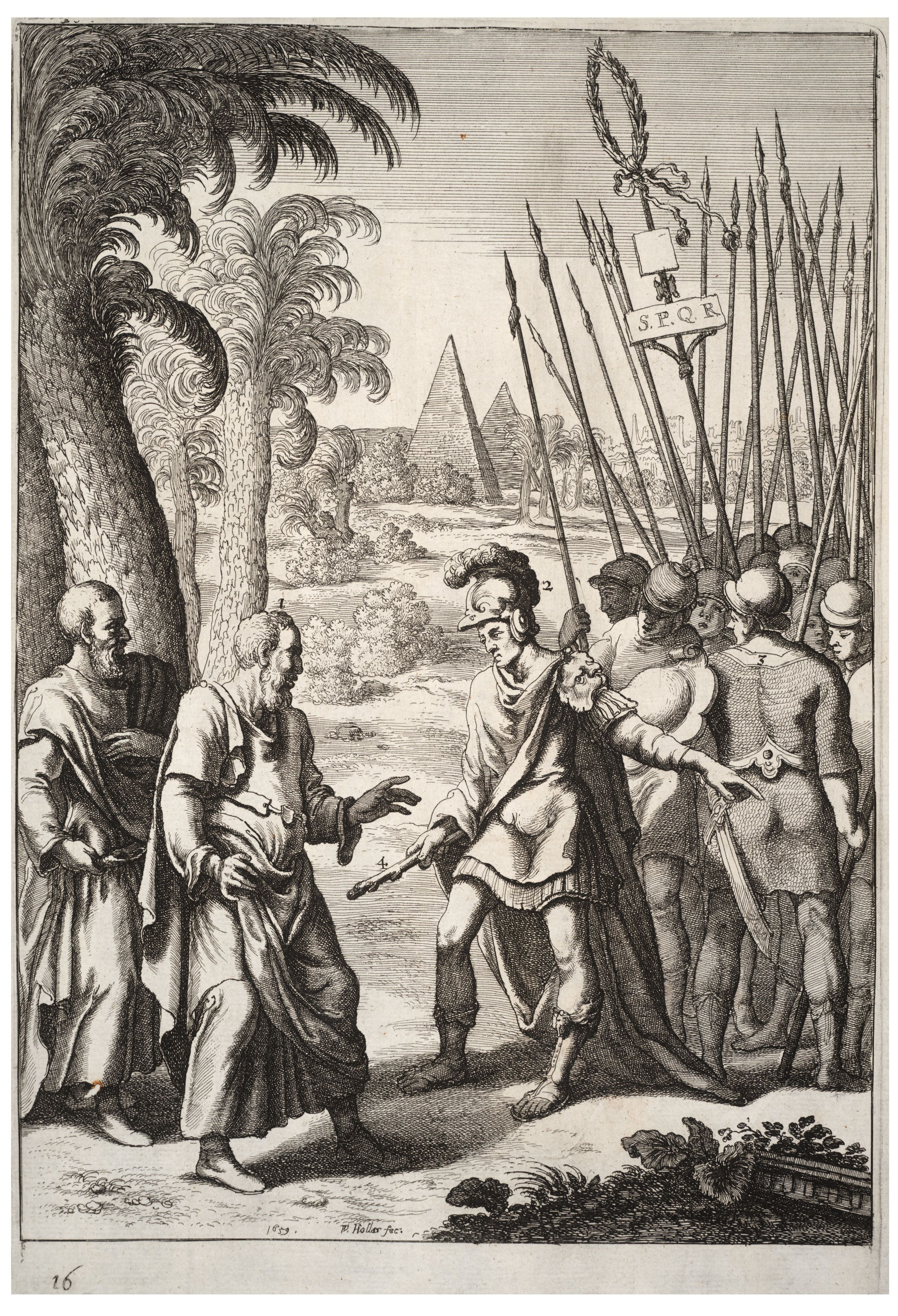
"Superiority of the warrior class", by Wenceslaus Hollar

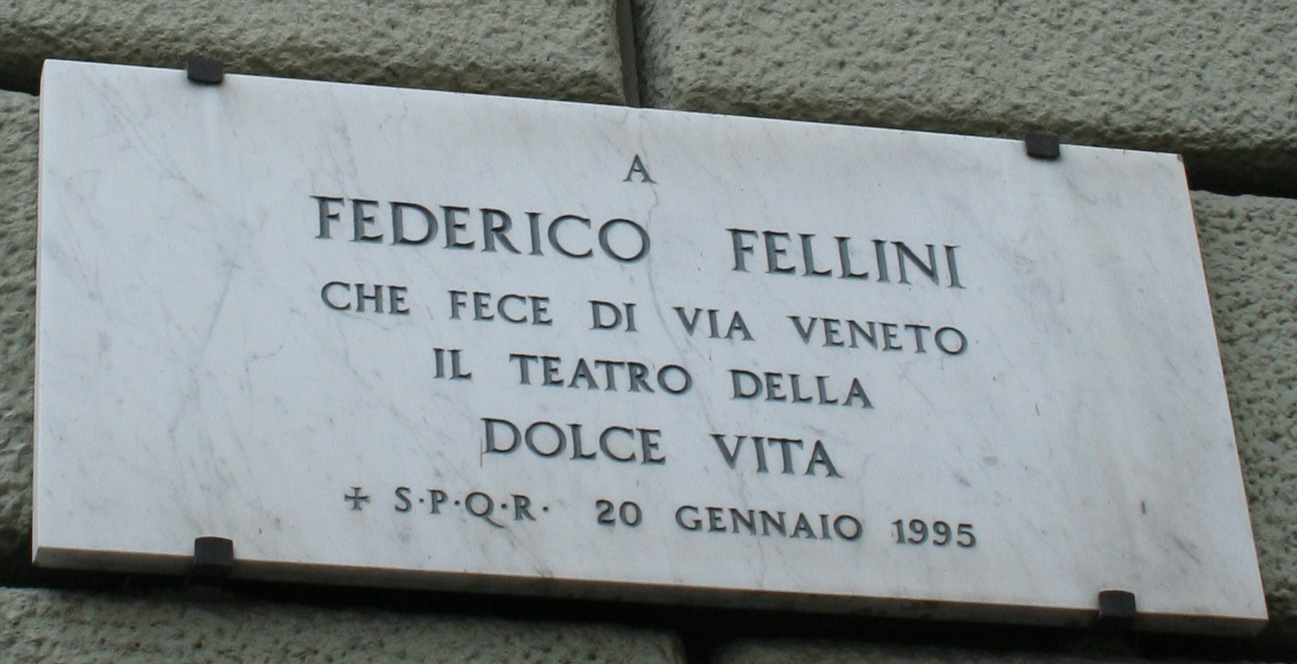
Dedicatory plaque to Federico Fellini on Via Veneto

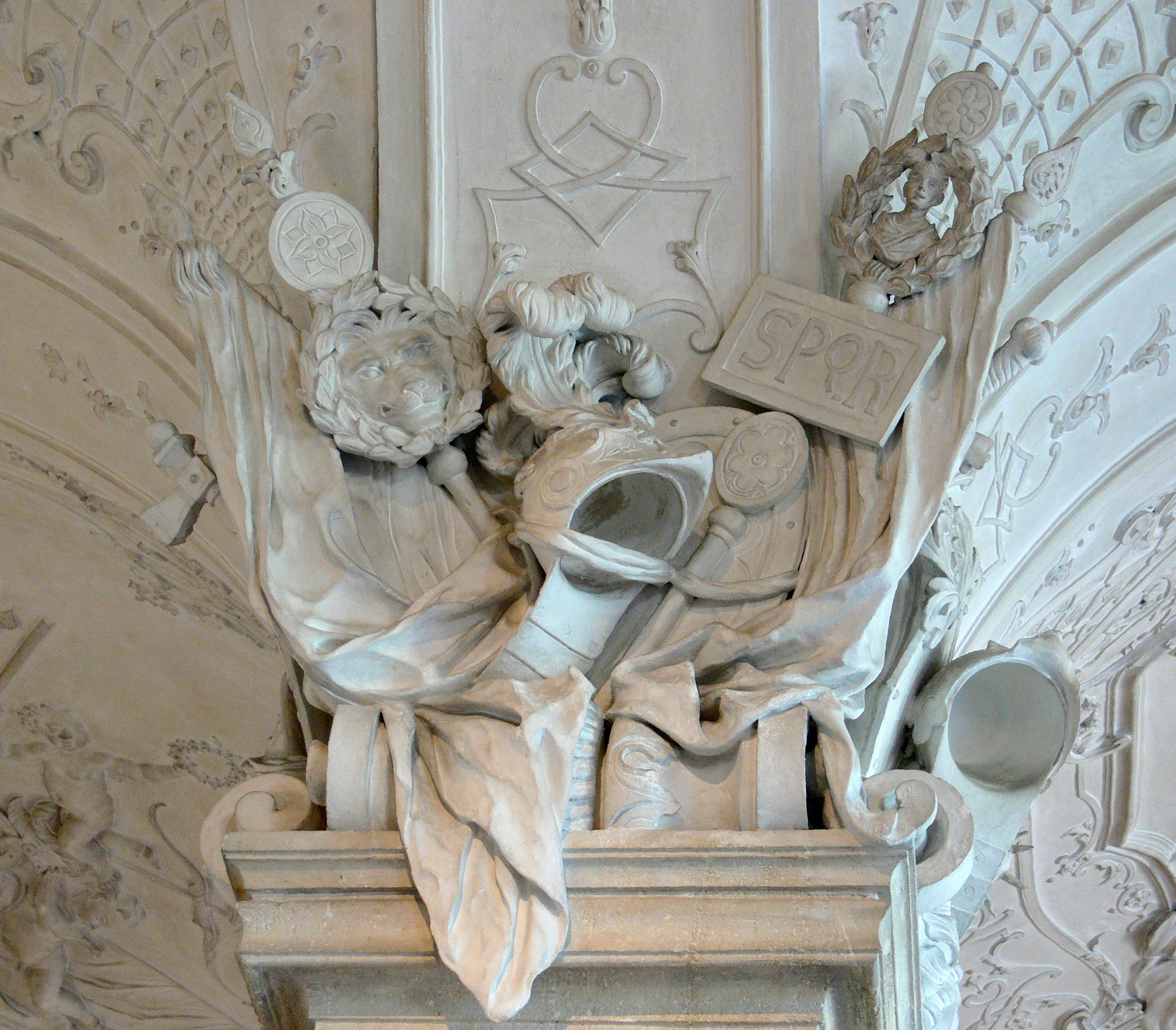
Field symbol (right) at the Belvedere palace, Vienna
