= Victor of Solothurn =

3rd-century Christian martyr and saint

Saint Victor of Solothurn
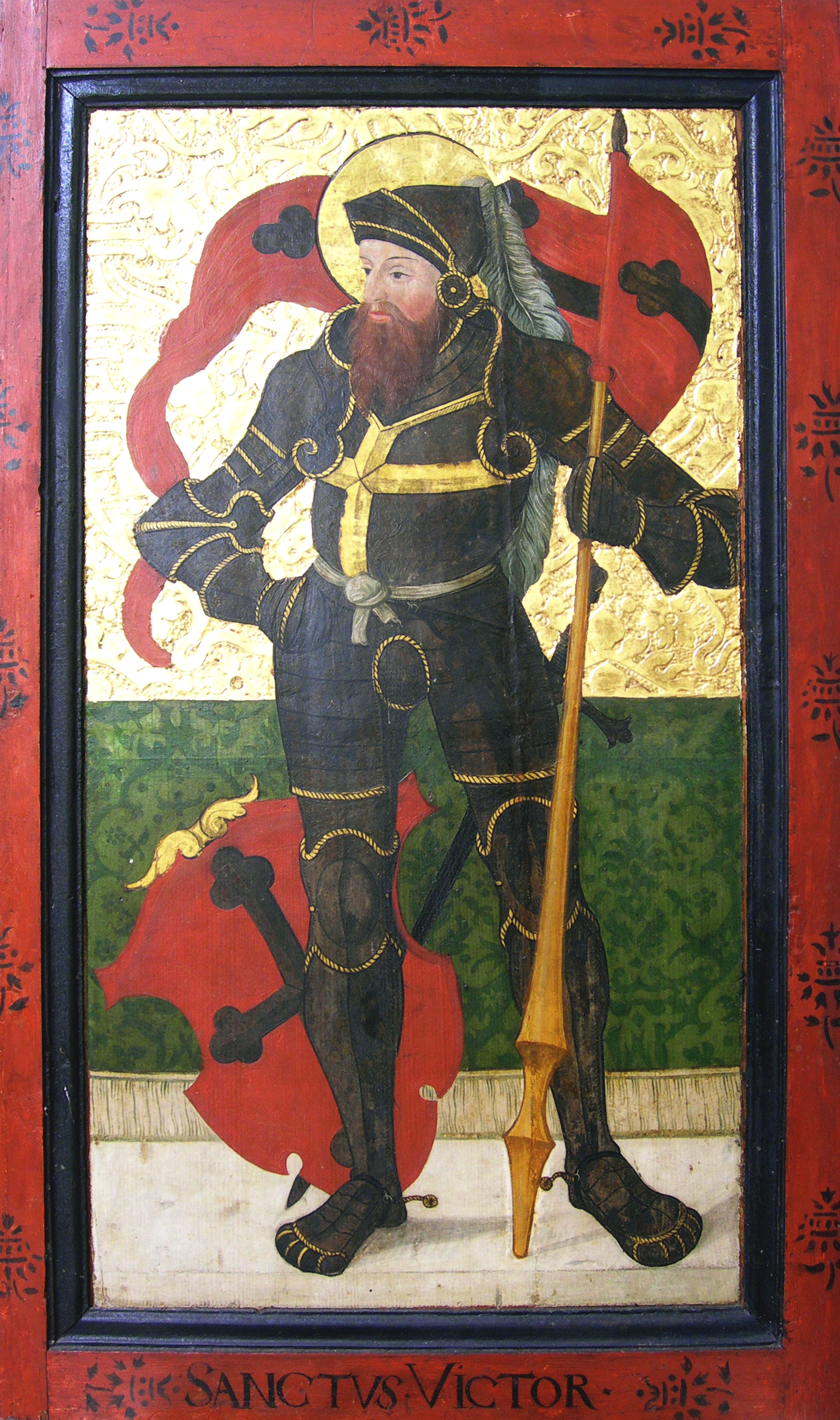
- Born: Unknown
- Died: c. 287
- Venerated in: Eastern Orthodoxy; Roman Catholicism; Coptic Orthodoxy
- Feast: September 30; September 22 (as a martyr of the Theban Legion)

Victor of Solothurn, known in Geneva as Saint-Victor de Genève, is a martyr and saint of the Catholic Church. He was a soldier of the Theban Legion led by Maurice and died in Solothurn.

== Legend ==
Victor was one of the soldiers of the famous Theban legion that, under the leadership of Maurice was dispatched to put down a revolt in Gaul. The soldiers came from the Egyptian city of Thebes, and were for the most part Christians. Sent to clear the Great St Bernard Pass across the Alps, they arrived at Agaunum, the present town of Sankt-Moritz in Switzerland. When ordered to harass some local Christians, they refused. They then refused to sacrifice to the Roman gods, because that would have meant betraying their own God. This cost them all their lives.

Otto of Freising wrote in his Chronica de duabus civitatibus that many of the legionaries escaped and only some were executed at Agaunum, and the others apprehended later and put to death both at Bonn and Köln. Victor reached Solothurn near Bern before the Roman authorities caught up with him and he was beheaded.

== Veneration ==
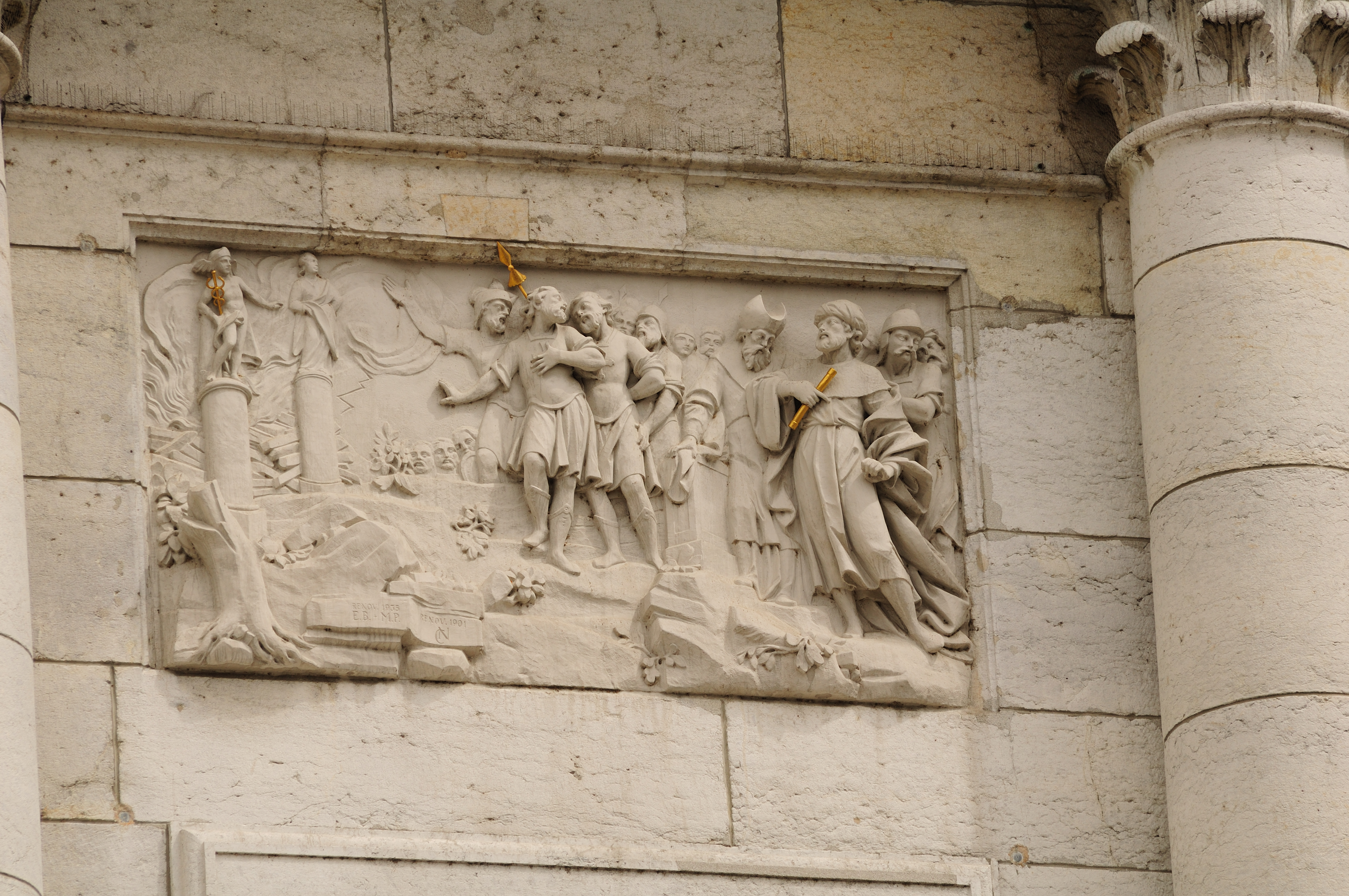
Kathedrale of St. Urs und Viktor, Solothurn

In 480 the body of Victor was brought to Geneva by the Burgundian Queen Theudelinde. He is buried in the former St-Victor's Basilica in Geneva.

Victor is the patron saint of the city of Geneva. He and Ursus of Solothurn are patron saints of the Cathedral of St. Ursus and St. Victor in Solothurn, Switzerland. A relief on the front facade shows Saints Ursus and Victor refusing to worship idols.

His feast day is 30 September.
