= Ursus of Solothurn =

3rd-century Roman Christian venerated as a saint

Saint Ursus of Solothurn
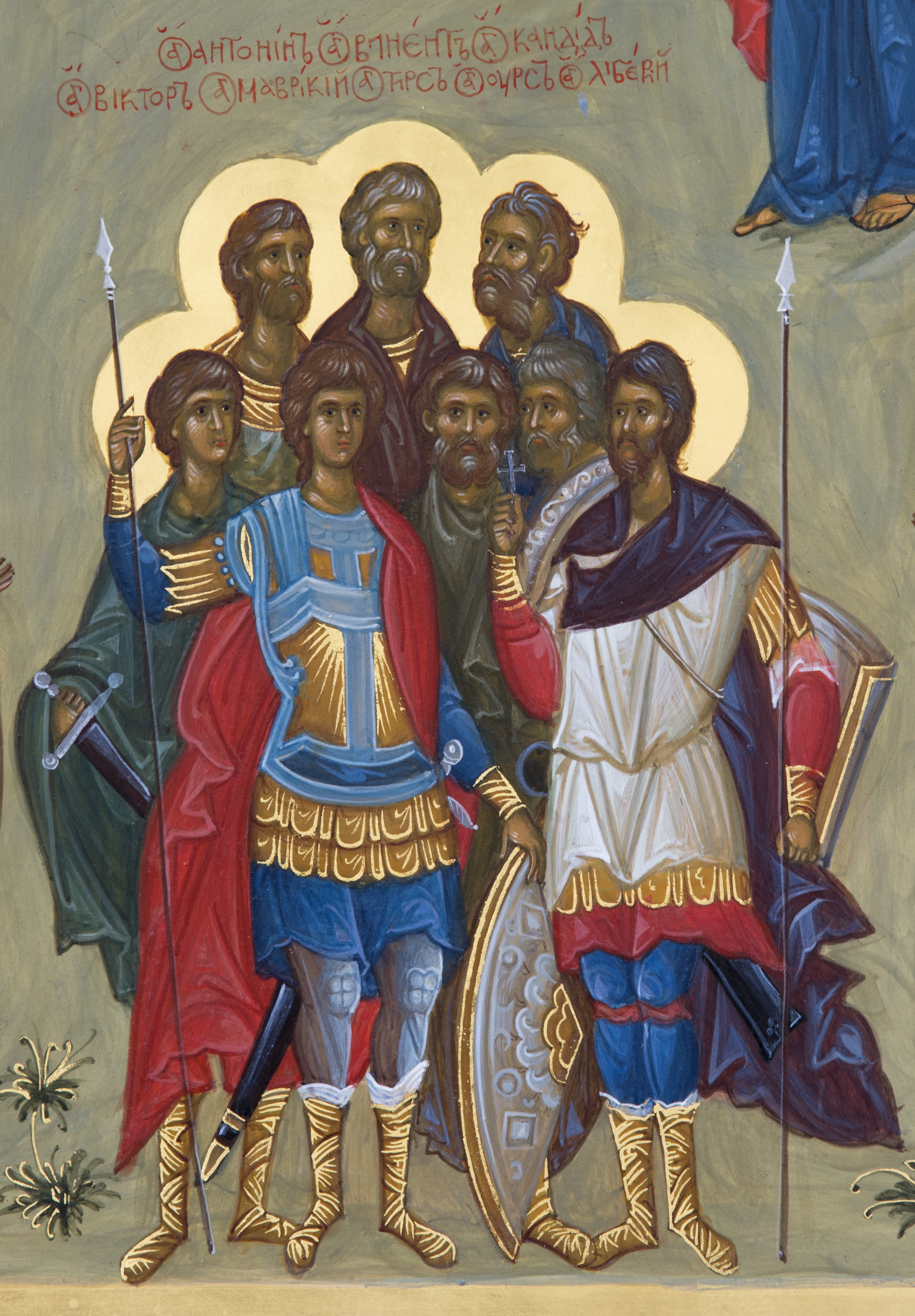
- St. Ursus (fourth man from the left in the bottom row) depicted in a Russian Orthodox icon amongst the Theban Legion

Martyr
- Died: c. 286 AD
- Venerated in: Eastern Orthodox Church; Coptic church Roman Catholic church
- Major shrine: Solothurn
- Feast: 30 September
- Attributes: military attire, martyr's cross
- Patronage: Solothurn

Ursus of Solothurn was a 3rd-century Roman Christian who is venerated as a saint in the Eastern Orthodox Church, Coptic church and Roman Catholic church. He was associated very early with the Theban Legion and is recorded in the Roman Martyrology, commemorated with St. Victor of Solothurn on 30 September.

== Biography ==
The Life of Ursus was written by Eucherius of Lyon in the 5th century; it recounts that Ursus was tortured and beheaded at Solothurn under Emperor Maximian and the governor Hyrtacus for refusing to worship idols around 286. The legend is classed by Bollandist Hippolyte Delehaye among the historical romances.

== Veneration ==
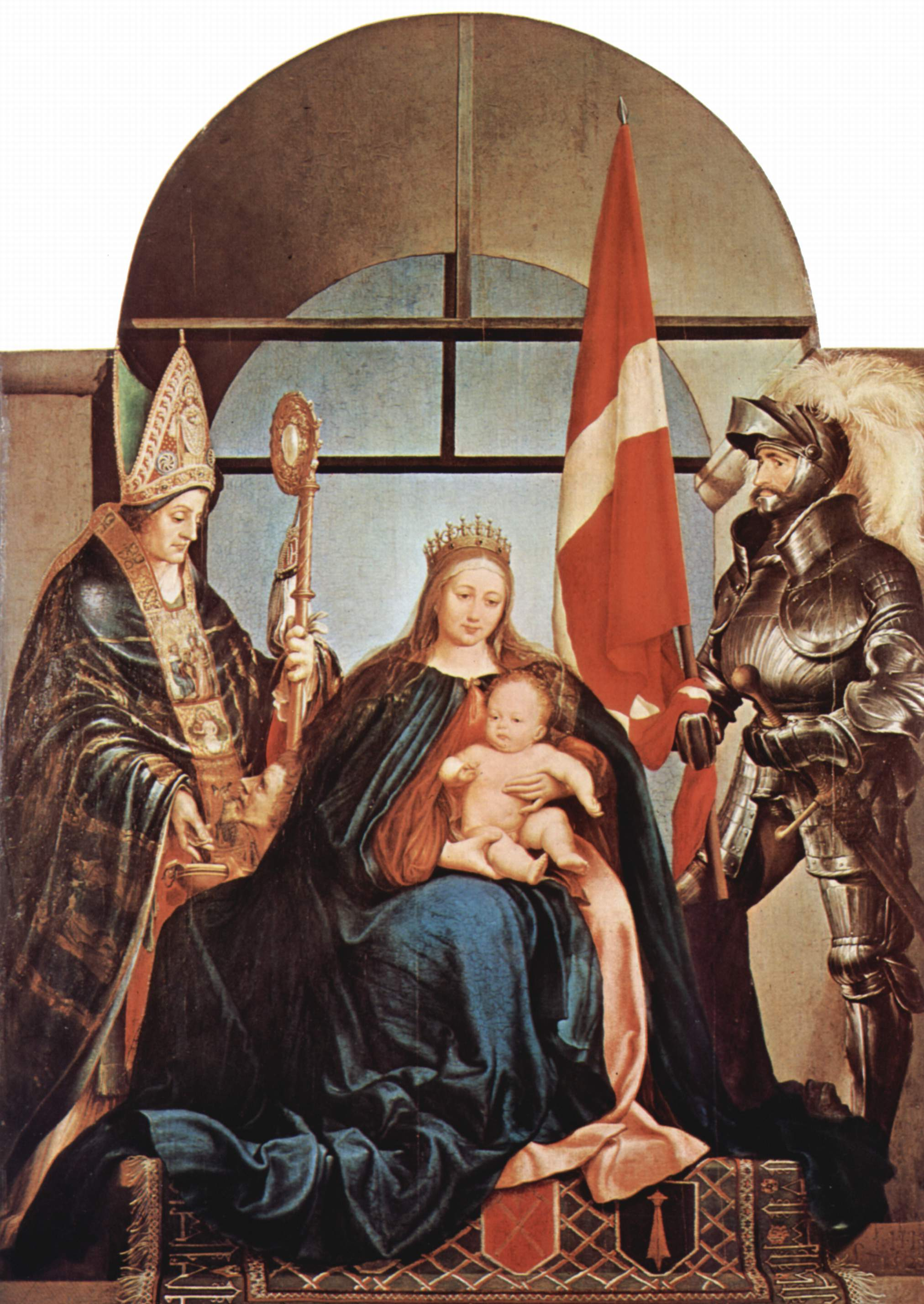
Solothurn Madonna, Hans Holbein

The first church dedicated to Ursus in Solothurn was probably built after Victor of Solothurn's remains were taken to Geneva in the late 7th century. The Treaty of Meerssen of 870 mentions a monastery of St. Ursus in Solothurn.

His relics are displayed in churches throughout Switzerland, and his coffin was found in 1519 under the choir altar of St. Ursen. His feast day is September 30.

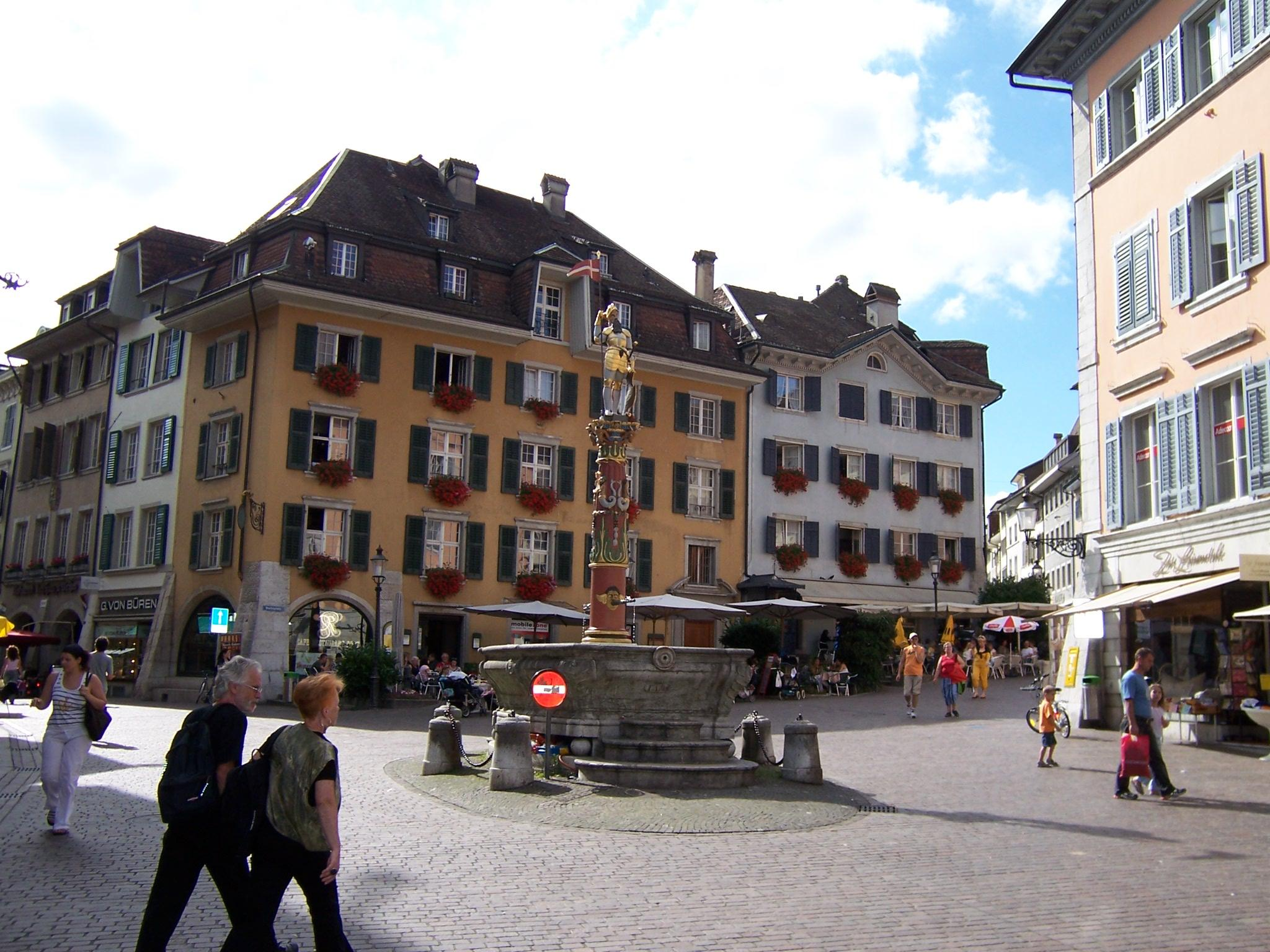
Saint Ursus Fountain in Solothurn, Switzterland, where St. Ursus is depicted as a soldier.

=== Iconography ===
Ursus is depicted as a soldier in arms, often with his head under his arm. He is depicted in the Solothurn Madonna by Hans Holbein the Younger.

=== Patronage ===
Ursus is the patron of the Roman Catholic cathedral in Solothurn, Switzerland, where his body is located.
