= Solothurn Cathedral =

Cathedral of St. Ursus
- Cathedral of St. Urs and Viktor
- German: Kathedrale St. Urs und Viktor
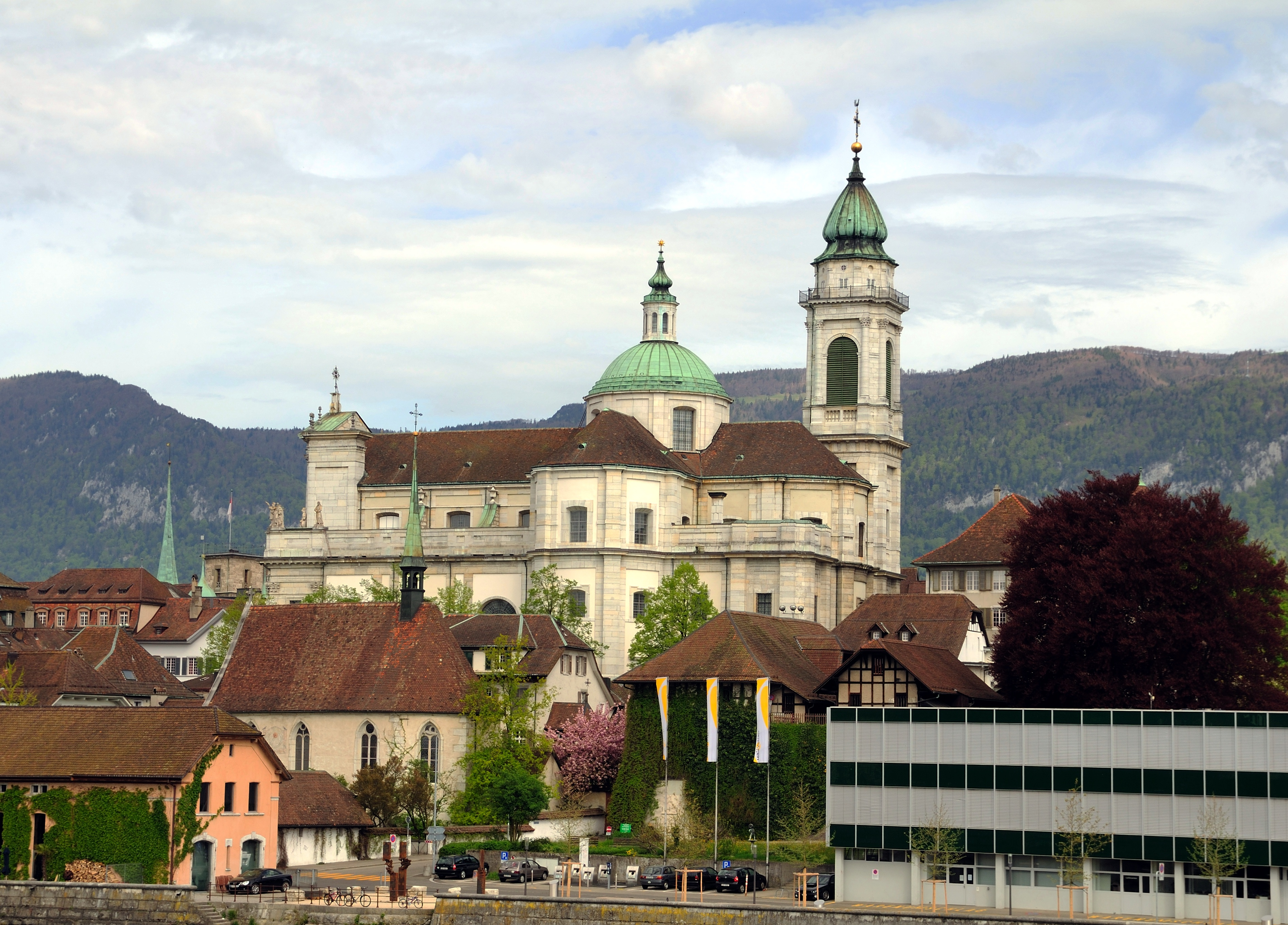

- St. Ursus Cathedral
- 47.208311°N 7.539466°E
- Country: Switzerland
- Denomination: Roman Catholic
- Website: Diocese of Basel

History
- Status: Cathedral
- Consecrated: 26 September 1773

Architecture
- Functional status: Active
- Heritage designation: Heritage site of national significance
- Architect(s): Gaetano Matteo Pisoni, Paolo Antonio Pisoni
- Architectural type: Cathedral
- Style: Neoclassical
- Groundbreaking: 1763
- Completed: 26 September 1773

Specifications
- Materials: Solothurn Limestone

Administration
- Diocese: Basel
- Parish: St. Ursen, Solothurn

Clergy
- Bishop: Felix Gmür

The St. Ursus Cathedral (Cathedral of St. Ursus) or Solothurn Cathedral is the cathedral of the Roman Catholic Diocese of Basel in the city of Solothurn, Switzerland. It is a Swiss heritage site of national significance.

== Patronage ==
Ursus and Victor were 3rd-century Roman martyrs and saints. They were associated very early with the Theban Legion, who were, according to the hagiography of the legion, martyred for refusing to worship the Emperor. The Life of Ursus was written by Saint Eucherius of Lyon in the 5th century; it recounts that Ursus was tortured and beheaded under Emperor Maximian and the governor Hyrtacus for refusing to worship idols around 286.

== History ==
=== First church ===
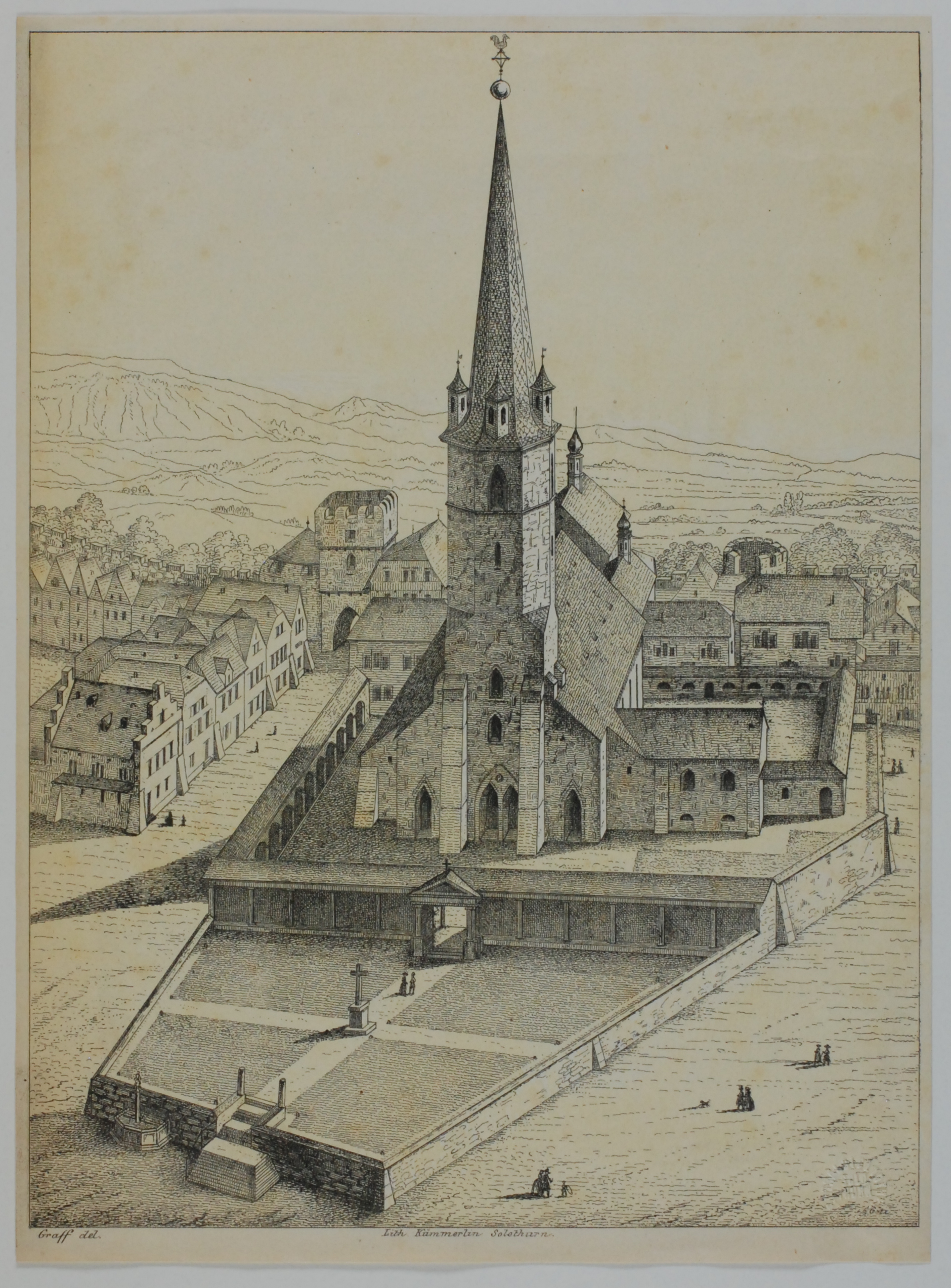
The old church of St. Ursus

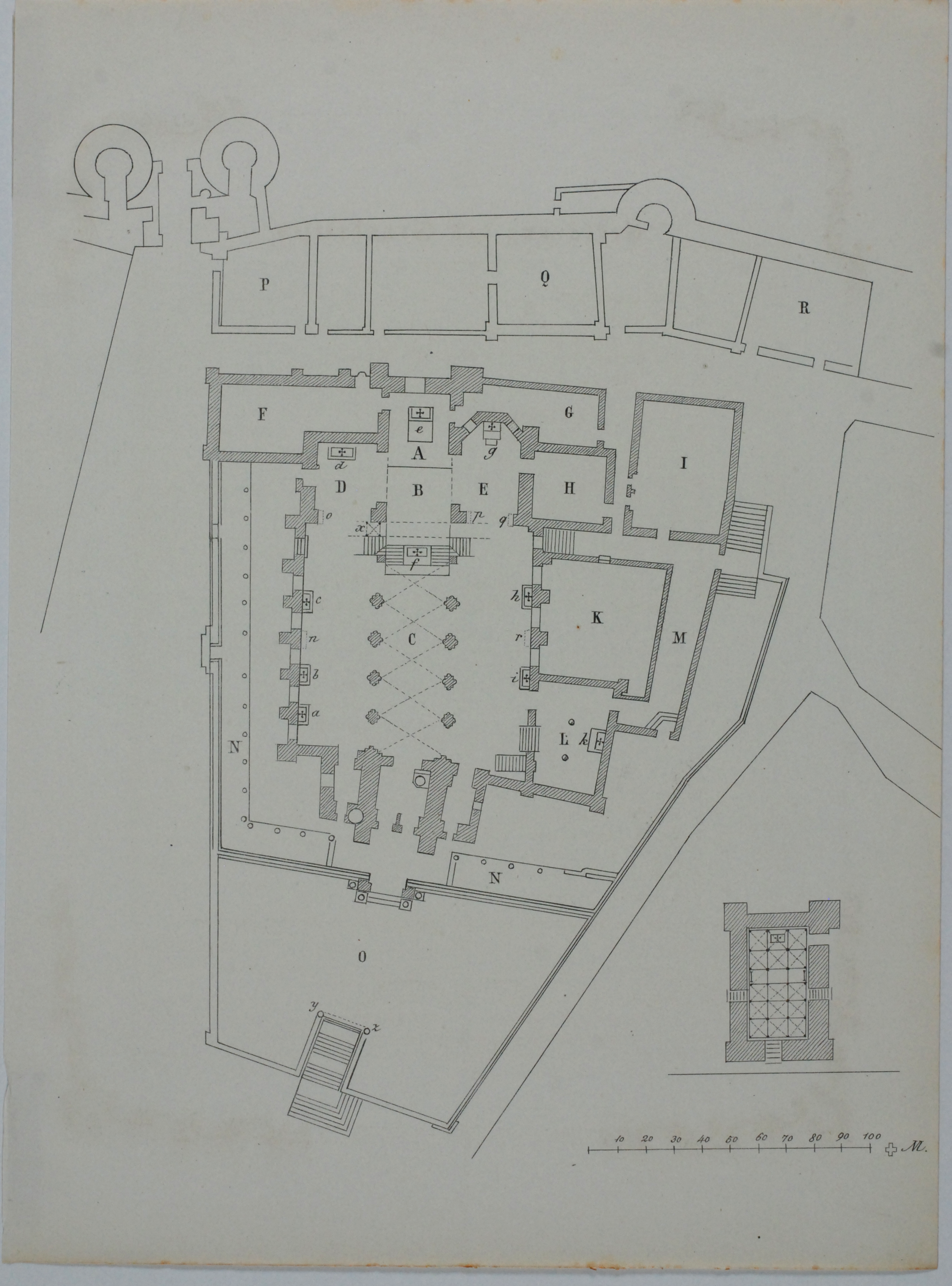
Floorplan of the first church, with the crypt plan to the right.

The first church on the site was built in the Early Middle Ages. St. Ursus of Solothurn was venerated in the city by the 5th century. By 870 there was a college of canons and presumably a collegiate church in Solothurn. A Romanesque church might have existed, but there is no written or archeological evidence to support or refute it. The first documented record of the Gothic church comes from 1294, while the altars were ordained in 1293 and 1298. J.R. Rahn wrote in 1893 that 1294 was the completion date of this church. Hans Rudolf Sennhauser wrote in 1990 that the shape of the crypt was inconsistent with a 1294 construction date. He felt that the two-piece crypt with a double row of pillars was replaced with a single part crypt around 1100. Since the pre-1762 church had a two-piece crypt, he believed it dated from before 1100.

It is likely that the twin towers were damaged in the 1356 Basel earthquake damaged, but there is no reliable sources attesting to the damage. It seems likely, since in 1360 the single Wendelstein tower was built above the church and a gothic facade was added to the west face of the church.

The choir was rebuilt in 1544, while the crypt was re-covered.

The nave was rebuilt in 1644 and widened. The sacristy was extended in 1664.

The college was founded and supported by the Carolingian kings. Originally the canons followed the rules of the Institutio canonicorum Aquisgranensis, where they ate and lived together but could have private dwellings with their Bishop's permission. By the 13th century, the common life rules were given up and the canons became independent. The college of canons were supported by and consisted of foreign nobles, which often caused conflicts with the growing city of Solothurn. In the 14th century, tension rose to a high point, culminating in the 1382 Solothurner Mordnacht (Solothurn murder night). The increasingly indebted Count Rudolf II of Neu-Kyburg prepared to raid Solothurn to force the city to forgive his debts. He arranged with one of the canons, Hans von Stein, to allow Rudolf's forces into the city. However, his plan was discovered by Hans Roth, a farmer from Rumisberg, who warned the city. Angry residents of the city then murdered Hans von Stein in the church during a mass. Rudolf II's attempted raid on Solothurn gave Bern a reason to attack the Counts of Neu-Kyburg and caused the Burgdorferkrieg.

After the Mordnacht, the college began recruiting from the city council and conflicts reduced between the two groups.

In 1519 the Ursus casket with two skeletons were discovered under the chancel altar of the church.

A school is first mentioned in the college in 1208. It remained in operation until 1863, though after the founding of the Jesuit school in Solothurn in 1646, it became less important. The first catalog of the college library was completed in 1424. A choral school was founded in 1585 by the Solothurn patrician Wilhelm Tugginer. The traditional boys' choir was restarted in the 1970s in the cathedral.

By the 18th century the Gothic church was in a poor condition. On 25 March 1762 the Wendelstein tower collapsed forcing the city to begin planning to replace the building.

=== Second church ===
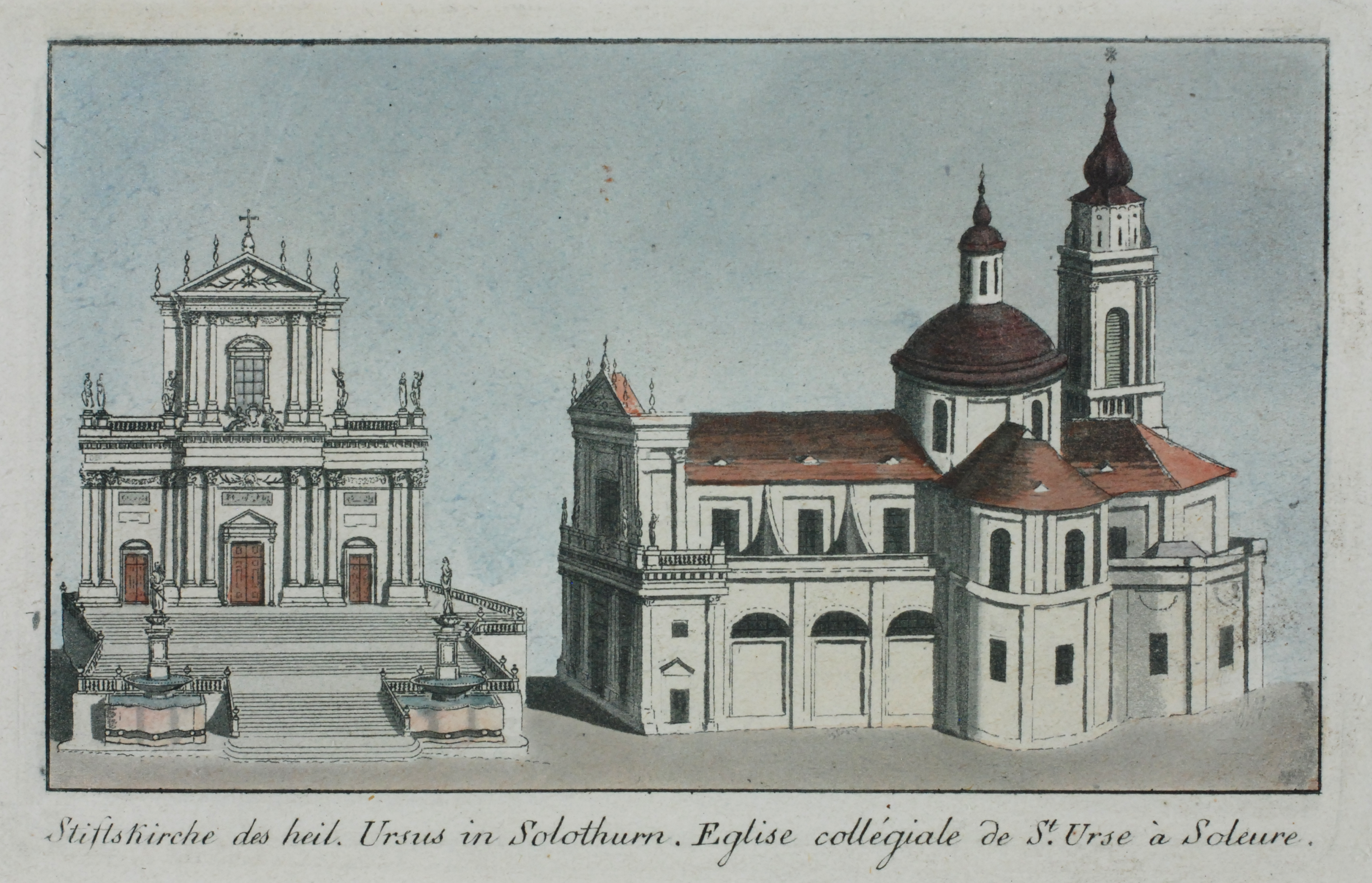
Two views of the church, from 1795–1805

In the following year, the city hired the architect Gaetano Matteo Pisoni (1713–1782) from Ascona to design and build a new church. However, relations between the city and the Ticino architect eventually soured and he was dismissed from the project. His nephew, Paolo Antonio Pisoni (1738–1804), took over construction in 1772. On 26 September 1773 the new church was dedicated by the Bishop of Lausanne, Joseph Niklaus von Montenach. It remained part of the Diocese of Lausanne until 7 May 1828 when Pope Leo XIII reorganized the Diocese of Basel to include Solothurn. The collegiate church was raised to a cathedral and became a Bishop's seat as well as a parish church.

On 11 August 1853, an earthquake lightly damaged the cathedral. It took until 1917 to repair the resulting cracks. During the repair of the cracks, a comprehensive renovation was also carried out and a heating system was installed.

In January 2011, the free-standing altar in the choir and parts of the surrounding church were severely damaged by an arson attack by a 61-year-old Swiss man who had a history of mental illness. The cathedral was closed for about two years for repairs and cleaning. The walls, ceiling and organ all suffered smoke damage and had to be cleaned. The old altar was replaced with a new marble altar. The entire project cost about 8.7 million CHF. The offender was sentenced in September 2011, partly because of another arson attack, to a prison sentence of 14 months without parole. However, due to his mental disorders, he was admitted to a secure psychiatric clinic.

== Building exterior ==
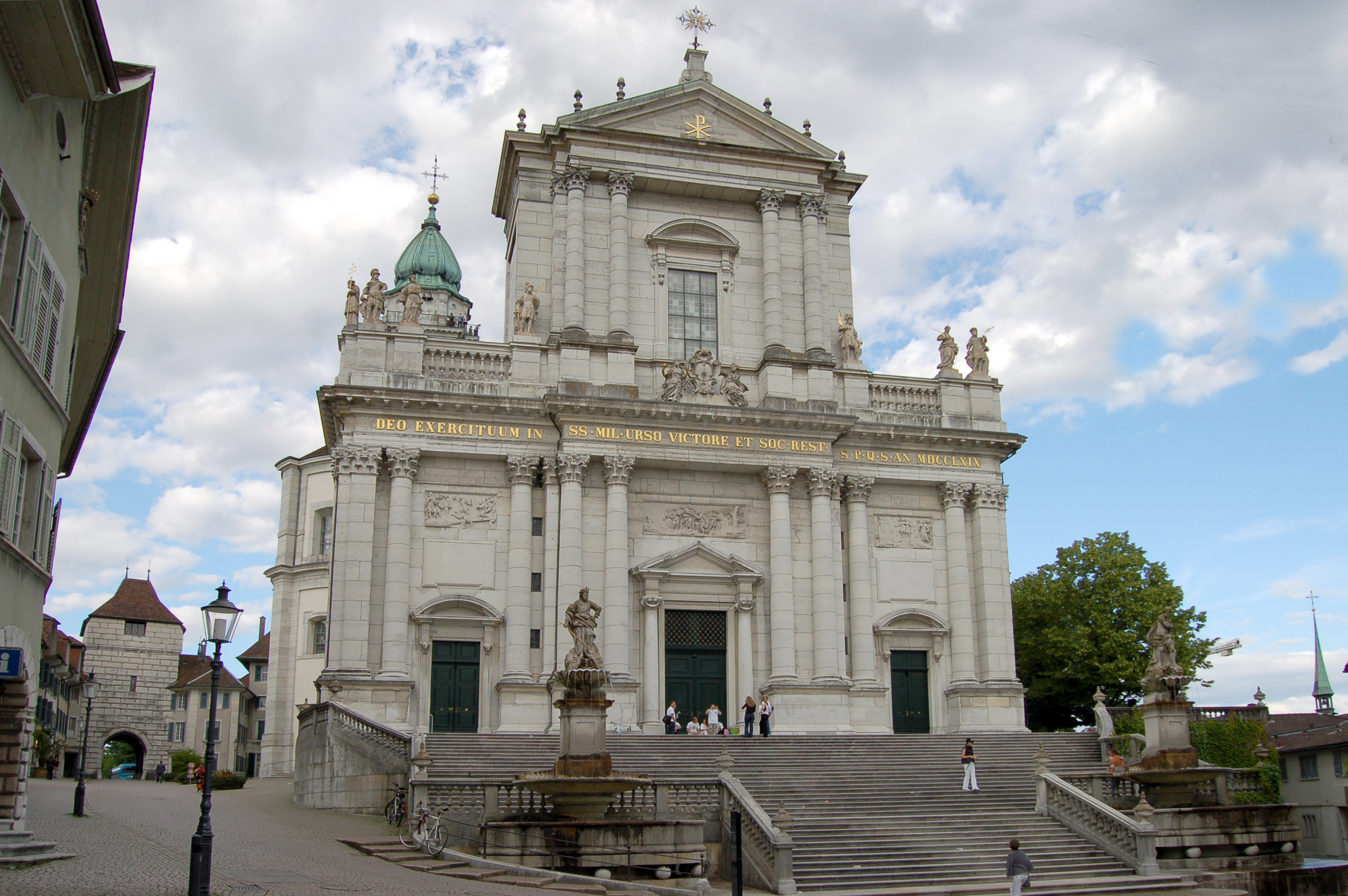
Western facade of the church

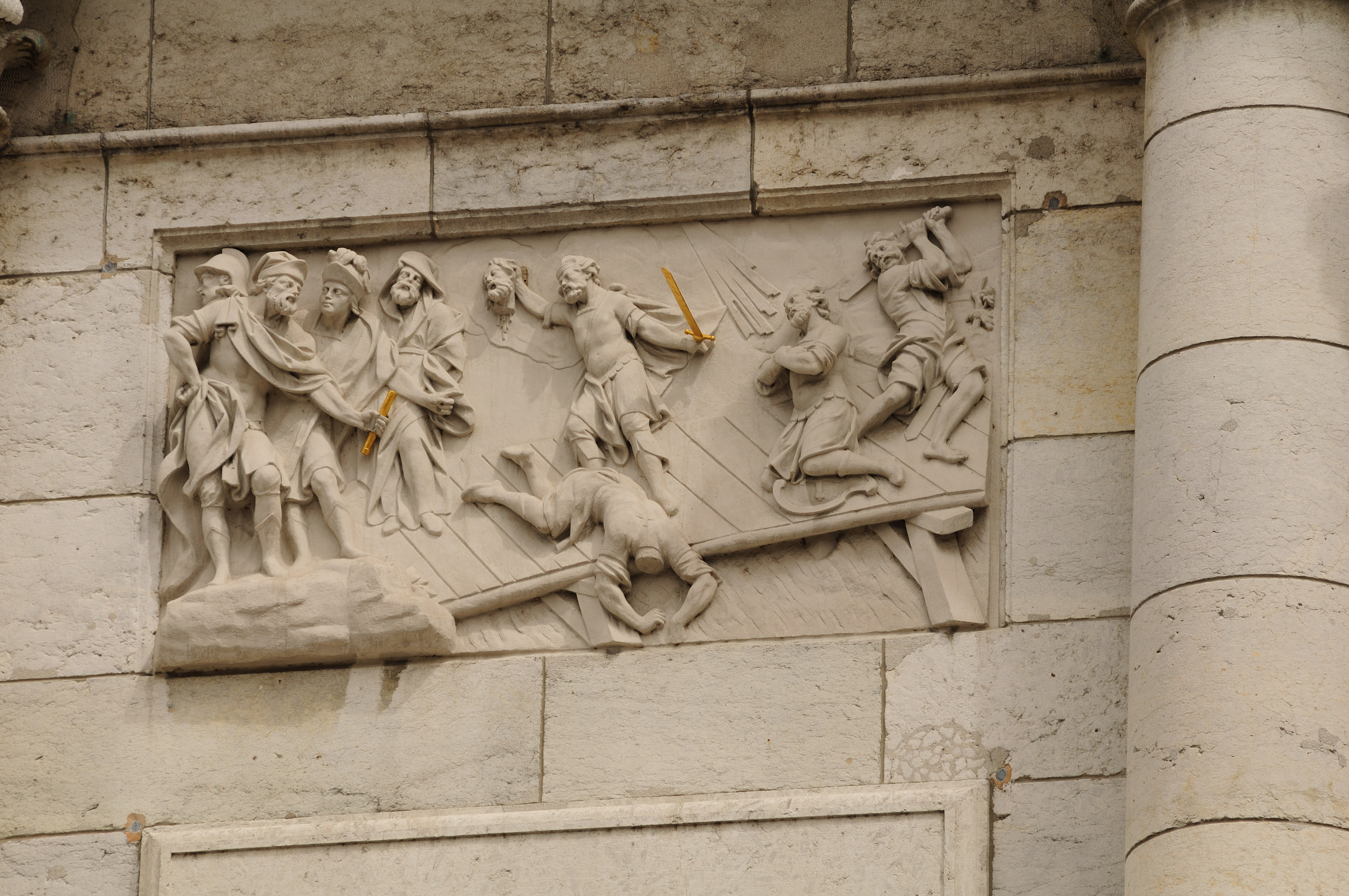
The beheading of the Theban Legion

The western facade of the cathedral is a monumental white stone neoclassical structure. The lower portion is divided into three sections by columns topped with pilasters and entablature. The upper portion is smaller and continues the decoration of columns, pilasters and entablature. The facade is crowned with a triangular pediment as are all of the doors. The front is decorated with monumental statues and reliefs from the sculptor Johann Baptist Babel which were carved in 1774–75. From north to south the figures are St. Stephan, Charles Borromeo, St. Mauritius, St. Verena, St. Victor, St. Ursus, St. Regula, St. Felix, St. Beatus and Niklaus von Flue. In the center is a coat of arms flanked by figures that represent religion and fortitude. The relief on the right shows Saints Ursus and Victor refusing to worship idols. The one on the left shows the beheading of the Theban Legion. The center relief shows St. Peter accepting the keys. The monumental staircase leading to the west facade is flanked by statues of Moses and Gideon atop Roman style fountains.

The single bell tower is located on the north side of the choir and is topped with a copper onion dome. The crossing is crowned with a large copper dome.

== Music ==
=== Organs ===
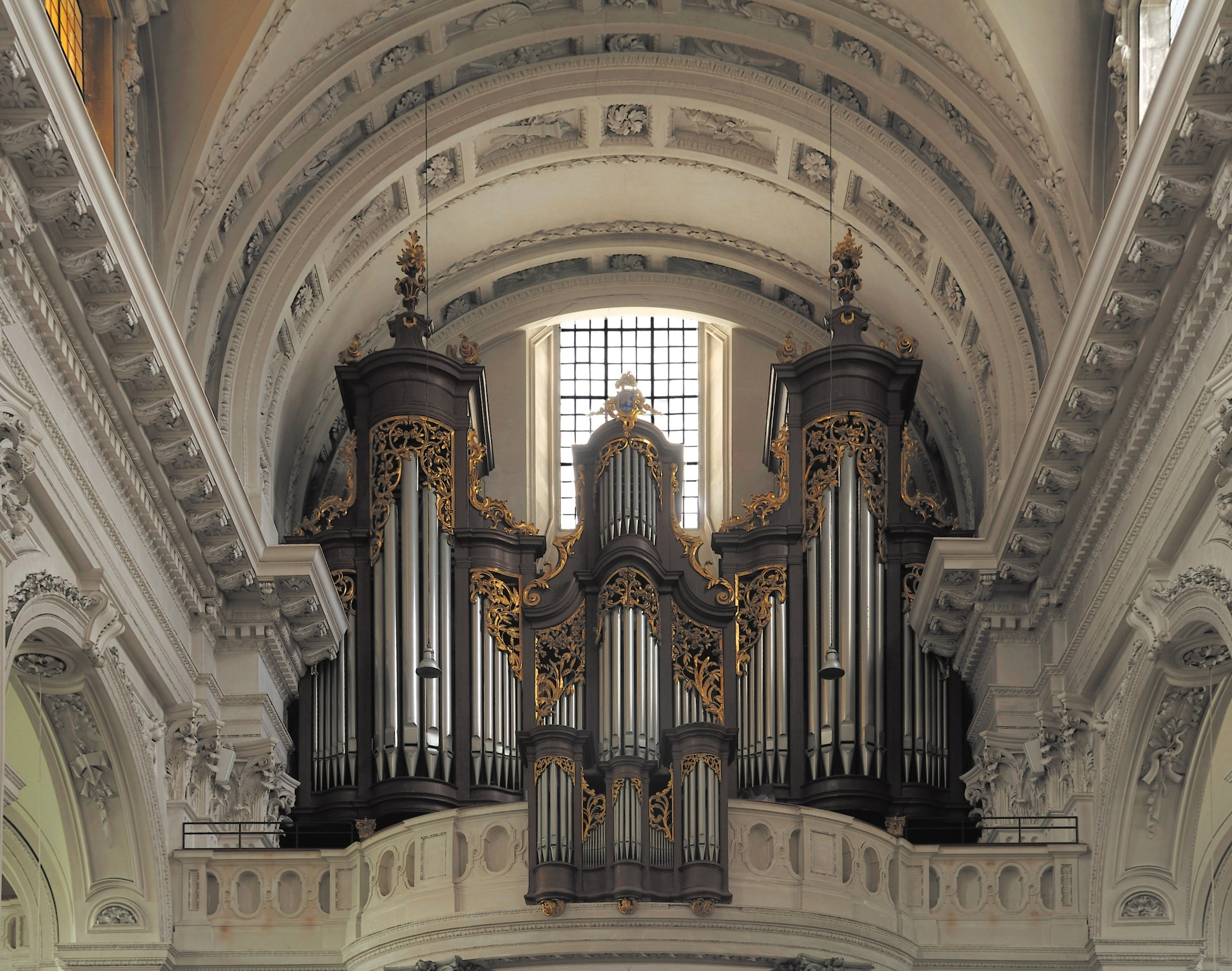
The main organ

The main organ was ordered in 1763 from the organ builder Victor Ferdinand Bosshard (1699–1772) from Baar. It was delivered on 24 April 1772 by his son Karl Josef Maria Bosshard (1736–1795), as his father had died that year. The choir organ was also ordered from Ferdinand Viktor Bosshard and was delivered on 29 September 1772. The original casing of the main and the choir organ are still preserved. However, the organ case in the south transept is a mute.

The main organ was rebuilt in 1942 by Kuhn Organ Builders from the year 1942. In 1975 the organ was rebuilt again, the visible pipes were retained, but the majority of the inner workings were replaced.

I Rückpositiv C–g^{3}
| Suavial | 8’ |
| Gedackt | 8’ |
| Praestant | 4’ |
| Rohrflöte | 4’ |
| Superoktav | 2’ |
| Larigot | 1^{1}/_{3}’ |
| Mixtur IV | 1’ |
| Cornet III | 2^{2}/_{3}’ |
| Krummhorn | 8’ |

II Hauptwerk C–g^{3}
| Principal | 16’ |
| Principal | 8’ |
| Offenflöte | 8’ |
| Gemshorn | 8’ |
| Octav | 4’ |
| Hohlflöte | 4’ |
| Quinte | 2^{2}/_{3}’ |
| Superoctav | 2’ |
| Flageolet | 2’ |
| Mixtur major IV | 2’ |
| Mixtur minor IV-VI | 1’ |
| Fagott | 16’ |
| Corno | 8’ |

III Schwellwerk C–g^{3}
| Gedackt | 16’ |
| Principal | 8’ |
| Hohlflöte | 8’ |
| Salicional | 8’ |
| Unda maris | 8' |
| Octav | 4’ |
| Nachthorn | 4’ |
| Quinte | 2^{2}/_{3}’ |
| Waldflöte | 2’ |
| Terz | 1^{3}/_{5}’ |
| Scharf VI-VIII | 1^{1}/_{3}’ |
| Zimbel IV | ^{1}/_{2}’ |
| Trompette harm. | 8’ |
| Oboe | 8’ |
| Clairon | 4’ |
Tremolo

IV Kronpositiv C–g^{3}
| Rohrflöte | 8’ |
| Spitzflöte | 8’ |
| Dolcan | 4’ |
| Gedacktflöte | 4' |
| Flageolet | 2’ |
| Oktav | 1’ |
| Mixtur IV | 1’ |
| Schalmey | 8’ |
Tremolo

Pedal C–a^{1}
| Principalbass | 16' |
| Subbass | 16’ |
| Gedackt | 16’ |
| Principal | 8’ |
| Spillflöte | 8’ |
| Octav | 4’ |
| Gedackt-Flöte | 4’ |
| Mixtur IV | 2^{2}/_{3}’ |
| Posaune | 16’ |
| Trompete | 8’ |
| Clairon | 4’ |

- Couplers: I/II, III/I, III/II, IV/II, IV/III, I/P II/P III/P IV/P

The smaller choir organ was ordered in 1773 from the organ builder Carl Joseph Maria Bossart. It was rebuilt in 1973 by Metzler Orgelbau. Today the organ has 12 stops on one manual. The pedal is attached and has no register.

Manualwerk C–c^{3}
| Principal | 8’ |
| Coppel | 8’ |
| Viola di gamba | 8’ |
| Octav | 4’ |

(Fortsetzung)
| Flauto | 4’ |
| Quinta | 2^{2}/_{3}’ |
| Superoctav | 2’ |
| Flageolet | 2’ |

(Fortsetzung)
| Larigot | 1^{1}/_{3}’ |
| Tertia | 1^{3}/_{5}’ |
| Mixtur III | 2’ |
| Sesquialtera III | 1^{1}/_{3}’ |

=== Choir ===
The Boys Choir of St Ursus Cathedral in Solothurn is the oldest boys choir in Switzerland, with its origins in the collegiate church of St. Ursenstift founded in 742. The choir contains around 60 boys and men, with the boys attending local schools.

== Bells ==
| No. | Name | Year | Caster | Mass in kg (Zentner/Pfund) | Note 1923 | Patronage (1793) | Notes |
|---|---|---|---|---|---|---|---|
| 1 | Grosse Glocke auch Angst- und Sturmglocke | 1766 | Gebrüder Jost und Joseph Kaiser; Zug | 4075 (81/50) | as^{0} | Maria, St. Urs | |
| 2 | Grosse Predigtglocke | 1766 | Gebrüder Jost und Joseph Kaiser; Zug | 2764 (55/28) | b^{0} | Victor, Matthew, Mark, Luke John | |
| 3 | Kleine Predigt- und Stundglocke | 1767 | Gebrüder Jost und Joseph Kaiser; Zug | 1942 (38/84) | c^{1} | Gregory, Ambrosius, Augustine, Hieronymus | |
| 4 | Wochensegen- Praesenz oder St. Annaglocke | 1767 | Gebrüder Jost und Joseph Kaiser; Zug | 1559 (31/19) | des^{1} | Anne, Joseph, Mauritius | |
| 5 | Englisch Gruss- und Wandlungsglocke | 1767 | Gebrüder Jost und Joseph Kaiser; Zug | 1054 (21/9) | es^{1} | Maria, Gabriel | |
| 6 | Rosenkranzglocke | 1767 | Gebrüder Jost und Joseph Kaiser; Zug | 756 (15/13) | f^{1} | Maria vom hl. Rosenkranz | |
| 7 | End- und Kinderlehrglocke | 1767 | Gebrüder Jost und Joseph Kaiser; Zug | 527 (10/55) | g^{1} | Michael, Barbara | |
| 8 | Sebastians- und Spendeglocke | 1768 | Gebrüder Jost und Joseph Kaiser; Zug | 436 (8/73) | as^{1} | Sebastian, Martin, Elisabeth | |
| 9 | Die grosse Vesperglocke | 1768 | Gebrüder Jost und Joseph Kaiser; Zug | 212 (4/24) | c^{2} | Ursus, Victor | |
| 10 | Kleine Vesperglocke | 1768 | Gebrüder Jost und Joseph Kaiser; Zug | ? (2/42) | (es^{2}) | Maria, John the Baptist | 1901 recast |
| 10a | Kleine Vesperglocke | 1901 | Gebr. Rüetschi, Aarau | 121 (?) | es^{2} | | |
| 11 | Messglöcklein | 1768 | Gebrüder Jost und Joseph Kaiser; Zug | 51 (1/3) | as^{2} | Das allerheiligste Altasakrament | |
