= Sacrosanctity =

Roman declaration of inviolability or sacredness

Sacrosanctity (Latin: sacrosanctitas, lit. 'sacred sanctity') or inviolability is the declaration of physical inviolability of a place (particularly temples and city walls), a sacred object, or a person. Under Roman law, this was established through sacred law (lex sacrata), which had religious connotations. Festus explained that: “Sacred laws are laws which have the sanction that anyone who broke them becomes accursed to one of the gods, together with his family and property”. In some cases the law may have been applied to protect temples from being defiled. It could also be applied to protect a person who was declared sacrosanct (inviolable). Those who harmed a sacrosanct person became sacer (accursed) through the declaration sacer esto! ("Let him be accursed"). The offender was considered as having harmed the gods or a god, as well as the sacrosanct person and therefore accursed to the gods or a god. This meant that the offender became forfeit to the god(s) and on his death he was surrendered to the god(s) in question. The implication was that anyone who killed him was considered as performing a sacred duty and enjoyed impunity.

== History ==
Within Roman literature itself, the term sacrosanctitas is usually found in relation to the tribune of the Plebs, plebeian tribune, or the Roman emperors who appropriated the tribunician power in large part because of its ritual protection.

During the rebellion of the first plebeian secession in 494 BC, which marked the beginning of the Conflict of the Orders between patricians (the aristocrats) and plebeians (the commoners), the plebeian movement instituted and elected its leaders, who soon also came to act as the representatives of the plebs: the plebeian tribunes. It also instituted the assistants of these tribunes (the plebeian aediles) and its own assembly, the Plebeian Council (Concilium Plebis). These plebeian institutions were extra-legal in that they were not recognised by the senate and the Roman state, which were controlled by the patricians. The bones of contention in the Conflict of the Orders were the economic grievances of the poor, the protection of plebeians and, later, power-sharing with the patricians (who monopolised political power) with the rich plebeians. The patricians resisted the plebeian movement and its demands because the interests of the plebeians most often clashed with theirs and they saw this movement as a threat to their political and economic privileges.

The first plebeian secession was spontaneous and was the result of the exasperation of the plebeians with the refusal of the senate to address their demands. They lost faith in the Roman state. After the rebellion the disaffected plebeians effectively created a “state within the state.” Livy said that “Two states were created out of one; each faction had its own magistrates [officials]; its own laws.” The plebeians turned the Aventine Hill into their stronghold and their own jurisdiction in contraposition to the Roman state. The Plebeian Council, under the leadership of the plebeian tribunes, who presided over its sessions, voted on and issued its own laws which applied to this hill and to the plebeians. The patricians did not recognise these plebeian resolutions as laws because they refused to recognise the plebeian movement. Moreover, formally, legislation was supposed to be proposed by the consuls (the two annually elected heads of the Republic) and put to the vote of the Comitia Centuriata, the Assembly of the Soldiers.

Given the extra-legal character of the plebeian institutions, the plebeians found a way to give power to the plebeian tribunes by using the lex sacrata and declaring the person of a plebeian tribune sacrosanct. The lex sacrata was a collective resolution sanctioned by a collective oath. It was found among other Italic people as a military arrangement whereby, at times of military emergency, the compulsorily levied soldiers swore to follow their commanders to the death. The plebeians swore to obey the plebeian tribunes they elected and to defend them to the death. Those who harmed them became sacer. Given that the plebeian tribunes were not part of the Roman state and had no secular legal status, the threat to kill those who harmed them by the plebeians formed the base from which the powers of the plebeian tribunes were derived. The invocation of a religious law provided the justification and sacrosanctity conferred impunity. These tribunes provided protection from arbitrary coercion by public officials though auxilium (assistance) by personal intervention to stop the action. They also could use coercitio, the enforcement of their will by coercion through which they could impose fines, imprisonment or the death penalty on anyone who challenged them or abused them verbally or assaulted them. Later, as the Conflict of the Orders was resolved, the sacrosanct character of the plebeian tribunes or, as they also came to be known, Tribunes of the Plebs was accepted by the patricians and implemented into Roman law.
