= Chiaffredo =

Patron saint of Saluzzo, Italy

Saint Chiaffredo
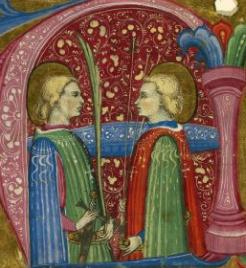
- Miniature of Saints Maurice and Theofredus (Chiaffredo), attributed to Frate Nebridio da Cremona, c. 1460–1480

Martyr
- Born: Egypt
- Died: 286; Crissolo, Italy
- Venerated in: Coptic Orthodox Church; Eastern Orthodox Churches; Oriental Orthodox Churches; Roman Catholic Church
- Major shrine: Crissolo; Saluzzo
- Feast: September 7
- Attributes: military attire; sword; standard of red Mauritian cross on white field; elm tree; horse
- Patronage: Saluzzo

Chiaffredo (also Chiaffredus, Theofredus, Ciafrè, Chaffre, Teofredo, Jafredo, Jafredus, Eufredus, Jofredus, Sinfredus, Zaffredus) is venerated as the patron saint of Saluzzo, Italy.

Tradition considers him a member of the Theban Legion, but instead of being martyred with this legion at Agaunum (in present-day Switzerland), he escaped to Piedmont and was martyred there.

A 14th-century account relates that, around 522, a man fell from a precipice near Crissolo but remained unharmed. The local population attributed his being unharmed to relics discovered by a peasant plowing in the vicinity - a discovery attributed to divine intervention. The mysterious skeleton was given the name of “San Ciafrè” and the tomb became the focus of a celebrated sanctuary at Crissolo.

The first documentary evidence pointing to a cult devoted to Chiaffredo dates from 1387, when Avignon Pope Clement VII granted indulgences to those who visited the church at Crissolo and helped in its repair. A late 16th century legend written down by Guglielmo Baldesano states that Chiaffredo or Teofredo, soldier of the Theban Legion, escaped to Piedmont to avoid sacrificing to pagan idols and was martyred at Crissolo around 270. Fabio Arduino believes this story to have no historical foundation, as it would have been unlikely for a Roman legionary of the 3rd century to bear such a clearly Germanic name. The name is a variant of Theudofridus, derived from the Germanic theuda- "people," and frithu- "peace."

The sepulcher identified as Chiaffredo's burial place may have been a tomb of pagan origins. Similar to the cults of Constantius at Crissolo, Bessus at Val Soana, Tegulus at Ivrea, Magnus at Castelmagno, and Dalmatius at Borgo San Dalmazzo, the cult of Chiaffredo was linked with that of the Theban Legion to lend antiquity to a local saint about whom nothing was really known.

In 1902, a scholar identified Chiaffredo as the 8th century figure Theofredus (Chaffre, Theofrid, Teofredo), abbot of Le Monastier near Puy-en-Velay, who was killed by Muslim raiders and was also venerated in Piedmont.

Tornabuoni, bishop of Saluzzo, declared Chiaffredo patron of his diocese during a synod of 1516, with Constantius (San Costanzo) as co-patron. Chiaffredo's relics were translated to Revello in 1593, and thence to the cathedral of Saluzzo in 1642. Constantius and Chiaffredo are depicted together in the altar of Saluzzo Cathedral.

Chiaffredo enjoyed veneration in Piedmont; one English scholar has written that “beneath the shadow of Monte Viso, San Chiaffredo, a runaway apostle of the Theban legion, has usurped the worship paid in old time to the river-god Eridanus..."

Due to his alleged Theban origins, he is venerated by the Coptic Church. He is however, not mentioned explicitly in the Roman Martyrology, although this martyrology includes Maurice and the Theban Legion as a whole, without naming Chiaffredo specifically.
