= Magnus of Cuneo =

Late 3rd century Roman saint

Saint Magnus of Cuneo
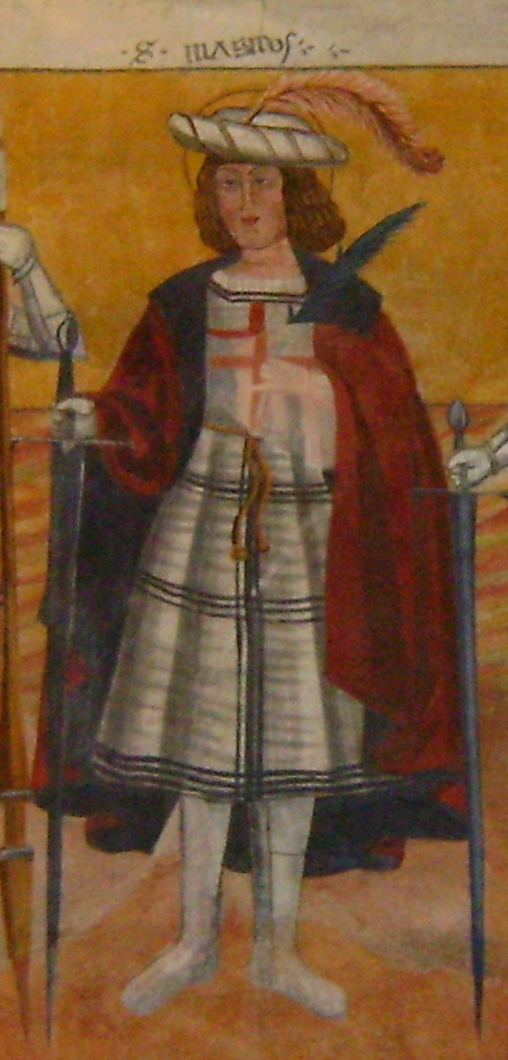
- Died: 3rd century?
- Venerated in: Roman Catholic Church
- Major shrine: Santuario di San Magno, Castelmagno, Italy
- Feast: August 19
- Attributes: depicted as a soldier bearing a banner and the palm of martyrdom
- Patronage: protection over pastures and livestock

Magnus of Cuneo (Italian: San Magno) is venerated as a martyr and member of the legendary Theban Legion. The center of his cult is situated at the mountain sanctuary known as the Santuario di San Magno, in the Valle Grana, Castelmagno, in the province of Cuneo. His feast day is August 19.

== Legend ==
Local tradition says he was a soldier of the Theban Legion, which had been commanded by Maurice. The legion is supposed to have been decimated at Agaunum in 286 AD, but Magnus fled to the mountains of Piedmont, preaching the Christian religion in the Alps. He was eventually martyred and buried in the spot now occupied by the Santuario di San Magno. The church may have occupied a spot once dedicated to the Roman god Mars. The current church was built between 1704 and 1716, in Piedmontese Baroque style, though its interior still preserves frescoes of the 15th and 16th centuries.

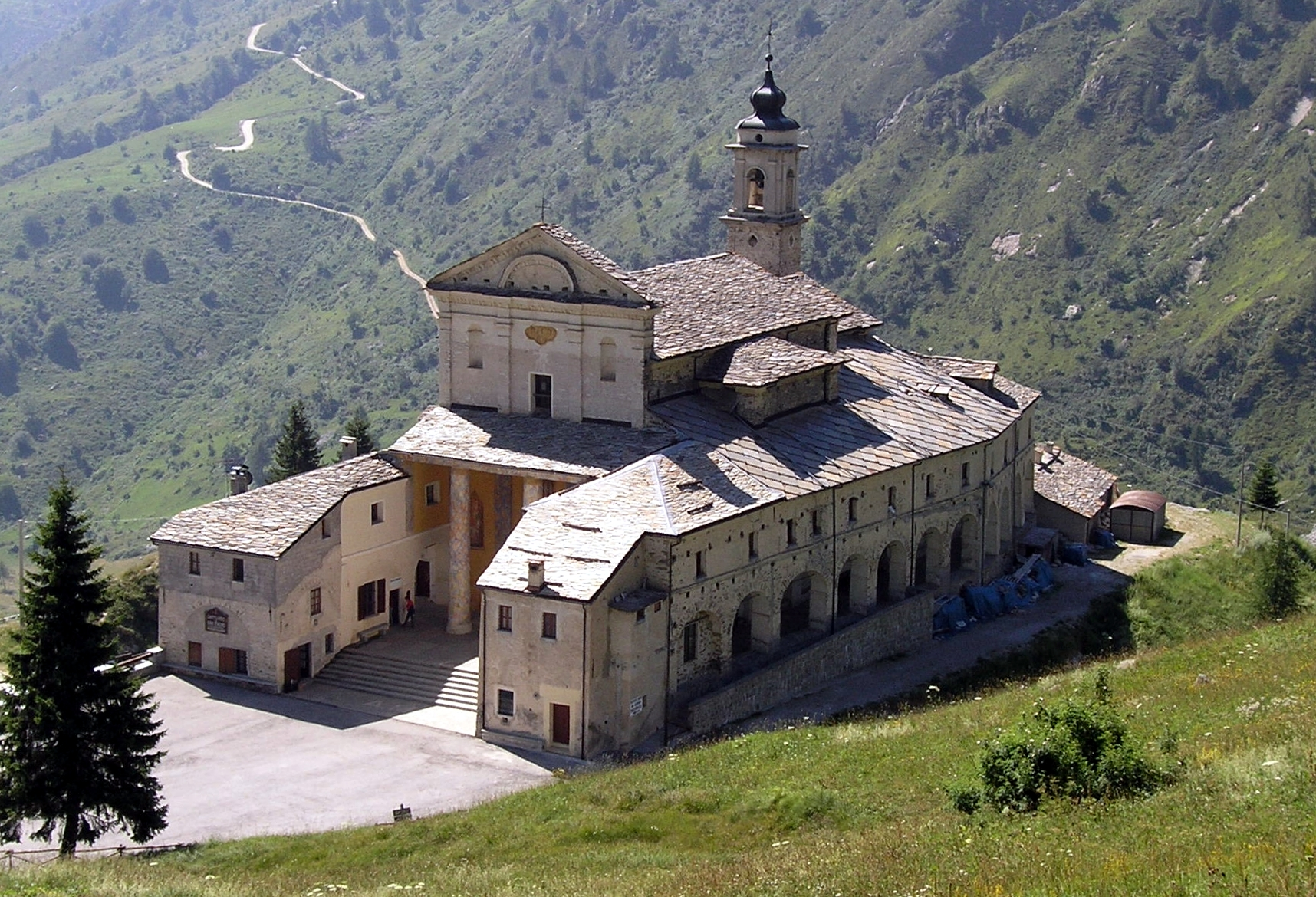
Santuario di San Magno

As Damiano Pomi points out, neither documentary nor archaeological evidence supports the connection between Magnus and the Theban Legion. Similar to the cults of Chiaffredo at Crissolo, Bessus at Val Soana, Tegulus at Ivrea, Constantius at Villar San Costanzo, and Dalmatius at Borgo San Dalmazzo, the cult of Magnus was linked with that of the Theban Legion to lend antiquity to a local saint about whom nothing was really known.

Magnus has theoretically been identified with Magnus of Füssen (Mang), a later monk of the same name associated with the Bavarian monastery at Füssen, whose cult would have spread south to Piedmont by the Benedictines. However, due to his association with the Theban Legion, Magnus was depicted as a Roman soldier holding a banner and the palm of martyrdom. He should not be confused with Magnus of Anagni or Magnus of Cappadocia, whose feast days occur on the same day. A set of relics, translated from Anagni to St. Martin of Tours Catholic Church in Louisville, Kentucky in 1901, may belong to one of them.
