= Constantius (Theban Legion) =

Christian saint and supposed 3rd-century Roman soldier

Saint Constantius and Companions
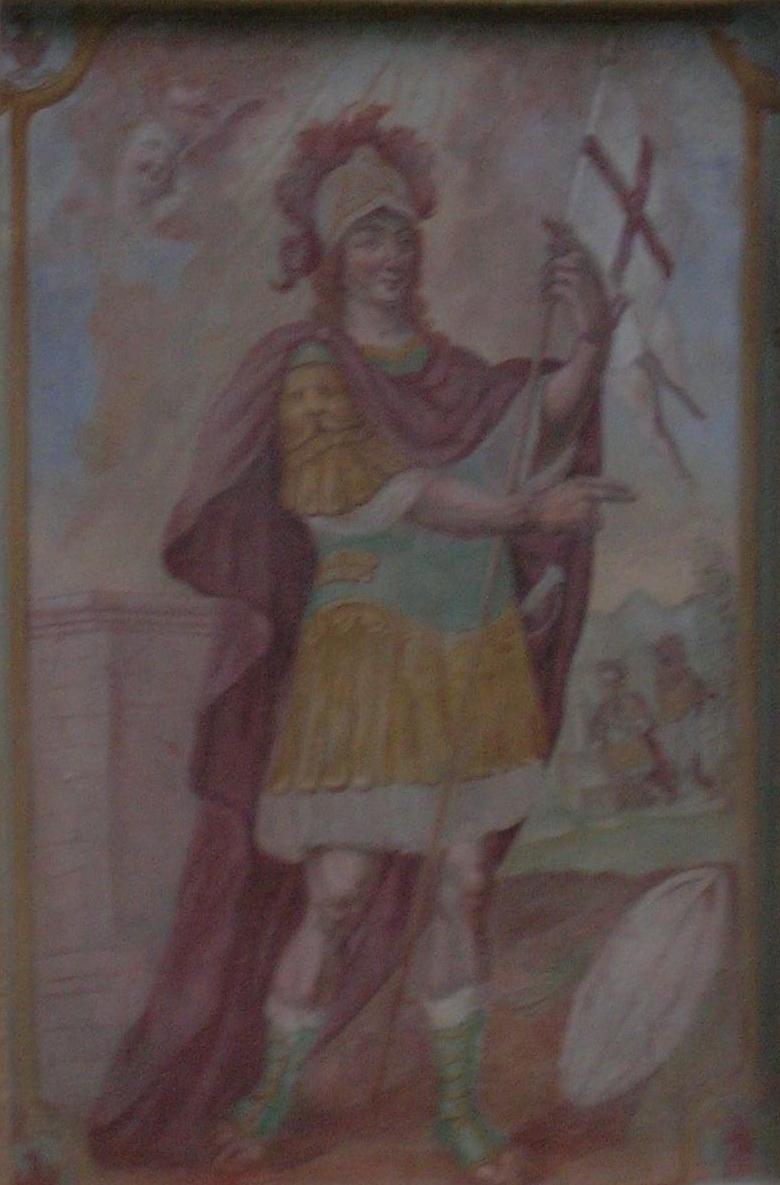
- 12th century depiction of Constantius, façade of Santuario di San Costanzo al Monte.

Martyrs
- Born: Egypt
- Died: 286; Villar San Costanzo, province of Cuneo, Italy
- Venerated in: Roman Catholic Church; Oriental Orthodoxy
- Major shrine: Villar San Costanzo
- Feast: September 18
- Attributes: depicted as a soldier bearing a banner with the Mauritian Cross and the palm of martyrdom; spade
- Patronage: Villar San Costanzo; diocese of Saluzzo (with Chiaffredo)

Constantius (Italian: San Costanzo) is venerated as a member of the legendary Theban Legion. Similar to the cults of Chiaffredo at Crissolo, Bessus at Val Soana, Tegulus at Ivrea, Magnus at Castelmagno, and Dalmatius at Borgo San Dalmazzo, the cult of Constantius was linked with that of the Theban Legion to lend antiquity to a local saint about whom nothing was really known.

According to tradition, Constantius survived the decimation of his Legion and fled to the Val Maira, today in the province of Cuneo, with some other survivors. These included Constantine, Dalmatius, Desiderius, Isidore, Magnus, Olympius, Pontius, Theodore, and Victor. They dedicated themselves to preaching the Christian religion, but all of them, except for Constantius, were soon killed by the Roman authorities. Constantius buried his companions.

The local geologic formation known as Ciciu del Villar, which are columns formed by natural erosion, was connected with Constantius' legend: the stones are said to be the Roman soldiers sent to kill him, who were miraculously petrified before they could harm the saint.

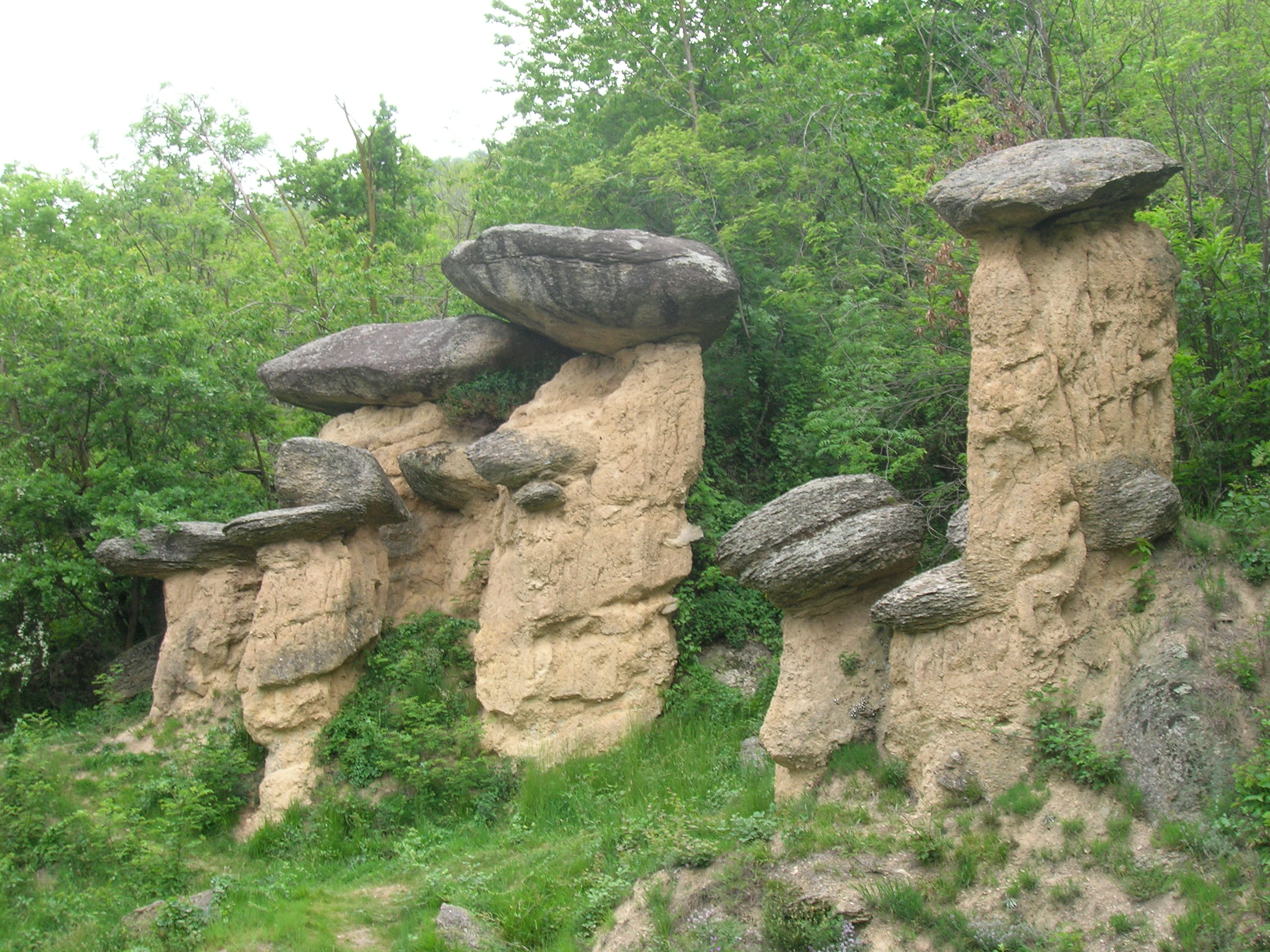
The columns of Ciciu del Villar

According to tradition, Constantius was eventually beheaded on Monte San Bernardo, where a sanctuary dedicated to him was built, known as San Costanzo al Monte. This sanctuary probably dates to Lombard times; some eighth century sculptures remain. The sanctuary was rebuilt and altered in succeeding centuries, and the stone church was completed in 1190. A Baroque façade was added later. The Benedictine abbatial church of Santi Vittore e Costanzo, also in Villar, conserves some important archaeological remains, including a marble slab bearing vermilion symbols and worn down by the hands of the faithful.

Constantius' cult became popular, with a pilgrimage to Villar by the faithful taking place every year.

Tornabuoni, bishop of Saluzzo, declared Chiaffredo patron of his diocese during a synod of 1516, with Constantius as co-patron. Statues of Chiaffredo and Constantius can be found in the altar of the cathedral of Saluzzo. Due to his connection with the Theban Legion, Constantius is considered to have been of Egyptian birth; this has led to his veneration in the Coptic Church.
