= Fortunatus of Casei =

Swiss Catholic saint

Saint Fortunatus of Casei

Martyr
- Born: Africa
- Died: 286 AD; Agaunum, Switzerland
- Venerated in: Roman Catholic Church; Eastern Orthodox Church
- Major shrine: Casei Gerola
- Feast: October 16 (and third Sunday in October)
- Attributes: Military attire; or depicted as a bishop
- Patronage: Casei Gerola; Pantelleria

Fortunatus of Casei (Italian: San Fortunato di Casei) is venerated as a saint by the Catholic Church. Tradition makes him a member of the Theban Legion, and thus martyred at Agaunum. However, his relics were situated in the catacombs of Pope Callixtus I in Rome until 1746, when Cardinal Guadagni, Roman vicar to Benedict XIV, re-exhumed and displayed Fortunatus’ relics in the collegiate church of Santa Maria in Via Lata in Rome. It is unclear how the relics of Fortunatus reached Rome from the saint's supposed place of death in the Swiss Alps.

From Santa Maria in Via Lata, Fortunatus' relics were translated to Casei Gerola in 1765, as a gift to the church there from the Holy See. Casei Gerola, in the province of Pavia, was an important village of the diocese of Tortona, which had close ties to the papacy. His relics were kept in an urn; Fortunatus' skull was crushed, indicating the cause of death to be a fatal blow to the head.

Another source states that he was venerated in the catacombs of Saint Priscilla in Rome until 1600, when some of his relics were translated to Turbigo, although his relics were also claimed by Casei from 1700 onwards. There may have been two saints with the same name of Fortunatus. Some of his relics are also claimed by the parish of Lonate Pozzolo.

He was proclaimed patron saint of Pantelleria after he is believed to have aided the island through miraculous intervention during an earthquake in 1831 and a seaquake in 1891. A procession in honor of the saint is held on October 16; a statue of the saint is carried on a boat.
