= Theofrid =

Theofrid or Thiofrid (German: Theofried, French: Théofroy) may refer to:

- Theofrid (abbot of Corbie) (died 690)
- Theofrid of Orange (died 732)
- Thiofrid of Echternach (died 1110)
