= Theofrid of Orange =

Saint Theofrid of Orange

Martyr
- Born: Orange, Vaucluse, France
- Died: 728 or 732 AD near Le Monastier-sur-Gazeille, France
- Venerated in: Roman Catholic Church
- Feast: November 18; October 19

Theofrid (Chaffre, Theofredus, Theofred, Théofroy) of Orange (or of Carmery) (d. 728 or 732 AD) was an abbot of Calmeliac or Carmery-en-Velay (later called Saint-Chaffre, and today Le Monastier-sur-Gazeille), which is situated near Le Puy-en-Velay and was founded by Calminius.

A native of Orange, he joined his uncle Eudon, the first abbot of Calmeliac. Theofrid is venerated as a martyr, as Christian tradition holds that he was killed by Muslim raiders who had crossed into southern France.

Tradition states that the circumstances of his death are as follows: when the raiders neared Calmeliac, Theofrid ordered the other monks to hide in the forest. He remained near the monastery and was found in prayer, and was dragged away and mortally wounded in the head with a stone.

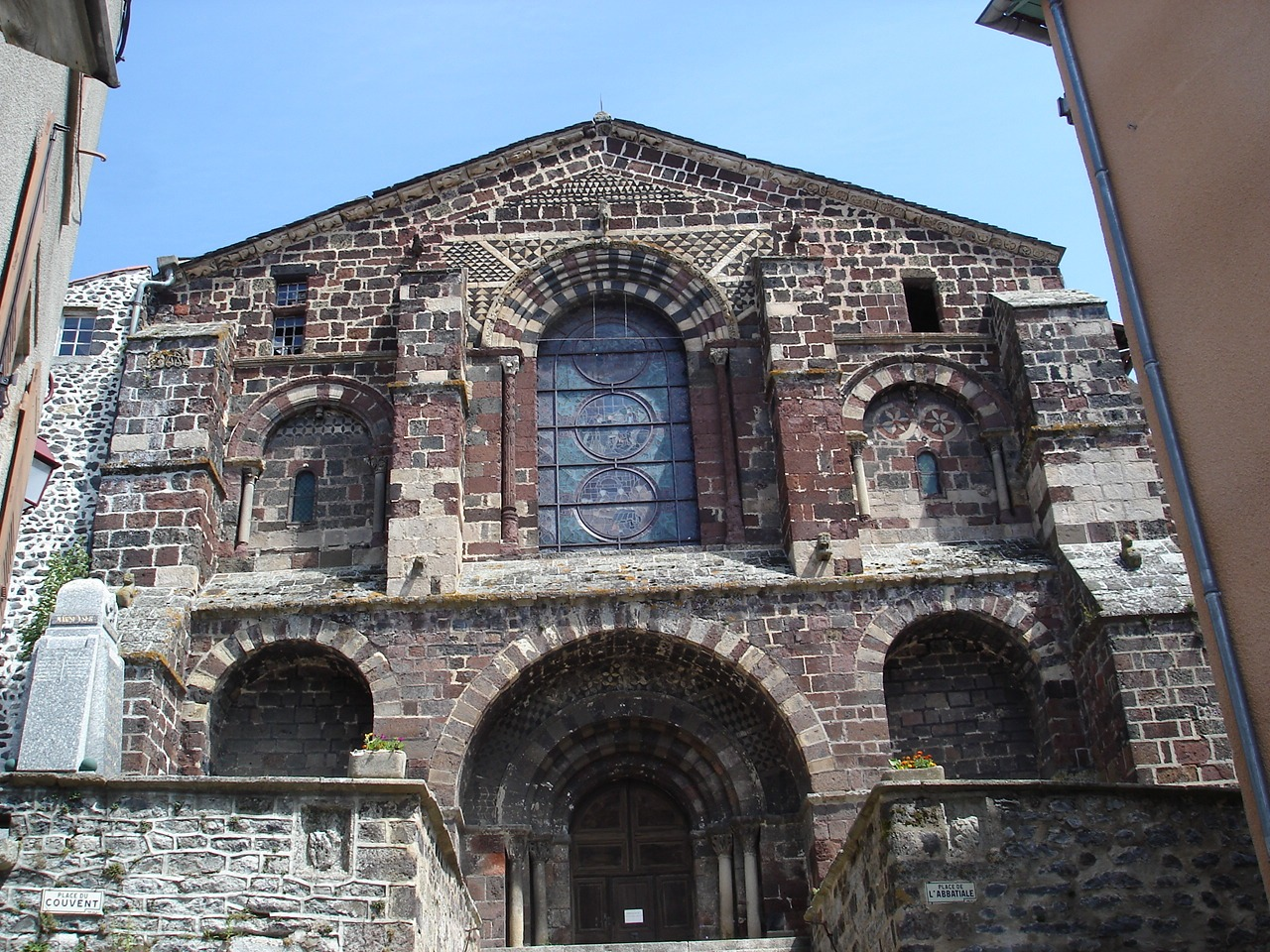
Abbey Church of Saint-Chaffre, Le Monastier-sur-Gazeille.

The legend further states that after Theofrid fell to the ground, the earth shook and a dark storm cloud unleashed lightning, hail, and winds that dispersed the raiders. Theofrid died seven days later.

== Veneration ==
His cult spread in Southern France during the 11th century. In Piedmont, his cult was confused with that of the legendary member of the Theban Legion, Chiaffredo (Theofredus, Teofredo). Holweck says Theofrid is "identical with S. Teofredo of Joffredo (Gioffredo), patron of Cervera and Cherasco in Piedmont."
