= Attilio =

Italian Roman Catholic saint

Attilio, one of the legendary martyrs of the Theban Legion, is venerated as a saint in the area of Trino Vercellese, in Piedmont, north-west Italy and commemorated on 28 June. However his cult is no longer officially recognized by the Roman Catholic Church and he has no entry in its current martyrologies.

He has been depicted with a flag, a helmet and the palm of martyrdom.
