= Robert Hertz =

French sociologist

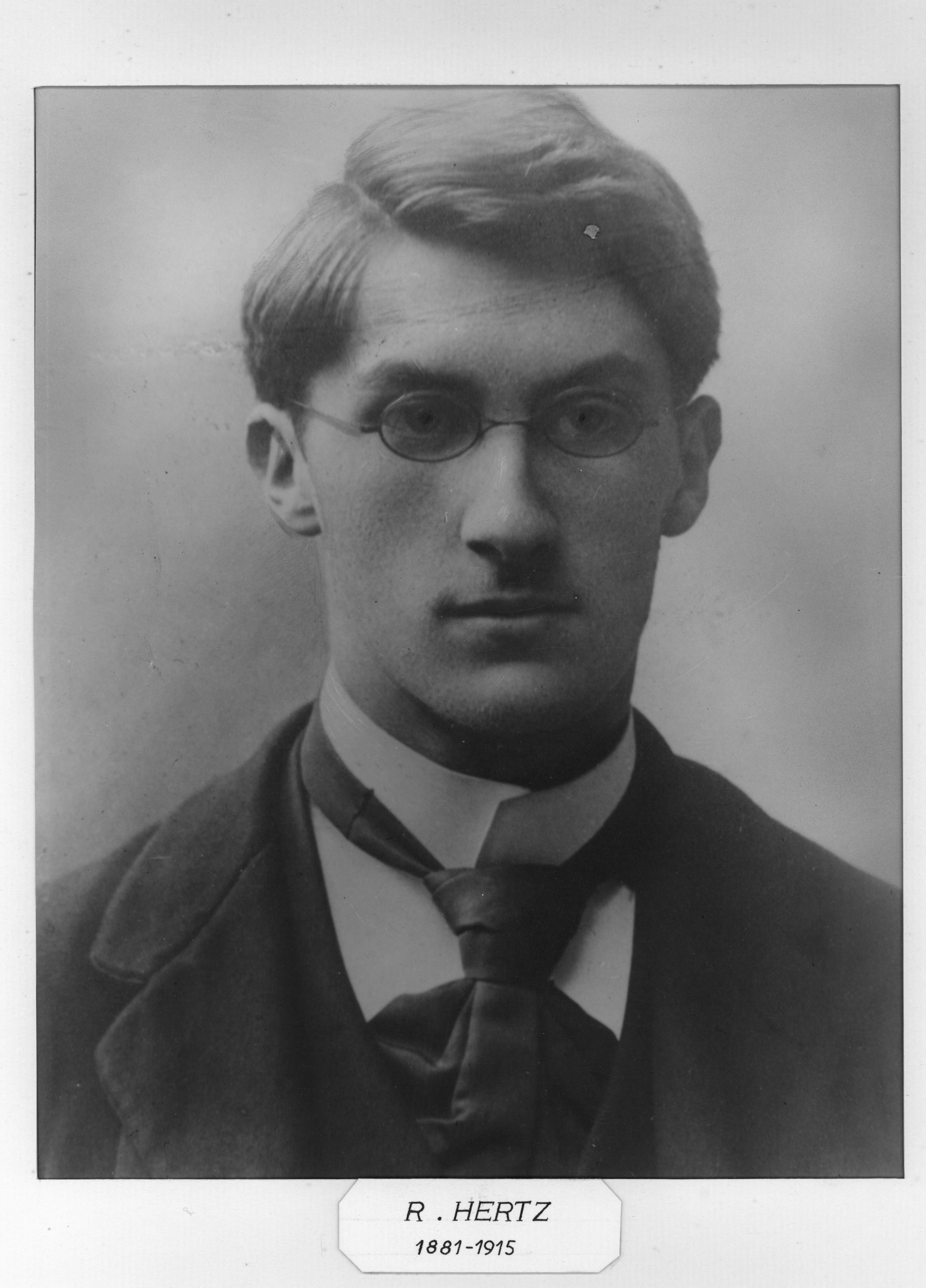
Robert Hertz (1900).

Robert Hertz (22 June 1881 in Saint-Cloud, Hauts-de-Seine – 13 April 1915 in Marchéville, Meuse) was a French sociologist who was killed in active service during World War I.

Hertz was a student at the École Normale Supérieure, from which he aggregated in philosophy in 1904, finishing first in his class. After a brief period of study in England at the British Museum he returned to France, where he began doctoral work with Émile Durkheim and Marcel Mauss. An important member of the Annee Sociologique team, his specialty was the sociology of religion.

Hertz is most known for his early papers A Contribution to the Study of the Collective Representation of Death (1907) and The Pre-Eminence of the Right Hand: a Study in Religious Polarity (1909); both later translated into English as Death and the Right Hand by Rodney and Claudia Needham (in 1960). Hertz's work influenced Edward Evan Evans-Pritchard, and many consider it to be a precursor to Claude Lévi-Strauss's structuralism. The following quote from Death and the Right Hand often appears in anthropological articles even today, such as Richard Robbins's The Cultural Construction of Social Hierarchy (1997):

Every social hierarchy claims to be founded on the nature of things. It thus accords itself eternity; it escapes change and the attacks of innovators. Aristotle justified slavery by the ethnic superiority of the Greeks over the barbarians; and today the man who is annoyed by feminist claims alleges that woman is naturally inferior

Hertz's uncompleted doctoral dissertation was entitled Sin and Expiation in Primitive Societies. Sections of it, along with his articles for the L'Année and his correspondence with his wife Alice (née Bauer), have been published. He also published an article (1913) on the festival of Saint Besse, which some consider to be the first anthropological contribution to the study of the Alps.

Hertz was killed by German forces whilst leading his section against German forces at Marcheville. He was posthumously awarded the Croix de Chevalier (Légion d'honneur) for his part in the action.
