= Quadragesima Galliarum =

Roman tariff

Quadragesima Galliarum (lit. "Gallic one-fortieth"), also written XXXX Galliarum or XL Galliarum, was a 2.5% tax charged on trade in the Gallic provinces of the Roman Empire. It was a customs-duty tax on all incoming and outgoing goods in land and sea frontiers in addition to other inland ports. The stopping points on the borders, called Fines or Ad Fines, were the partitions at which this tax was extracted. Collection of the tax was left to the equestrian procurators whose job it was to assess the tax, collect it, and make money available to the armies at the Rhine. Collecting was of greater concern to the procurators of Lugdunensis than to the other Gallic provinces as Lugdunum (now Lyon, France) was the main trading hub of the region.

The bureaucracy surrounding the Quadragesima Galliarum grew in size and complexity over the centuries. Although it had outposts scattered across the country, it was headquartered in Lugdunum. Epigraphy associated with the tax shows the presence of a procurator and staff including: tabularii, a vilicus, and vernae. The locations of these stationes have a pattern of being in ports and key mountain routes. There was even a Quadragesima location in Rome, meaning there might also be a movement of the taxes collected in Gaul to a centralized location in Rome.

== Bibliography ==
- Drinkwater, John (2014), Roman Gaul: The Three Provinces, 58 BC-AD 260, ISBN 9781317750741
- Wightman, Edith Mary (1985), Gallia Belgica, ISBN 9780520052970
- Kuuliala, Jenni; Rantala, Jussi, eds. (2019), Travel, Pilgrimage and Social Interaction from Antiquity to the Middle Ages, ISBN 9780429647703
