= Theban Legion =

Group of Egyptian saints

Saints (of the) Theban Legion
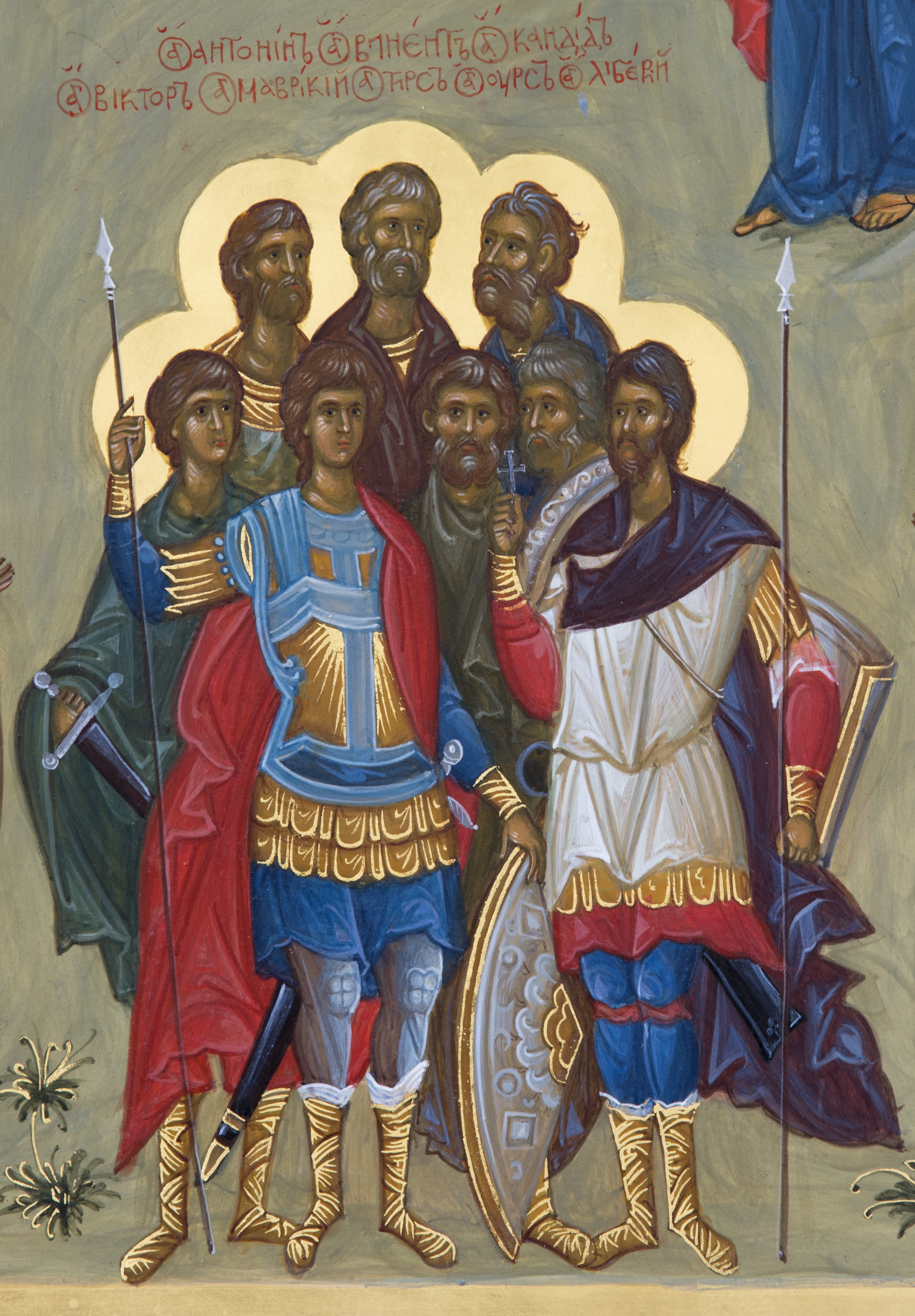
- A detail of a contemporary Russian Orthodox icon depicting certain martyrs of the Theban Legion, including Victor of Solothurn (first from bottom left) and Saint Maurice (second from bottom left)

Martyrs
- Born: 3rd century Thebes, Egypt
- Died: 286 AD; Agaunum (present-day Switzerland)
- Venerated in: Catholic Church; Eastern Orthodox Church; Coptic Orthodox Church
- Feast: September 22
- Attributes: large group of soldiers

The Theban Legion (also known as the Martyrs of Agaunum) was an Egyptian Christian legion of the Roman era. Said to have consisted of "six thousand six hundred and sixty-six men", (Note: 6666 is not the normal number of soldiers in a Roman Legion, and a number that has a diametrically opposite association as the well-known Number of the Beast in the Book of Revelation.) the legion ostensibly was martyred en mass in 286, according to the hagiography (Note: Attempts to demonstrate its historical possibility, such as Donald F. O'Reilly, "The Theban Legion of St. Maurice" Vigiliae Christianae 32.3 (September 1978), pp. 195–207, reveal its continued vitality as an element of Christian legend rather than Christian mythology.) of Maurice, commander of the legion and chief among the Legion's saints. A feast day of the fallen is held on September 22.

== Account ==
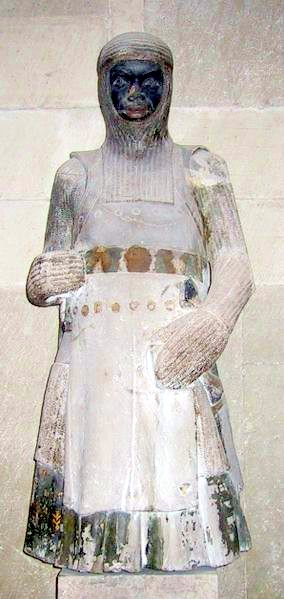
Statue of Saint Maurice, commander of the Theban Legion.

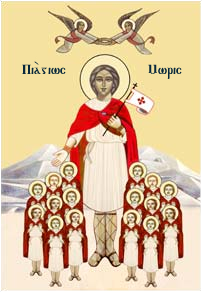
Coptic icon of Theban Legion

According to Eucherius of Lyon, c. 443–450, the Legion was garrisoned at Thebes in Egypt. The Legion was quartered in the East until the emperor Maximian ordered it to march to Gaul, to assist him against the rebels of Burgundy. The Theban Legion (Note: "legio militum, qui Thebaei appellabantur" in Eucherius' letter.) was commanded by Maurice (Mauritius), and captains Candidus, Innocent, and Exuperius, all of whom are venerated as saints. At Saint-Maurice, Switzerland, then called Agaunum, the orders were given—since the Legion had refused to perform sacrifice according to the imperial cult —to decimate it by putting to death a tenth of its men. This act was repeated twice before the entire legion was put to death.

According to a letter written about 450 by Eucherius, Bishop of Lyon, bodies identified as the martyrs of Agaunum were discovered by Theodore (Theodulus), the first historically identified Bishop of Octudurum, who was present at the Council of Aquileia, 381 and died in 391. The basilica he built in their honor attracted the pilgrim trade; its remains can still be seen, part of the abbey begun in the early sixth century on land donated by King Sigismund of Burgundy.

The earliest surviving document describing "the holy Martyrs who have made Agaunum illustrious with their blood" is the letter of Eucherius, which describes the succession of witnesses from the martyrdom to his time, a span of about 150 years. The bishop had made the journey to Agaunum himself, and his report of his visit multiplied a thousandfold the standard formula of the martyrologies:

We often hear, do we not, a particular locality or city is held in high honour because of one single martyr who died there, and quite rightly, because in each case the saint gave his precious soul to the most high God. How much more should this sacred place, Agaunum, be reverenced, where so many thousands of martyrs have been slain, with the sword, for the sake of Christ.

As with many hagiographies, Eucherius' letter to Bishop Salvius reinforced an existing pilgrimage site. Many of the faithful were coming from diverse provinces of the empire, according to Eucherius, devoutly to honor these saints, and (important for the abbey of Agaunum) to offer presents of gold, silver and other things.

In the late 6th century, Gregory of Tours was convinced of the miraculous powers of the Theban Legion though he transferred the event to Cologne, where there was an early cult devoted to Maurice and the Theban Legion:

At Cologne there is a church in which the fifty men from the holy Theban Legion are said to have consummated their martyrdom for the name of Christ. And because the church, with its wonderful construction and mosaics, shines as if somehow gilded, the inhabitants prefer to call it the "Church of the Golden Saints". Once Eberigisilus, who was at the time bishop of Cologne, was racked with severe pains in half his head. He was then in a villa near a village. Eberigisilus sent his deacon to the church of the saints. Since there was said to be in the middle of the church a pit into which the saints were thrown together after their martyrdom, the deacon collected some dust there and brought it to the bishop. As soon as the dust touched Eberigisilus' head, immediately all pain was gone.

The tale of steadfast conduct and faith was embroidered in later retellings and figured in the Golden Legend of Jacobus de Voragine and was included among the persecution of Christians detailed in John Foxe's 1583 Actes and Monuments, an early Protestant stand-by.

Accounts of the moral inculcated by the exemplum of the Theban Legion resonate with the immediate culture of each teller. The miraculous whole-hearted unanimity of the Legion to the last individual, was downplayed by Hugo Grotius, for whom the moral of the Theban Legion was employed to condemn atrocities committed under military orders. For Donald O'Reilly, an apologist for the historicity of the account in 1978, it was "the moral issue of organized violence".

== Interpretations ==
Thebaei is the proper name of one particular military unit, the Legio I Maximiana, also known as Maximiana Thebaeorum, recorded in the Notitia Dignitatum.

According to Samir F. Girgis, writing in the Coptic Encyclopedia, there were two legions bearing the name "Theban", both of them formed by Diocletian sometime after the organization of the original Egyptian legion, stationed at Alexandria. It is not certain which of these was transferred from Egypt to Europe in order to assist Maximian in Gaul.

The monastic accounts themselves do not specifically state that all the soldiers were collectively executed; the twelfth century bishop Otto of Freising (probably influenced by Gregory of Tours' account) wrote in his Chronica de duabus civitatibus that many of the legionaries escaped and only some were executed at Agaunum, and the others apprehended later and put to death both at Bonn and Köln. It is possible that the legion was simply divided during Diocletian's re-organization of units (breaking up legions of 6000 men to create smaller units of 1000), and that some of the soldiers had been executed, and that this was where the story of the legion's destruction originated from. Henri Leclercq suggests that it is quite possible that an incident at Agaunum may have had to do not with a legion, but with a simple detachment.

Johan Mösch, after comparing information from the various chronicles on the events and geography of the martyrdoms of the legionaries, concluded that only a single cohort was martyred at Agaunum. The remainder of the cohorts (battalion sized units of which there were ten to a legion) were either on the march or already stationed along the Roman road that ran from Liguria through Turin and Milan, then across Alps and down the Rhine to Colonia Agrippinensis (Cologne).

L. Dupraz and Paul Müller, by examining the military titles and ranks of the legionnaires and thereby determining the total number of soldiers involved, estimated that the Thebans martyred at Agaunum consisted of but one cohort whose number did not exceed 520 men. Thus the execution of an entire cohors is equivalent to decimation of a legion.

== Historicity ==
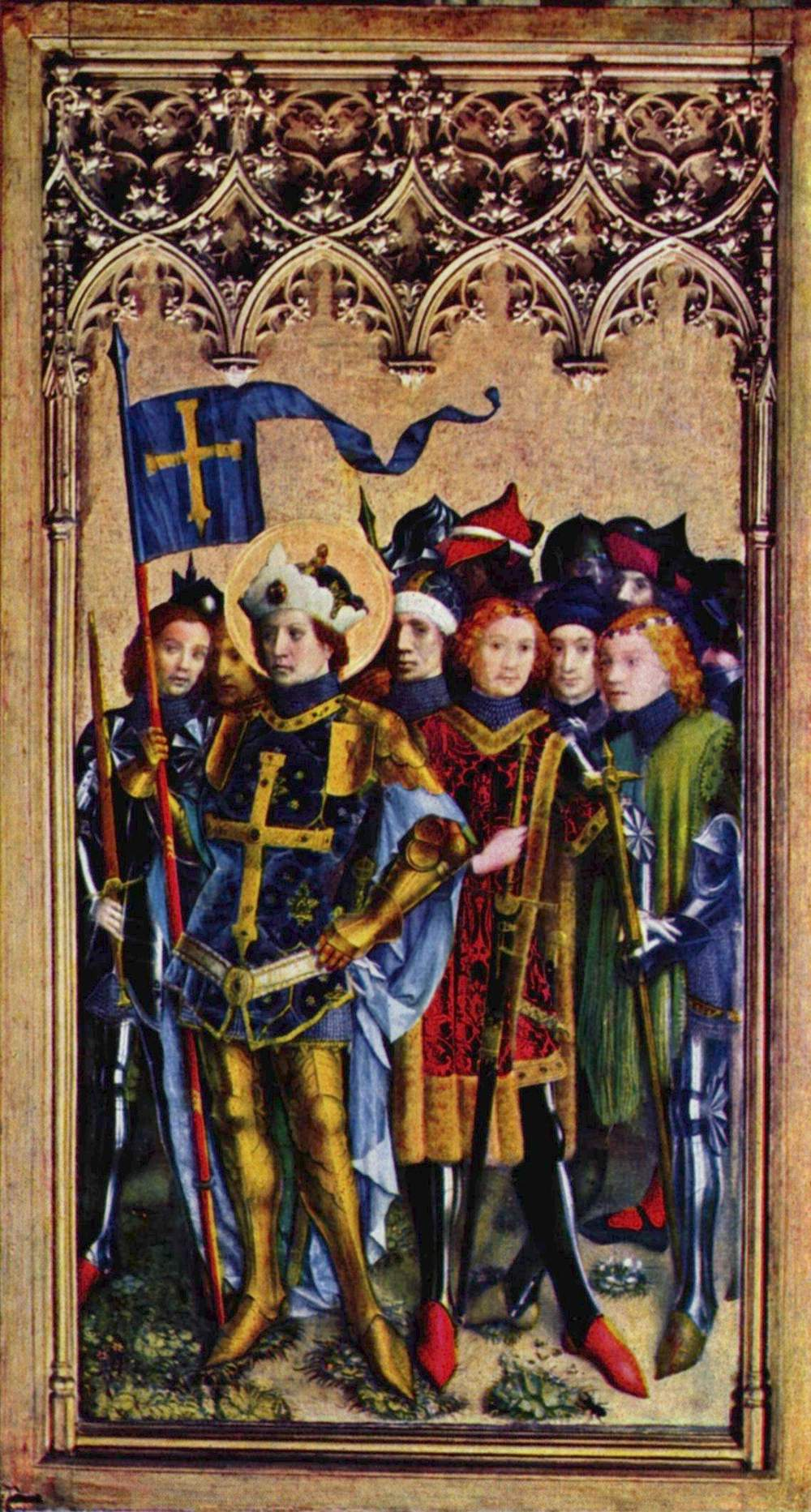
Saint Gereon of the Theban Legion and soldier companions, Stefan Lochner, c. 1440

The account of the Theban legion is regarded as fictitious by certain modern revisionist historians. In 1956 Denis Van Berchem, of the University of Geneva, proposed that Eucherius' presentation of the legend of the Theban legion was a literary production, not based on a local tradition. David Woods, Professor of Classics at the University College Cork, alleges that the model of Maurice and the Theban Legion based on Eucherius of Lyon's letter was a complete fiction.

However, the strength of the account is based on the historical reputation of the earliest Christian monks, the hermits of the Egyptian desert known as the "Desert Fathers", and the followers they inspired during the first two centuries. The persecution of high-ranking Christian nobility under Emperor Valerian following his edict in 258 and the purge of Christians from the military from 284 through 299 under Emperor Diocletian indicate that refusing compliance with emperor worship was the common method for detecting Christians.

Donald F. O'Reilly argued that evidence from coins, papyrus, and Roman army lists supports the story of the Theban Legion. A papyrus dated "in the sixth year of our Lord, the Emperor Caesar Marcus Aurelius Probus Pius Augustus, Tubi sixteenth" (13 January 282 AD), shows rations which would sustain a legion for about three months to be delivered to Panopolis to the "mobilized soldiers and sailors". Coins from Alexandria from the same time period were minted in a style used only when troops for a new legion were leaving port. During the trial of the martyr Maximilian, it was noted that there were Christians serving in the Roman army, and the existence of Theban Christian legionaries in the same units as mentioned in the Notitia Dignitatum was shown.

In 1907, Henri Leclercq noted that the account of Eucherius "has many excellent qualities, historical as well as literary." L. Dupaz countered Denis Van Berchem's assertion by sifting through the stories, carefully matching them with archeological discoveries at Agaunum, thus concluding that the martyrdom is historical and that the relics of the martyrs were brought to Agaunum between 286 and 392 through the office of the bishop Theodore. Thierry Ruinart, Paul Allard, and the editors of the "Analecta Bollandiana" were of opinion that "the martyrdom of the legion, attested, as it is by ancient and reliable evidence, cannot be called in question by any honest mind."

== Saints associated ==
- Attilio
- Maurice
- Alexander of Bergamo
- Bessus
- Candidus
- Cassius and Florentius
- Chiaffredo (Theofredus)
- Constantius
- Defendens
- Exuperius (Exupernis)
- Felix and Regula, the patron saints of Zürich
- Fidelis of Como
- Fortunatus of Casei
- Gereon
- Magnus of Cuneo
- Solutor, Octavius, and Adventor
- Tegulus
- Ursus of Solothurn
- Victor of Xanten
- Victor of Solothurn
- Verena

== Gallery ==
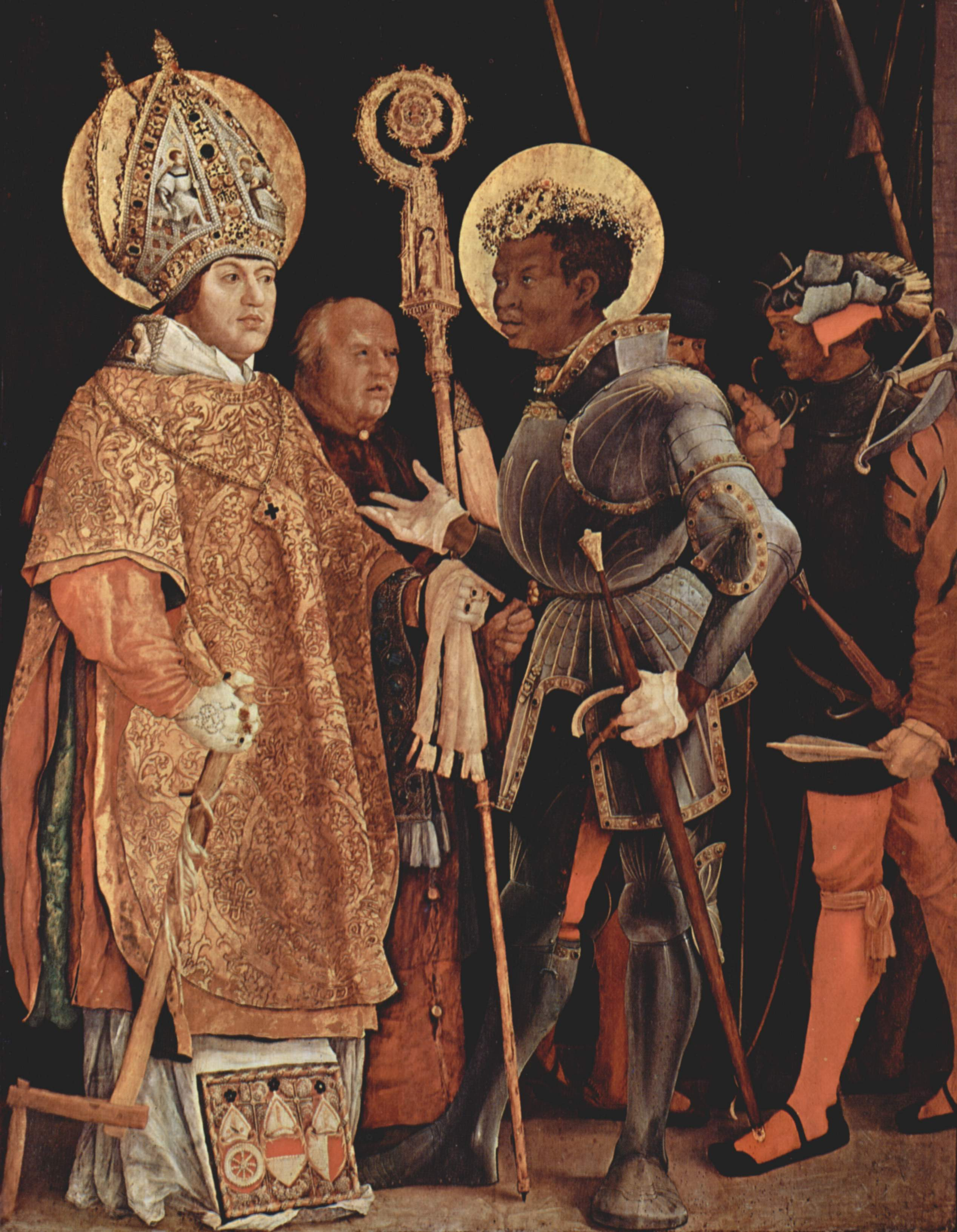
Saint Maurice

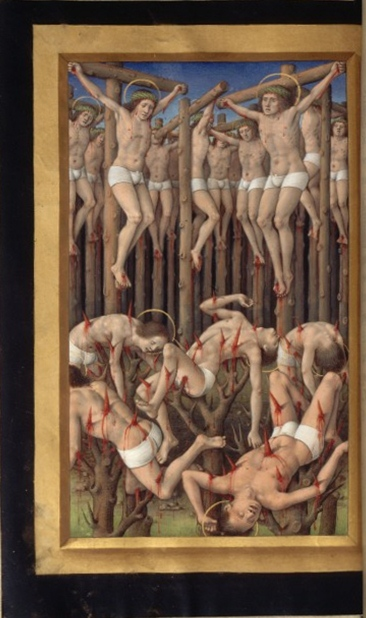
Illustration from the Grandes Heures of Anne of Brittany (1503–08)

Thebaei shield pattern, redrawn from a medieval manuscript of Notitia Dignitatum

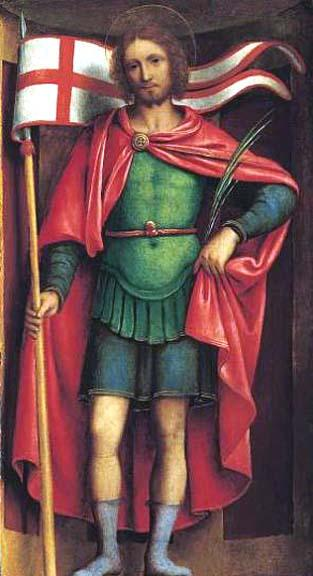
Alexander of Bergamo

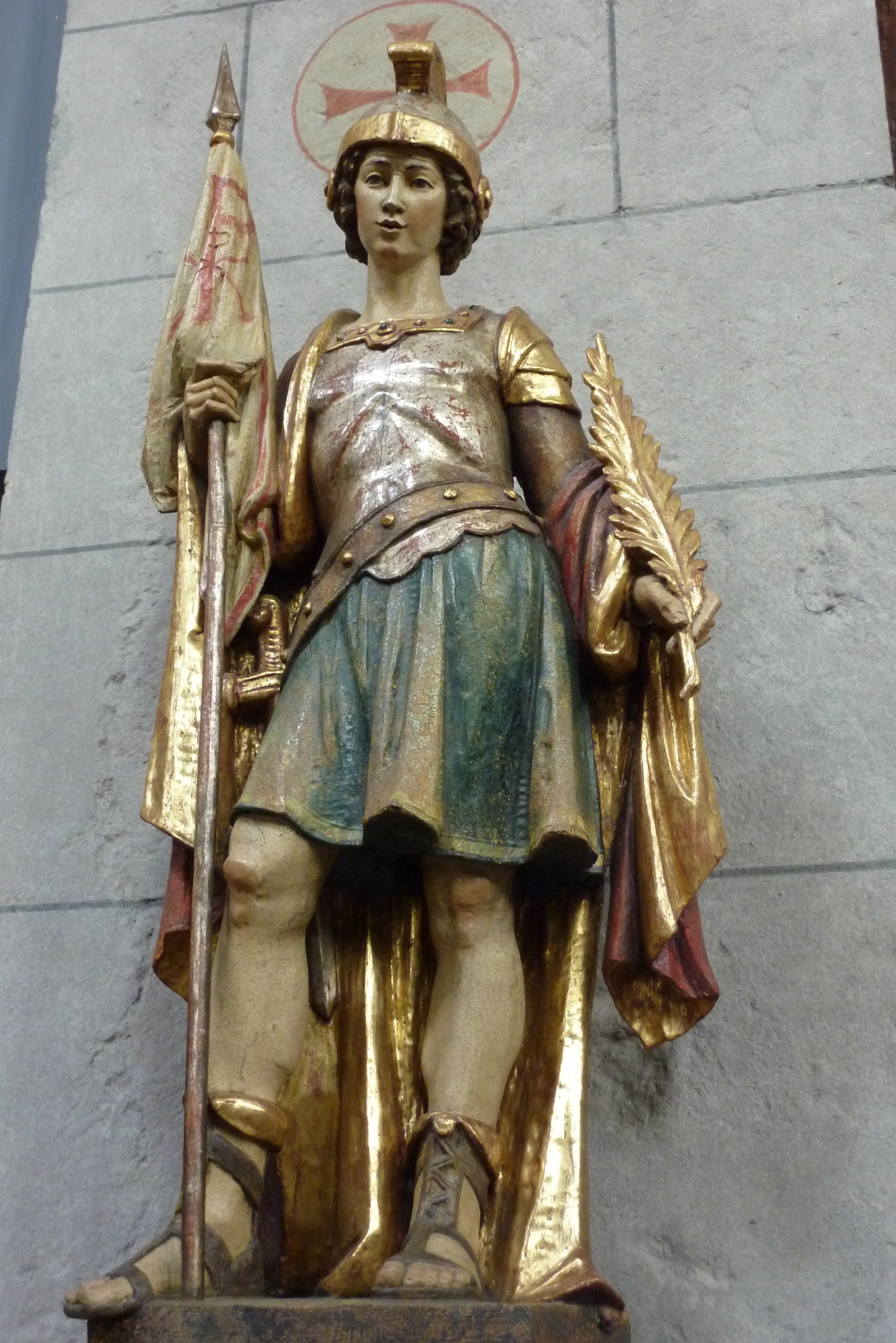
St. Viktor von Xanten

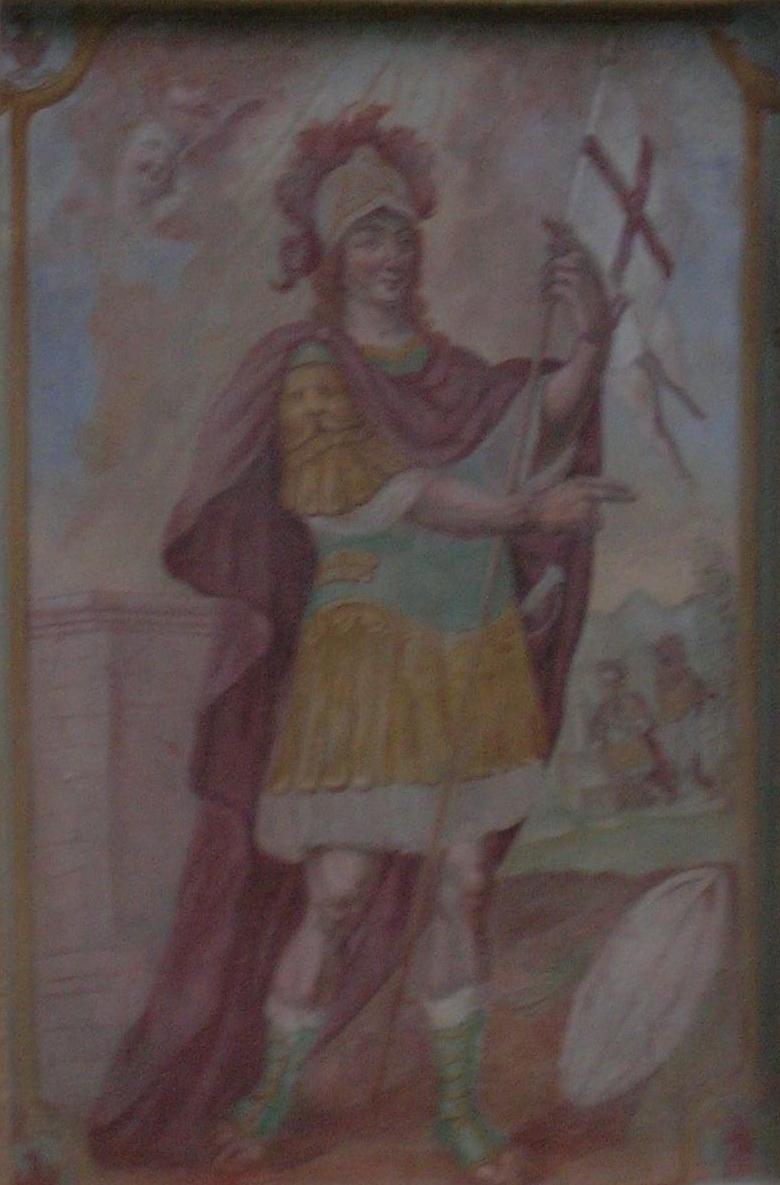
Saint Constantius

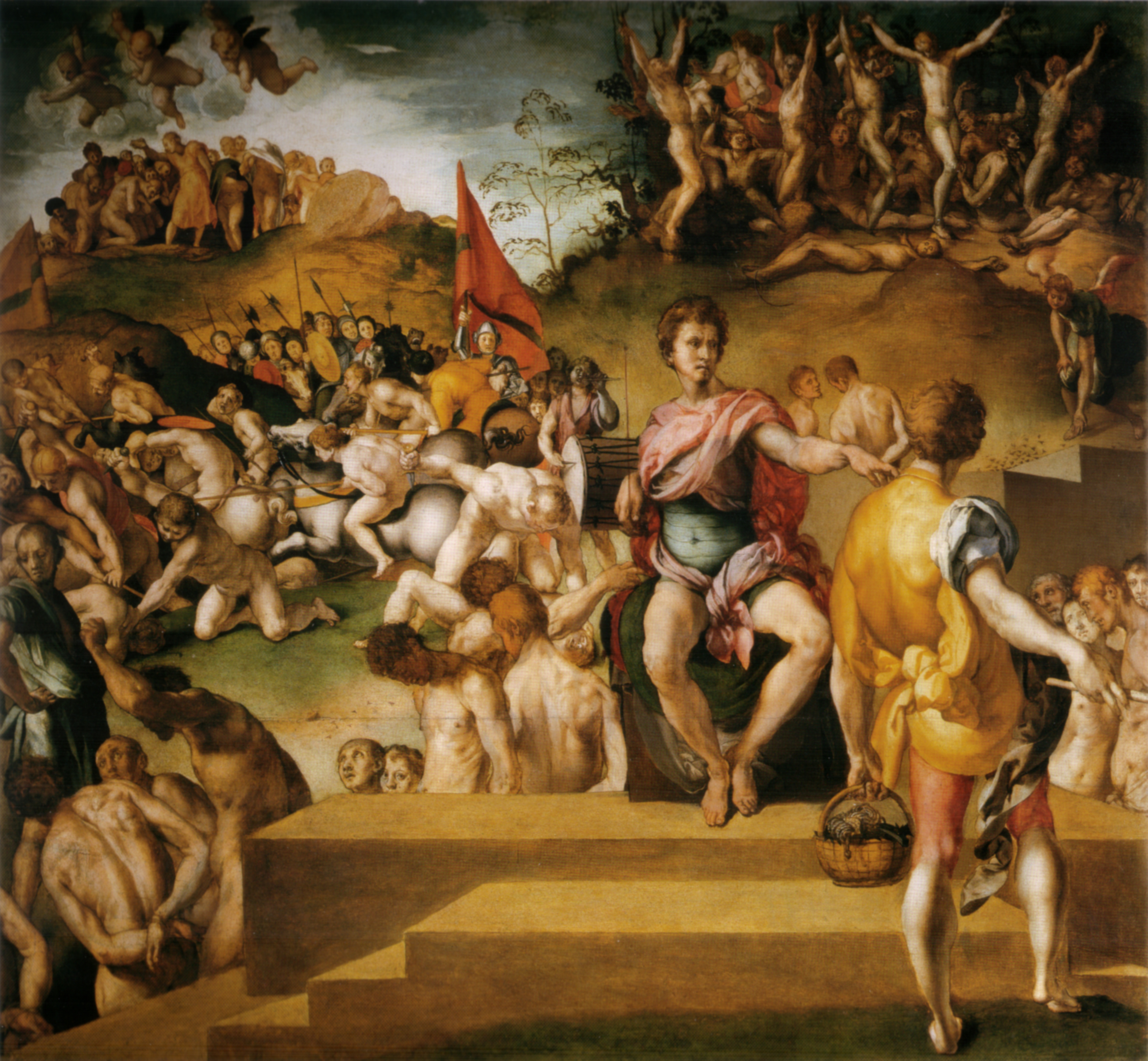
Die zehntausend Märtyrer (1529-30)

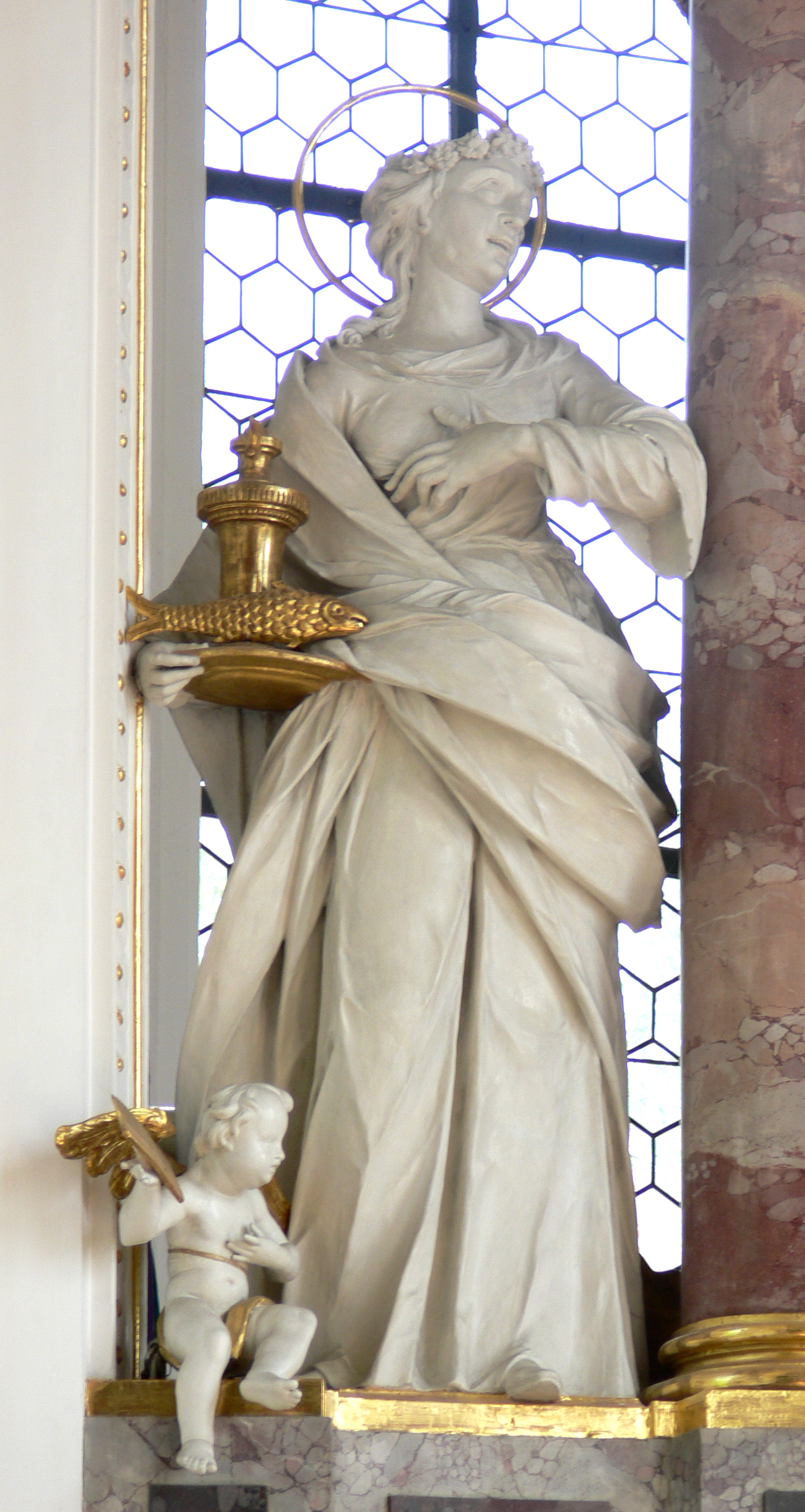
Bad Wurzach, Pfarrkirche St. Verena

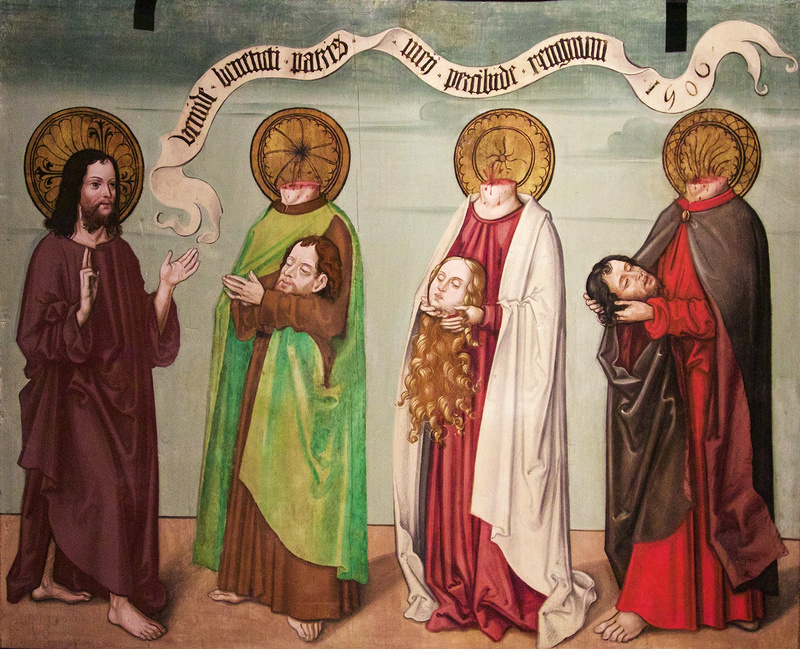
Die Zürcher Stadtheiligen Felix, Regula und Exuperantius (1506)
