= Tegulus =

Saint Tegulus

Martyr
- Died: 3rd century near Montaldo
- Venerated in: Roman Catholic Church
- Feast: October 25
- Attributes: depicted as a soldier bearing a banner with the Mauritian Cross and the palm of martyrdom; spade

Tegulus (Italian: San Tegulo, Tegolo) is venerated as a member of the legendary Theban Legion, whose members were led by Maurice in the 3rd century. The center of Tegulus' cult is at Ivrea. Veneration of Tegulus actually arose at the end of the 10th century, when during the episcopate of Warmondus (Varmondo), the Tegulus's relics were discovered in a sepulcher situated a short distance away from Ivrea. The relics were translated to the cathedral of Ivrea within the city walls, and placed in the chapel of San Giacomo. The relics were later translated, with those of Bessus, to the chapel of Santissimo Sacramento.

According to local tradition, Tegulus survived the decimation of his legion but was eventually beheaded on the road to Montaldo Dora, at the spot later occupied by the chapel of Santa Croce, which was built in the 14th century.

However, nothing certain was known of him, though he may have been a local Christian martyred for his faith during the last imperial persecutions; his cult was linked with that of the Theban Legion to lend antiquity to a local saint about whom nothing was really known. Damiano Pomi theorizes that the relics may have been the remains of a soldier that were mistaken for those of a Christian martyr. The name Tegulus, as Pomi also theorizes, may in fact not have been his name at all, but a reference to the building material commonly used for Roman graves: the tegula or tile.
