= Saint Bessus =

Member of the legendary Theban Legion

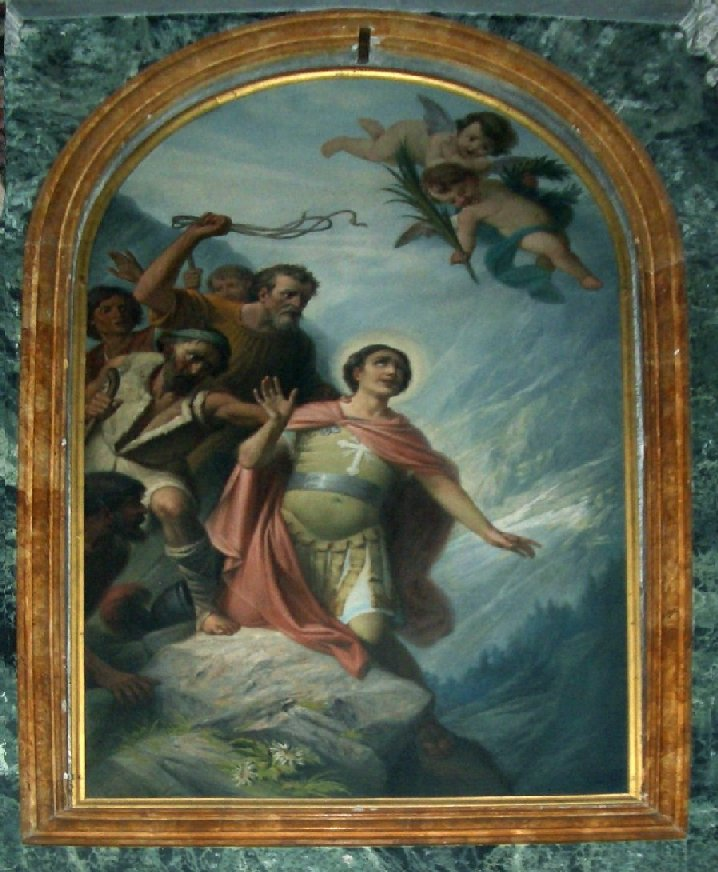
- Fresco of St. Bessus in the Cathedral of Ivrea

Martyr
- Died: 3rd century Piedmont
- Venerated in: Roman Catholic Church
- Feast: August 10; December 1
- Attributes: depicted as a soldier bearing a banner with the Mauritian Cross and the palm of martyrdom; spade; helmet with an ostrich feather
- Patronage: Ivrea (with Sabinus); Campiglia; Valprato Soana; Cogne; protector of soldiers against the dangers of war; also invoked for fertility

Bessus, sometimes Besse, (Italian: San Besso) is venerated as a member of the legendary Theban Legion, whose members were led by Maurice and were martyred for their Christian faith in the 3rd century.

== Legend ==
Evidence for Bessus's existence is confused and uncertain: the name of Bessus is actually identified with two different, semi-legendary saints with the same name: one was a martyred bishop of Ivrea who lived in the eighth century, the other was a hermit with the same name who lived in an Alpine sanctuary near Campiglia in Cogne Valley.

In addition, there are two feast days associated with Bessus that were celebrated at Ivrea: August 10 and December 1. The cult of Saint Bessus may actually represent the Christianization of the cult associated with the Egyptian god Bes, also invoked for fertility. Bessus and Bes, as Fabio Arduino points out, are both associated with an ostrich feather in their iconography.

According to tradition, Bessus survived the decimation of his legion and fled to valleys of Aosta and Cogne. He then dedicated himself to converting the local shepherds to Christianity.

Numerous legends were connected with Bessus. A breviary dating from 1473 states that Bessus was martyred in the following manner: he was invited to a banquet by some Piedmontese who had stolen the cattle that was now being served as a meal. When Bessus discovered this, he denounced the cattle thieves. Angered, the thieves chased him and forced him to jump the cliffs of Monte Fantino. Bessus survived but was then killed by the Roman legionnaires who had slaughtered the Theban Legion at Agaunum. The cliff preserves an imprint associated with Bessus. According to local tradition, the sanctuary dedicated to the saint was constructed on the place of Bessus's martyrdom, which remains today a place of pilgrimage. A different version of the tale states that Bessus hid himself in the Valley of Cogne before being killed by the Roman soldiers.

In 1912, Robert Hertz, a French historian and anthropologist, collected at Cogne a different version of Bessus's death, which was part of an oral tradition passed down from generation to generation. This version states that Bessus was not a soldier of the Theban Legion at all, but a local shepherd who was so pious that God rewarded him with a prosperous, fat, and healthy flock. Envious of his prosperity, some shepherds killed him by forcing him off a cliff.

== Veneration ==
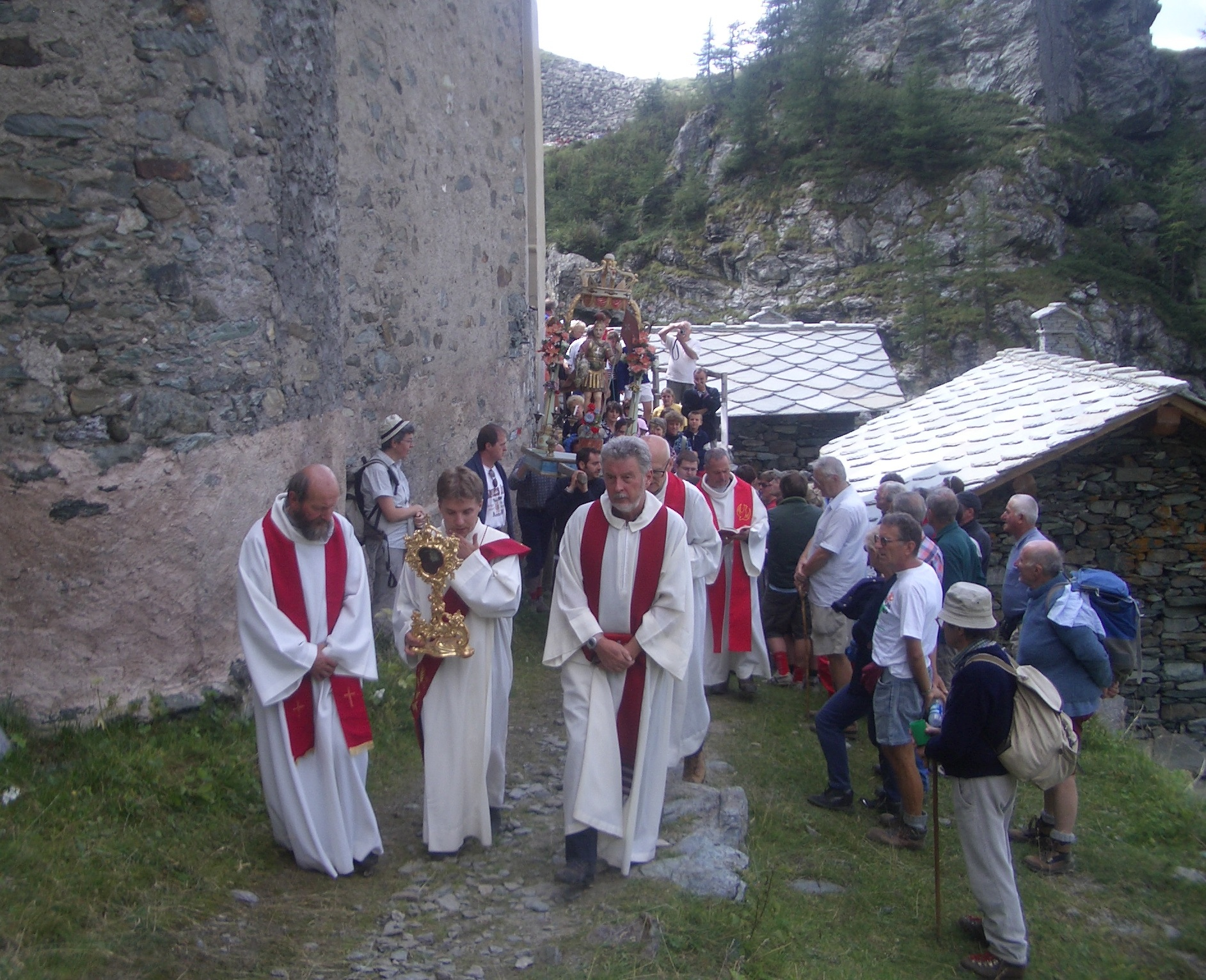
Photo of the traditional St Bessus procession that takes place every year in the Alps near Campiglia, Turin, Italy

Except for the cult of Saint Maurice, veneration for Bessus enjoyed a wider popularity than those associated with other saints of the Theban Legion and remains popular today.

According to a local tradition, Bessus's relics were stolen in the ninth century and taken to Ozegna, to the chapel now occupied by the sanctuary known as Beata Vergine del Convento e del Bosco. Subsequently, during the reign of Arduin of Italy, the relics were translated to the cathedral of Ivrea, where they were placed in a Roman sarcophagus. Today, the relics rest in a lateral altar along with those associated with other martyr saints. Bessus is depicted in an altarpiece by Claudio Francesco Beaumont.

Bessus was considered to be a great thaumaturgus and miracle-worker, and a protector of soldiers against the dangers of war; he was also invoked for fertility.

On August 10, an annual festival and pilgrimage is held in the mountains of Gran Paradiso National Park (Parco Nazionale del Gran Paradiso), in the Val Soana. A statue of the saint is carried to the cliff that is associated with his martyrdom. The honor of carrying the saint was once a cause of dispute between the towns of Cogne and Campiglia. Each town had once been under the jurisdiction of separate dioceses, but in the 13th century, the two towns became part of the diocese of Ivrea.

== Sources ==
- Robert Hertz, "San Besso. Studio di un culto alpestre", in La preminenza della destra e altri saggi, Einaudi, Torino, 1994.
- Hertz, Robert. "Saint Besse: a Study of an Alpine Cult". In Saints and their Cults: Studies in Religious Sociology, Folklore and History. Editor Stephen Wilson. Cambridge: Cambridge University Press, 55–100.
- Marco Reis, "Il mistero di Besso - Tra Cogne e Campiglia le radici di un popolo", Lampi di Stampa, 2006.
