= Agaunum =

Former outpost in Switzerland

Coordinates: 46°12′50″N 7°0′15″E

Agaunum was an outpost in Roman Switzerland, predecessor of the modern city of Saint-Maurice in the canton of Valais, southwestern Switzerland. It was used by the Roman Empire for the collection of the Quadragesima Galliarum. In Christian tradition, Agaunum is known as the place of martyrdom of the Theban Legion.

== Etymology ==
The word Agaunum derives from Gaulish acaunum, meaning "saxum, stone, whetstone". The word acauna also appears in compound nouns relating to "stone", for instance, as related by Pliny. Ultimately, the word stems from the Proto-Indo-European root *h_{2}ekmōn, meaning "stone" in several of the daughter languages.

The name is also attested as a deity called Acauno or Acaunus, leading scholars to argue that in this location there was a probable cult to a river deity.

The name Agaunum is probably at the origin of French toponym Agonès, a commune in southern France.

== In later Christian tradition ==
Agaunum is noted for the fact that the monks at the monastery of Agaunum performed perpetual prayers since its formation in 522 by King Sigismund.

Near Agaunum, in a place still identifiable as a former temple to Mercury, god of travellers, recently excavated behind the abbey's present sanctuary, a revelation led to the discovery of martyrs' bones during the time of Theodore, Bishop of Octudurum (now Martigny), who was in office 350. The etiological narrative explaining the cache of human remains led to the cult of an entire Roman legion, the legendary Theban Legion, martyred at the spot, when this entirely Christian legion refused to sacrifice to the Emperor Maximian and were put to death, by decimation, one out of ten at a time, until all were martyred. Their leader according to the legend was Saint Maurice.

The martyrology was written by Eucherius, Bishop of Lyon, who died in 449. He wrote

"We often hear, do we not, a particular locality or city is held in high honour because of one single martyr who died there, and quite rightly, because in each case the saint gave his precious soul to the most high God. How much more should this sacred place, Agaunum, be reverenced, where so many thousands of martyrs have been slain, with the sword, for the sake of Christ."

Eucherius' telling of the legend reports that the shrine erected by Theodore was already in his time a basilica that was the destination of pilgrims. It lay within the diocese of the Bishop of Sion. The actual site of the martyrdom (or of the cache of bones) was pointed out to pilgrims as the "true place" the vrai lieu, a name it still carries, as Verroliez, according to local etymology.

In 515, the basilica became the center of a monastery built on land donated by Sigismund of Burgundy, the first king of the Burgundians to convert from Arianism to Trinitarian Christianity. His personal conversion was not pressed upon his Burgundian nobles. With the cooperation of the Catholic bishops, Sigismund set out to remake the existing hospice and community that already ministered to pilgrims around the shrine. The result was a unique development in its time: a monastery created ex nihilo under patronage, rather than one that developed organically around the person of a revered monk. Between 515 and 521, Sigismund lavishly endowed his royal foundation, and he transferred monks from other Burgundian monasteries, to ensure that a constant liturgy was kept. The liturgy, known as the laus perennis "perpetual praise" of relays of choirs, was an innovation for Western Europe, imported from Constantinople; it was distinctive to the abbey of St. Maurice and the practice spread widely from there.

St. Maurice's Abbey at Agaunum was the chief abbey of the Burgundian kingdom. In the 10th century, the Saracens of Fraxinet established an outpost near the abbey to control the Alpine passes. In 961, the relics of Maurice and the martyrs were conveyed to the new cathedral being erected at Magdeburg by Emperor Otto I but the abbey has continued to flourish.
