= Dalmatius of Pavia =

Saint Dalmatius of Pavia
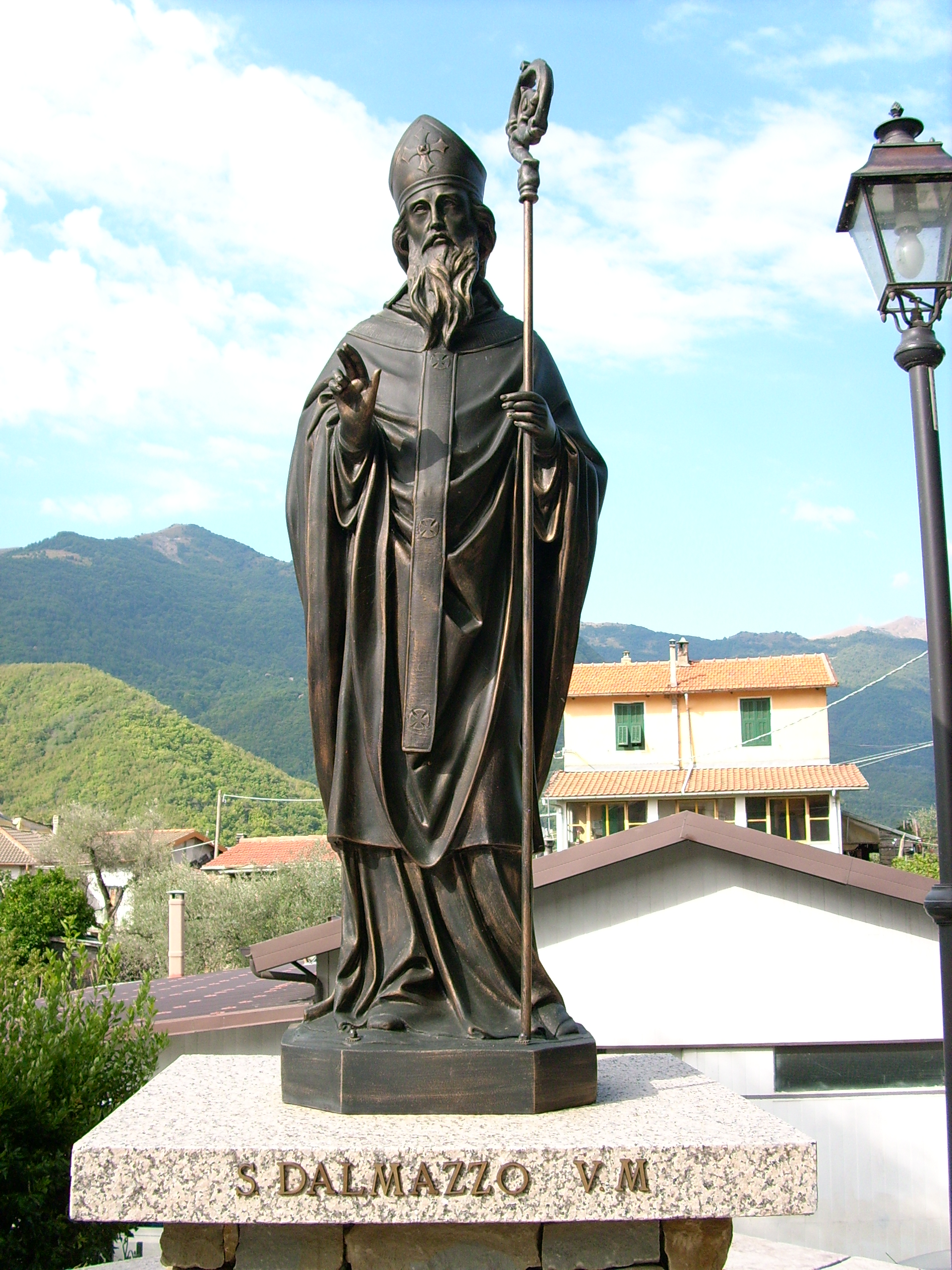
- Born: possibly San Damiano Macra, Italy
- Died: 254 or 304 AD
- Venerated in: Roman Catholic Church
- Feast: 5 December
- Patronage: Borgo San Dalmazzo

Dalmatius of Pavia (Italian: San Dalmazzo, Dalmazio) (died 254 or 304 AD) is venerated as a saint by the Roman Catholic Church. It is possible that Dalmatius was simply a local preacher of northern Italy, but the century in which he lived or the manner in which he died is unknown.

He was venerated at what was called Pedona (present-day Borgo San Dalmazzo). His biography was composed in the 7th or 8th centuries, its author perhaps a Lombard monk of the monastery of Pedona who was drawing from oral tradition.

His biography states that Dalmatius was born at Forum Germarzorum (present-day San Damiano Macra) and became a churchman and evangelizer in Pedona. In the 10th century, when the area of Pedona was devastated during Muslim raids, Dalmatius’ relics were carried to Quargnento, where an inscription on his tomb read: [H]ic requiescit corpus sancti Dalmatii repositum ab Audace episcopo Astensi.

In France, a tradition dating from the 9th century held that he died a martyr. Later legends state that he evangelized many cities of Piedmont, Emilia, and Gaul, and was killed for his faith in 254 or 304 AD.

The Roman Martyrology, based on erroneous episcopal lists, considers Dalmatius a bishop of Pavia and lists his feast day as 5 December.
