= Saint Maurice =

Egyptian Legion leader (AD 250–287)

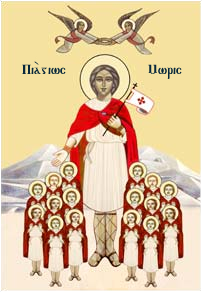
- Coptic icon of St.Maurice and Theban Legion

Martyr
- Born: c. 3rd century Thebes, Egypt
- Died: c. 287; Agaunum, Alpes Graiae et Vallis Poeninae
- Venerated in: Catholic Church; Eastern Orthodox Church; Coptic Orthodox Church
- Canonized: Pre-Congregation
- Major shrine: Abbey of St. Maurice, Agaunum (until 961), Magdeburg Cathedral (961–present)
- Feast: 22 September
- Attributes: banner; soldier; soldier being executed with other soldiers, knight; sub-saharan African in full armour, bearing a standard and a palm; knight in armour with a red cross on his breast, which is the badge of the Order of Saints Maurice and Lazarus
- Patronage: alpine troops; Appenzell Innerrhoden; armies; armorers; Burgundians; Carolingian dynasty; Austria; clothmakers; cramps; dyers; gout; House of Savoy; infantrymen; Lombards; Merovingian dynasty; Piedmont, Italy; Pontifical Swiss Guards; Saint-Maurice, Switzerland; St. Moritz; Sardinia; soldiers; salt miners; Bad Sulza, Germany; swordsmiths; weavers; Holy Roman Emperors

Maurice (also Moritz, Morris, Maurits, or Mauritius; Coptic: Ⲁⲃⲃⲁ Ⲙⲱⲣⲓⲥ) was an Egyptian military leader who headed the legendary Theban Legion of Rome in the 3rd century, and is one of the favourite and most widely venerated saints of that martyred group. He is the patron saint of several professions, locales, and kingdoms.

== Biography ==
=== Early life ===
According to the hagiographical material, Maurice was an Egyptian, born in 250 in Thebes, an ancient city in Upper Egypt. He was brought up in Luxor, in the region of Thebes.

=== Career ===
Maurice became a soldier in the Roman army. He rose through the ranks until he became the commander of the Theban legion, thus leading approximately a thousand men. He was an acknowledged Christian at a time when early Christianity was considered to be a threat to the Roman Empire.

The legion, entirely composed of Christians, had been called from Thebes in Egypt to Gaul to assist Emperor Maximian in defeating a revolt by the bagaudae. The Theban Legion was dispatched with orders to clear the Great St Bernard Pass across the Alps. Before going into battle, they were instructed to offer sacrifices to the pagan gods and pay homage to the emperor. Maurice pledged his men's military allegiance to Rome. He stated that service to God superseded all else. He said that to engage in wanton slaughter was inconceivable to Christian soldiers. He and his men refused to worship Roman deities.

=== Martyrdom ===
When Maximian ordered them to murder local Christians, they refused. Ordering the unit to be punished, Maximian had every tenth soldier killed, a punishment known as decimation. More orders followed; the men refused to comply, as encouraged by Maurice, and a second decimation was ordered. In response to the Theban Christians' refusal to attack fellow Christians, Maximian ordered all the remaining members of the legion to be executed. The place in Switzerland where this occurred, known as Agaunum, is now Saint-Maurice, Switzerland, site of the Abbey of Saint-Maurice.

So reads the earliest account of their martyrdom, contained in the public letter which Bishop Eucherius of Lyon (c. 434–450), addressed to his fellow bishop, Salvius. Alternative versions have the legion refusing Maximian's orders only after discovering innocent Christians had inhabited a town they had just destroyed, or that the emperor had them executed when they refused to sacrifice to the Roman gods.

== Legacy ==
=== Veneration ===
Maurice became a patron saint of the German Holy Roman Emperors. In 926, Henry the Fowler (919–936), even ceded the present Swiss canton of Aargau to the abbey, in return for Maurice's lance, sword and spurs. The sword and spurs of Maurice were part of the regalia used at coronations of the Austro-Hungarian emperors until 1916, and among the most important insignia of the imperial throne (although the actual sword dates from the 12th century). In addition, some of the emperors were anointed before the Altar of Saint Maurice at St. Peter's Basilica. In 929, Henry the Fowler held a royal court gathering (Reichsversammlung) at Magdeburg. At the same time, the Mauritius Kloster in honour of Maurice was founded. In 961, Otto I, Holy Roman Emperor, was building and enriching Magdeburg Cathedral, which he intended for his own tomb. To that end,

in the year 961 of the Incarnation and in the 25th year of his reign, in the presence of all of the nobility, on the vigil of Christmas, the body of St. Maurice was conveyed to him at Regensburg along with the bodies of some of the saint's companions and portions of other saints. Having been sent to Magdeburg, these relics were received with great honour by a gathering of the entire populace of the city and of their fellow countrymen. They are still venerated there, to the salvation of the homeland.

Maurice is traditionally depicted in full armour, in Italy emblazoned with a red cross. In folk culture he has become connected with the legend of the Holy Lance, which he is supposed to have carried into battle; his name is engraved on the Holy Lance of Vienna, one of several relics claimed as the spear that pierced Jesus' side on the cross. Maurice gives his name to the town St. Moritz as well as to numerous places called Saint-Maurice in French-speaking countries. The Indian Ocean island state of Mauritius was named after Maurice, Prince of Orange, and not directly after Maurice himself.

Over 650 religious foundations dedicated to Saint Maurice can be found in France and other European countries. In Switzerland alone, seven churches or altars in Aargau, six in the Canton of Lucerne, four in the Canton of Solothurn, and one in Appenzell Innerrhoden can be found (in fact, his feast day is a cantonal holiday in Appenzell Innerrhoden). Particularly notable among these are the Church and Abbey of Saint-Maurice-en-Valais, the Church of Saint Moritz in the Engadin, and the Monastery Chapel of Einsiedeln Abbey, where his name continues to be greatly revered. Several orders of chivalry were established in his honour as well, including the Order of the Golden Fleece, the 1434 Order of Saint Maurice, and the Order of Saints Maurice and Lazarus. Additionally, fifty-two towns and villages in France have been named in his honour.

Maurice was also the patron saint of a Catholic parish and church in the 9th Ward of New Orleans, including part of the town of Arabi in St. Bernard Parish. The church was constructed in 1856, but was devastated by the winds and flood waters of Hurricane Katrina on 29 August 2005; the copper-plated steeple was blown off the building. The church was subsequently deconsecrated in 2008, and the local diocese put it up for sale in 2011. By 2014, a local attorney had purchased the property for a local arts organization, after which the building served as both an arts venue and the worship space for a Baptist church that had been displaced following the hurricane.

On 19 July 1941, Pope Pius XII declared Maurice to be the patron saint of the Italian Army's Alpini (mountain infantry corps). The Alpini have celebrated Maurice's feast every year since then.

There are several Coptic Orthodox churches named for him.

=== Apparition ===
The Our Lady of Laus apparitions included an apparition of Saint Maurice. He appeared in an antique episcopal vestment and told Benoîte Rencurel that he was the one to whom the nearby chapel was dedicated, that he would fetch her some water (before drawing some water out of a well she had not seen), that she should go down to a certain valley to escape the local guard and see the Blessed Virgin Mary, mother of Jesus, and that Mary was both in Heaven and could appear on Earth.

=== Patronage ===
Maurice is the patron saint of the Duchy of Savoy and of the Valais, as well as of soldiers, swordsmiths, armies, and infantrymen. In 1591, Charles Emmanuel I, Duke of Savoy, arranged the triumphant return of part of the relics of Saint Maurice from the monastery of Agaune in Valais.

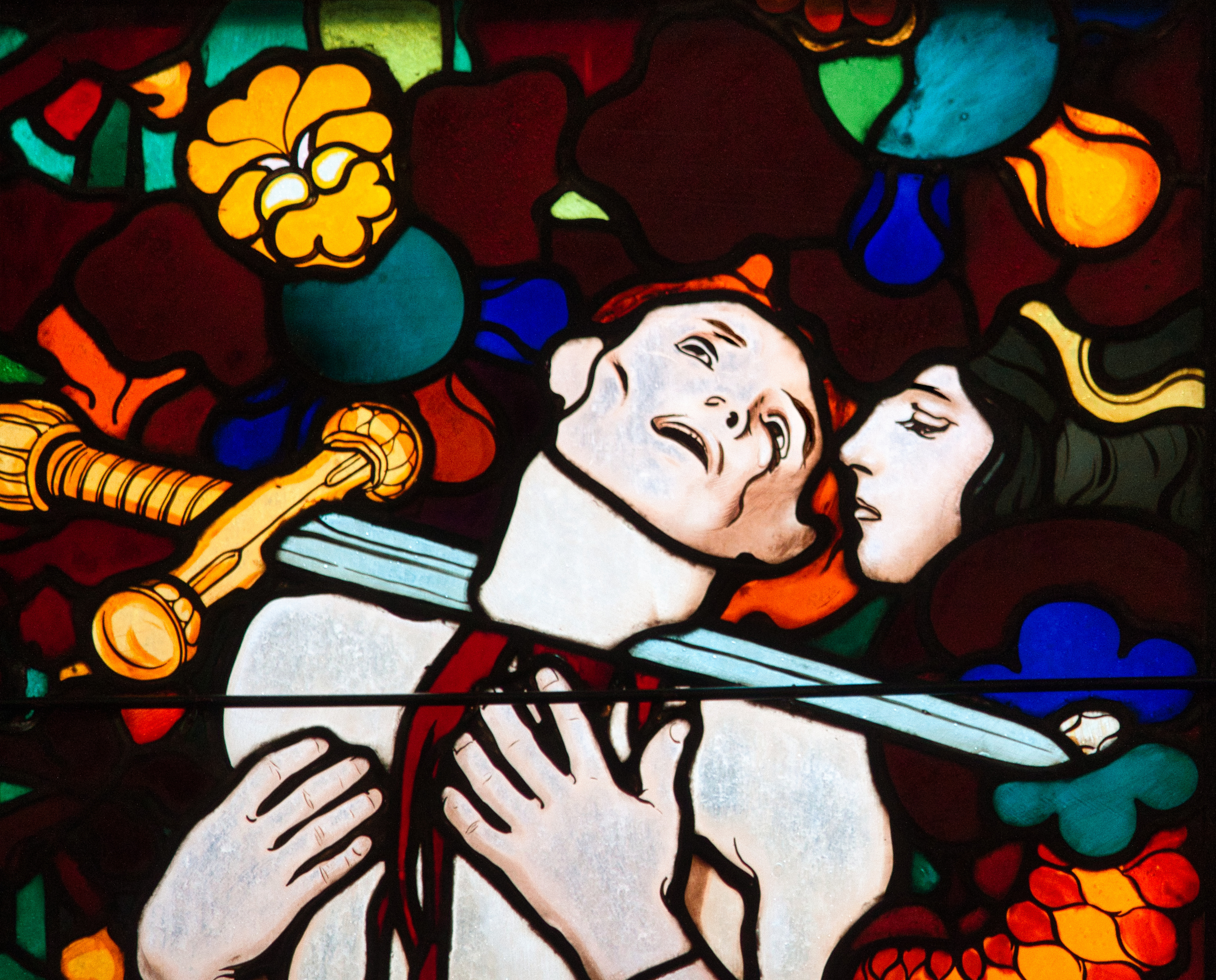
The dying Saint Maurice, detail of a stained-glass by Józef Mehoffer, 1898–1899, Fribourg Cathedral

He is also the patron saint of weavers and dyers. Manresa (Spain), Piedmont (Italy), Montalbano Jonico (Italy), Schiavi di Abruzzo (Italy), Stadtsulza (Germany) and Coburg (Germany) have chosen Maurice as their patron saint as well. Maurice is also the patron saint of the Brotherhood of Blackheads, a historical military society of unmarried merchants in present-day Estonia and Latvia. In September 2008, certain relics of Maurice were transferred to a new reliquary and rededicated in Schiavi di Abruzzo (Italy).

He is also the patron saint of the town of Coburg in Bavaria, Germany. He is shown there as a man of colour, especially on manhole covers as well as on the city coat of arms. There he is called "Coburger Mohr" ('Coburg Black man').

=== Portrayal and modern debates on race ===
In the modern era, there has been debate surrounding Saint Maurice's race and physical depictions. The earliest surviving work portraying Maurice as a dark-skinned African dates from the 13th century. Before the 13th century, he was usually depicted with European features. The oldest surviving image that depicts Saint Maurice as a dark-skinned man in knight's armour was sculpted in the mid-13th century for Magdeburg Cathedral; there it is displayed next to the grave of Otto I, Holy Roman Emperor. Jean Devisse, author of the book The Image of the Black in Western Art, laid out the documentary sources for the saint's popularity and documented it with illustrative examples. The Magdeburg cathedral in the 13th century presumably had other images of Maurice that did not visibly represent him as being an African, though with the exception of a statue from c. 1220, none has survived.

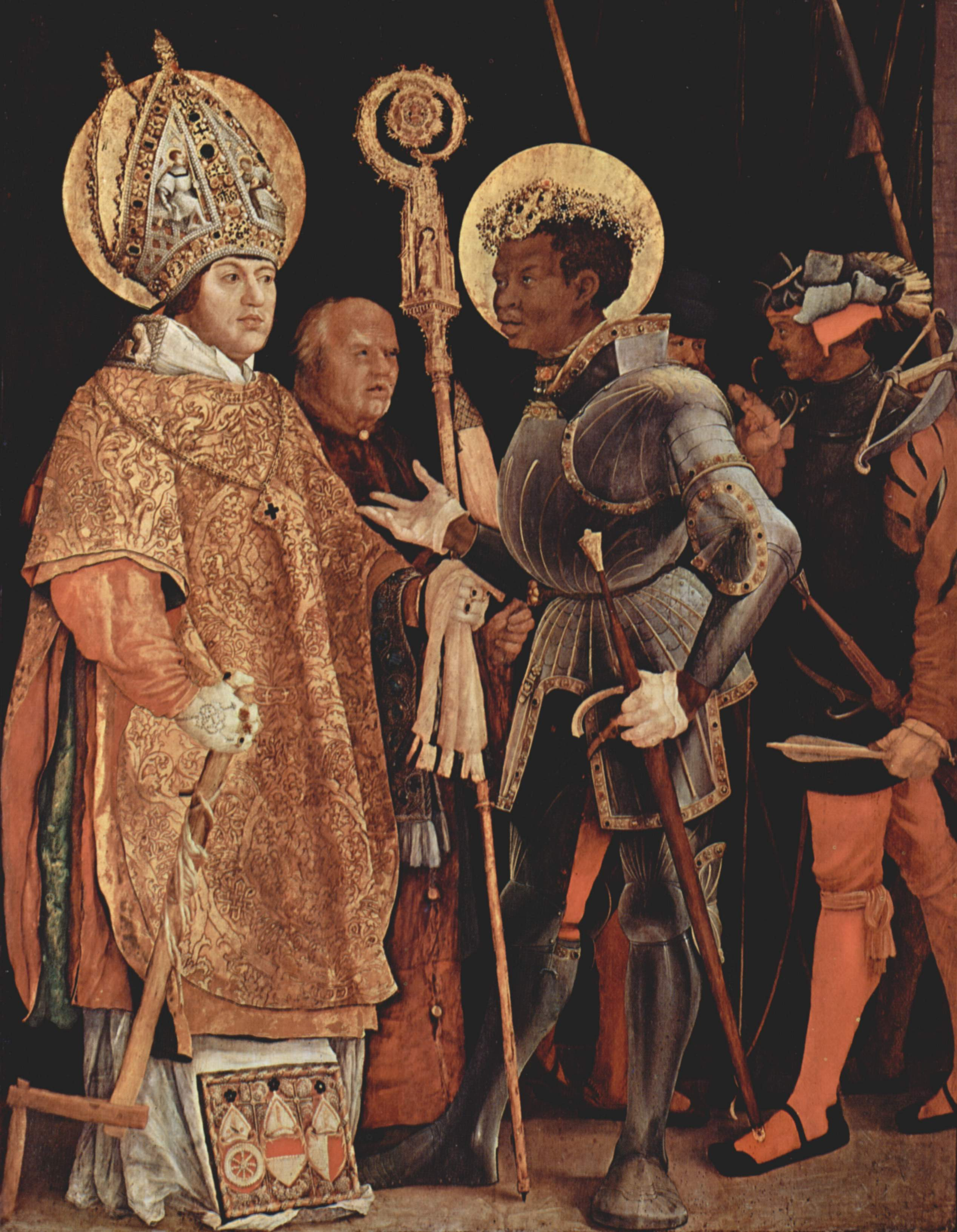
Saint Maurice (center) by Matthias Grünewald c. 16th century

During the 11th century, before art of Maurice began depicting him as visibly dark-skinned, he was seen as "the symbol of the Germanic offensive against the Slavs". Devisse argues that Frederick II likely initiated the "black St. Maurice" trope, around 1240-1250. As a military saint, Maurice played an important role for the Holy Roman Empire during the Crusades, most of which had been failing at the time. Frederick seemingly wanted to symbolically state that, even though Christians cannot reconquer Africa, Christianity once triumphed in Africa before the arrival of Islam. Given that Maurice was a Christian, his foreignness could not be depicted with iconographic vocabulary such as insignia on shields or headdresses. As such, Maurice was "turned" into a "black" or darker-skinned man to specify his geographic provenance with racial characteristics of color and physiognomy. Paul Kaplan, agreeing with Devisse's thesis, additionally argues that Frederick II also wanted to propagandistically emphasize how "All races are equal before God, and... the Christian mission is universal", and also that one of his goals was to "advance his claims to global rule by promoting the visibility of his most strikingly 'different' subjects".

Gude Suckale-Redlefsen gives another view on the subject, arguing instead that it was not Frederick who transformed Maurice into a "black man", but rather archbishop Alfred I of Käfernburg, after 1220, or his half-brother Wilbrand later on. Suckale-Redlefsen reasons that Alfred had read the Kaiserchronik which described Maurice as "the leader of the [black] Moors". As such, according to her, Alfred took cognizance of this new idea of the saint as a dark-skinned Moor and commissioned a "black St. Maurice" in the context of a new building program after a fire devastated the old cathedral in 1207. Devisse had also raised this idea but had eventually dismissed it because of "what [he] assumed would be negative psychological reactions on the part of the populace to the sudden arrival of a black African saint substituting for the old Maurice at an inopportune moment, and also because of the financial costs involved".

Images of the saint died out in the mid-16th century. Suckale-Redlefsen suggests that this was due to the developing Atlantic slave trade. "Once again, as in the early Middle Ages, the color black had become associated with spiritual darkness and cultural 'otherness'". There is an oil-on-wood painting of Maurice by Lucas Cranach the Elder (1472–1553) in New York's Metropolitan Museum of Art.

The city of Coburg's coat of arms honoured the town's patron saint, Saint Maurice, since they were granted in 1493. In 1934, the Nazi government forbade any glorification of the "Black" race, and they replaced the coat of arms with one depicting a vertical sword with a Nazi swastika on the pommel. The original coat of arms was restored in 1945 at the end of World War II. Today, the silhouette of Saint Maurice can be found mainly on manhole covers as well as the city coat of arms.

== History ==
There is a difference of opinion among researchers as to whether or not the story of the Theban Legion is based on historical fact, and if so, to what extent. The account by Eucherius of Lyon is classed by Bollandist Hippolyte Delehaye among the historical romances. Donald F. O'Reilly, in Lost Legion Rediscovered, argues that evidence from coins, papyrus, and Roman army lists support the story of the Theban Legion.

Denis Van Berchem, of the University of Geneva, proposed that Eucherius' presentation of the legend of the Theban legion was a literary production, not based on a local tradition. The monastic accounts themselves do not specifically state that all the soldiers were collectively executed; the 12th-century bishop Otto of Freising wrote in his Chronica de duabus civitatibus that many of the legionaries escaped and only some were executed at Agaunum, though the others were later apprehended and put to death at Galliae Bonna and Colonia Aggripina.

In 1907, Henri Leclercq noted that the account of Eucherius "has many excellent qualities, historical as well as literary." L. Dupaz countered Denis Van Berchem's assertion by sifting through the stories, carefully matching them with archeological discoveries at Agaunum, thus concluding that the martyrdom is historical and that the relics of the martyrs were brought to Agaunum between 286 and 392 through the office of the bishop Theodore. Thierry Ruinart, Paul Allard, and the editors of the "Analecta Bollandiana" were of opinion that "the martyrdom of the legion, attested, as it is by ancient and reliable evidence, cannot be called in question by any honest mind."

== Gallery ==
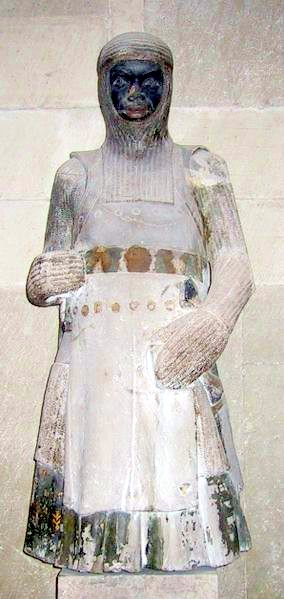
13th Century statue of Saint Maurice from the Magdeburg Cathedral that bears his name.

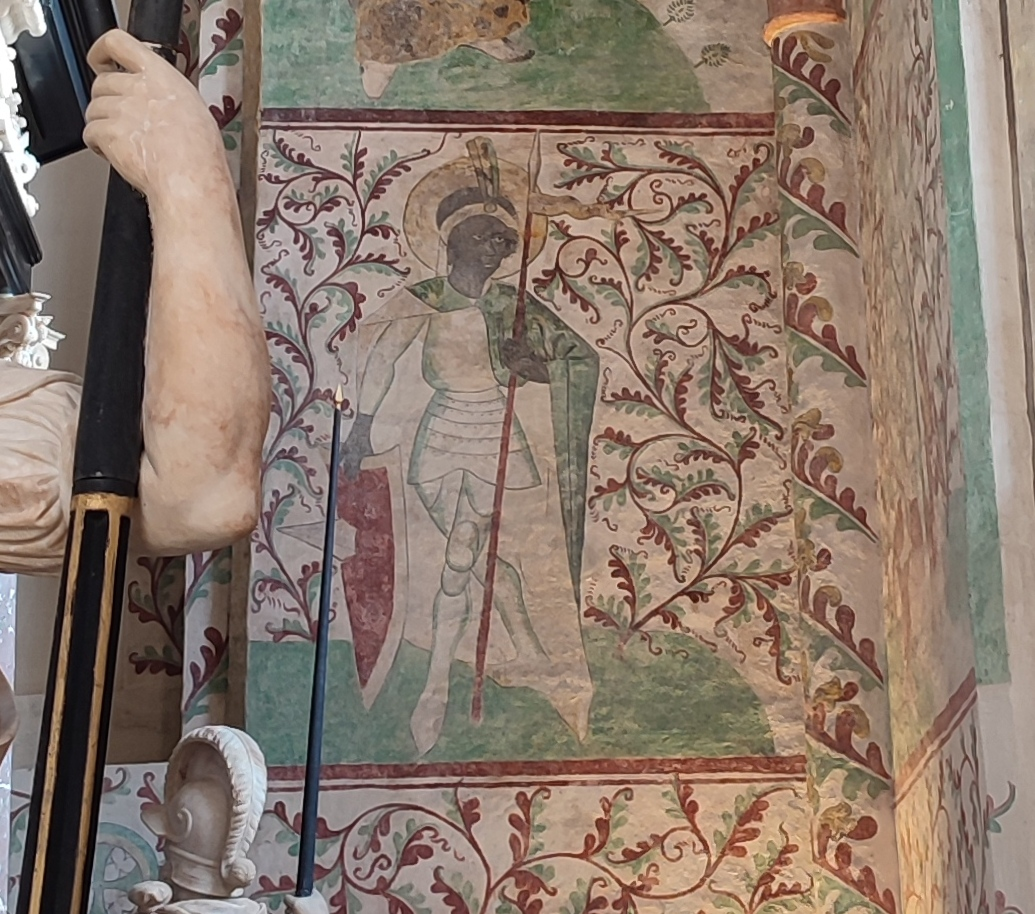
Saint Mauritius on the wall behind one of the statues of the grave of King Frederik II of Denmark in Roskilde Cathedral.

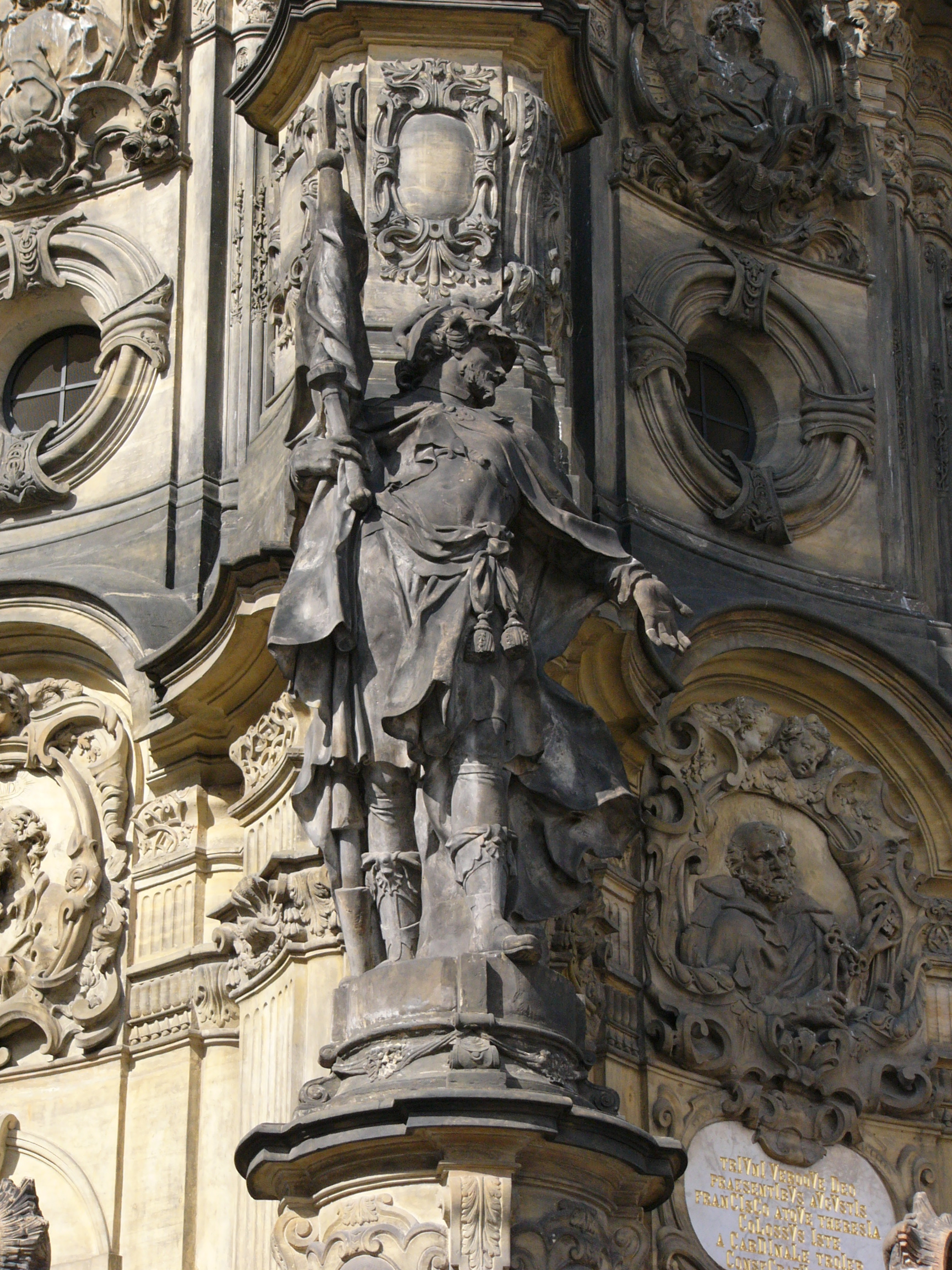
18th century Baroque sculpture of Saint Maurice on the Holy Trinity Column in Olomouc, the Czech Republic.

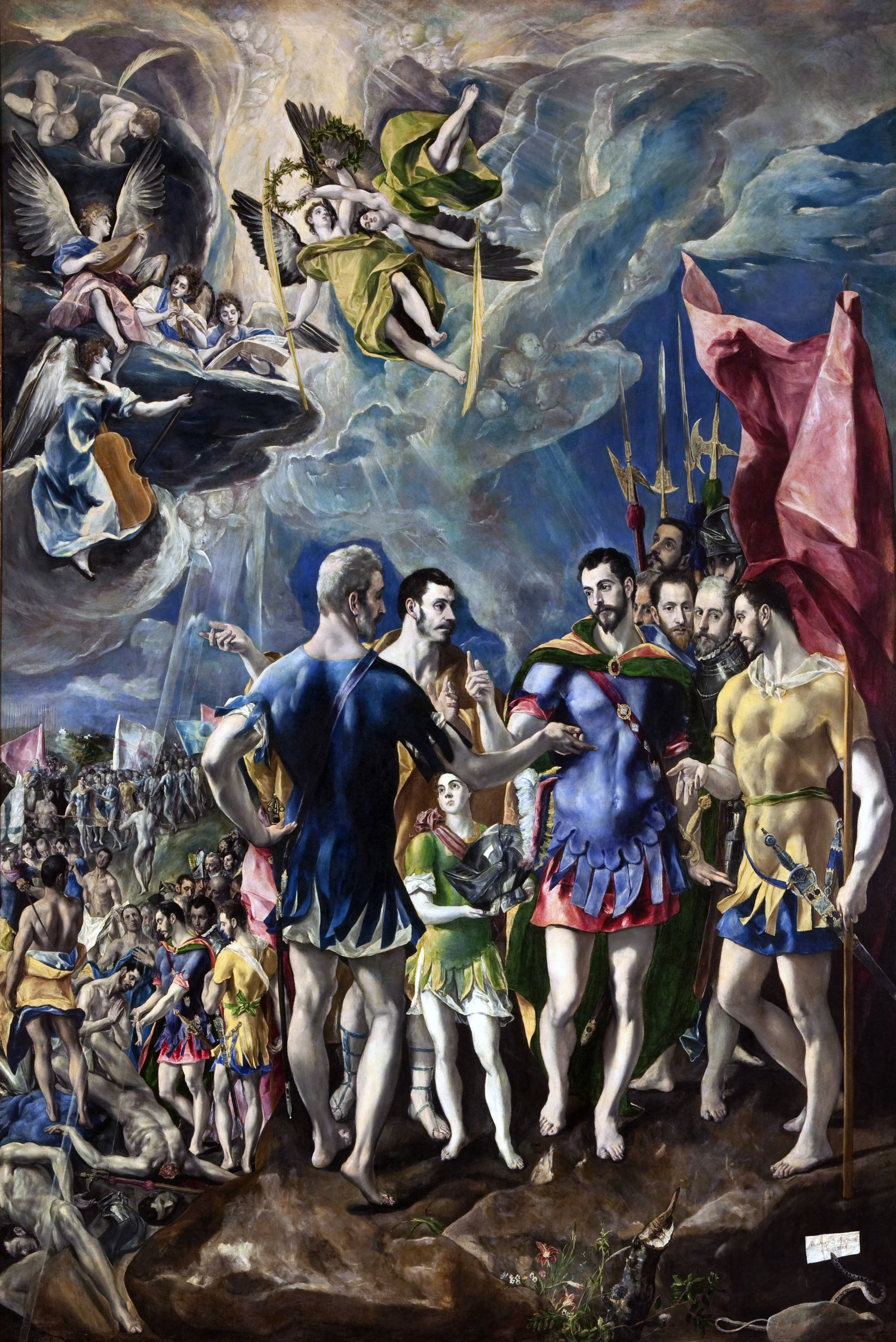
The Martyrdom of Saint Maurice by El Greco. 1580-82

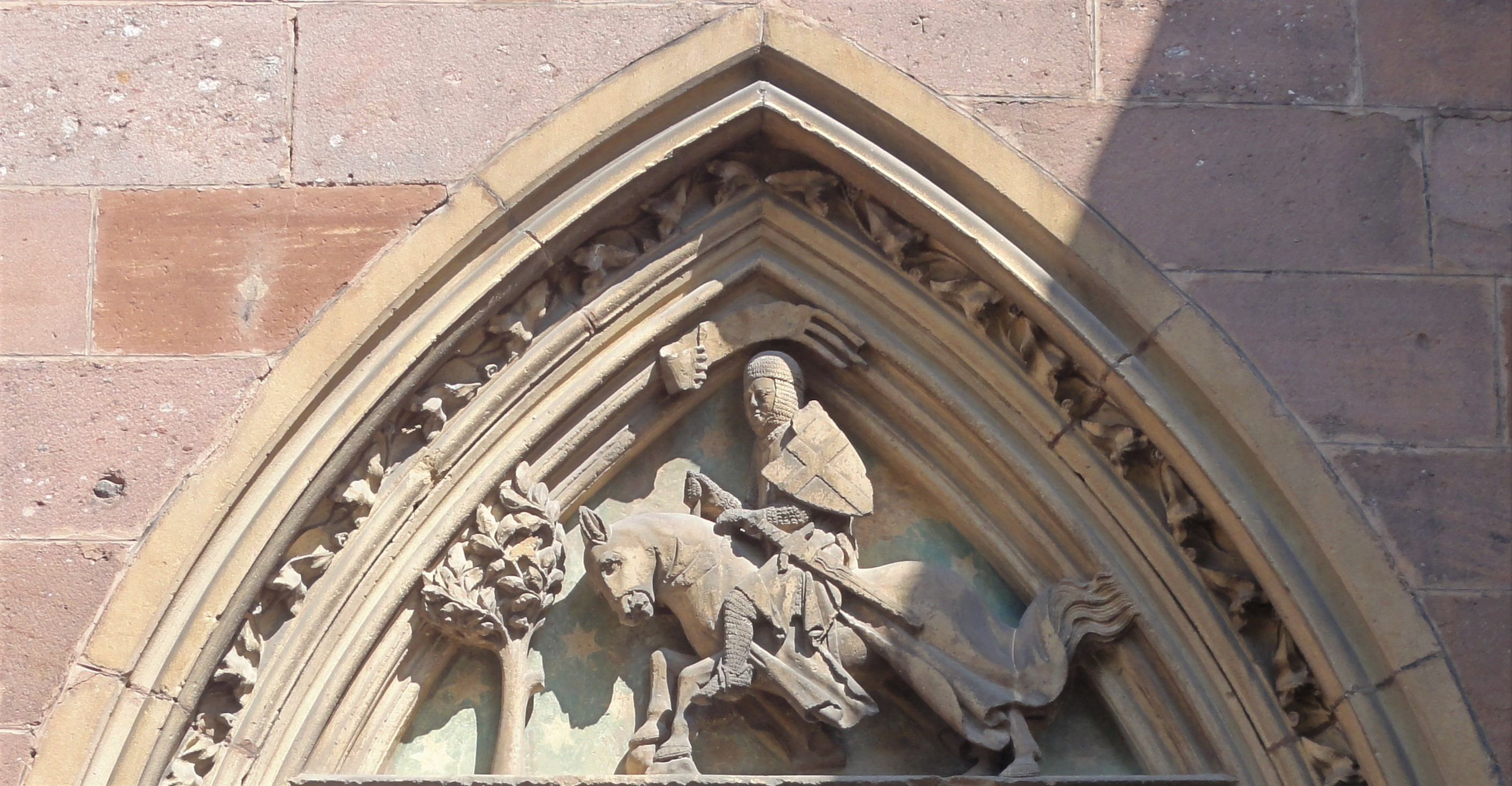
Gothic relief (ca. 1320) of Saint Maurice on horseback on Église Saint-Maurice in Soultz-Haut-Rhin, France.

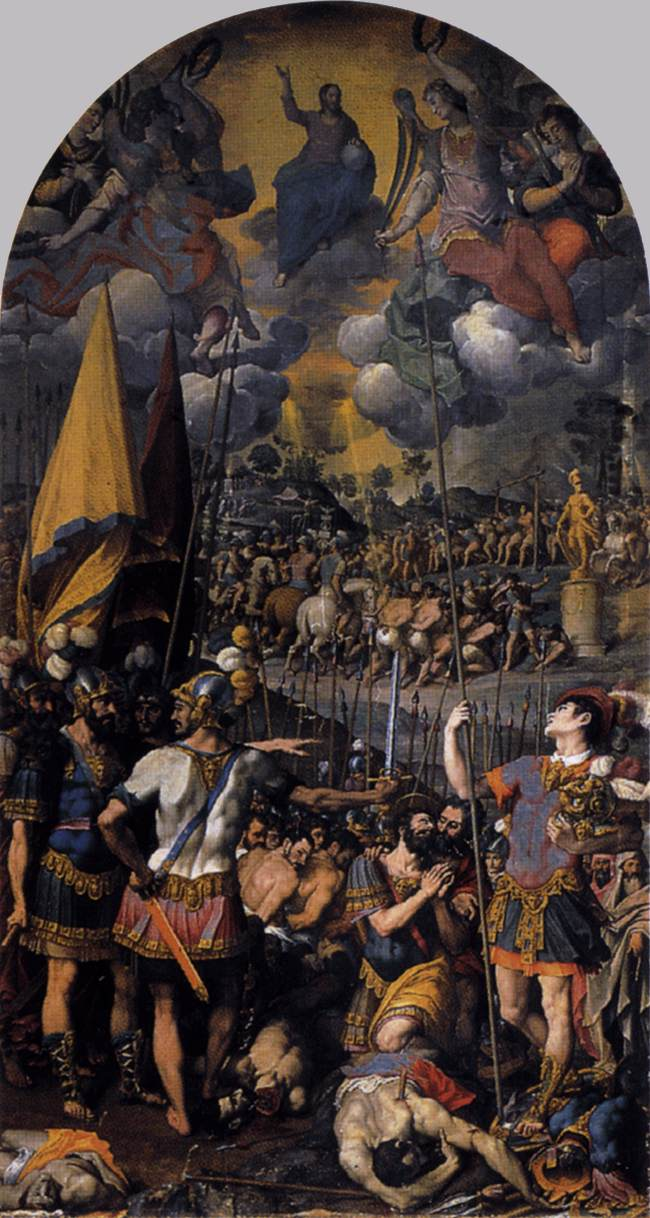
The Martyrdom of Saint Maurice by Romulo Cincinato. 1583. Oil on canvas, 540 x 288 cm, Monasterio de San Lorenzo, El Escorial, Spain. Cincinato placed stronger emphasis on the execution scene, which has been brought into the foreground.

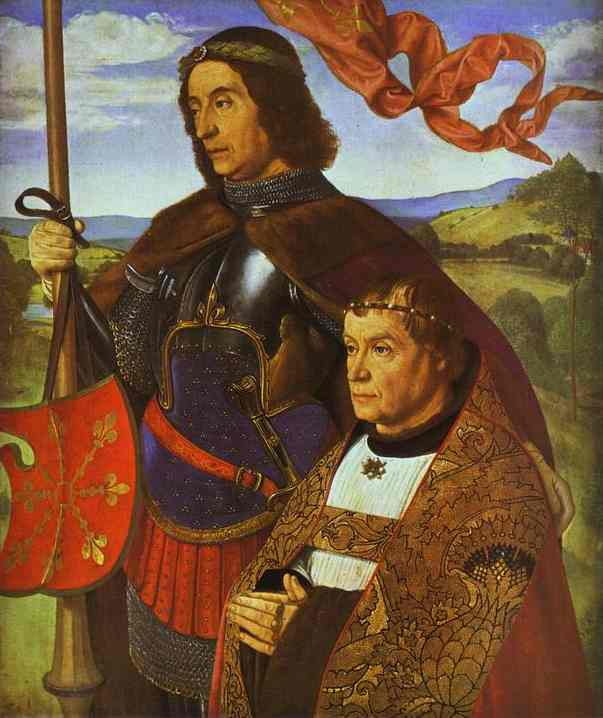
Jean Hey, Portrait of Francis de Chateaubriand Presented by St. Maurice. c. 1500. Tempera on wood. Glasgow Museums and Art Galleries, Glasgow, UK.

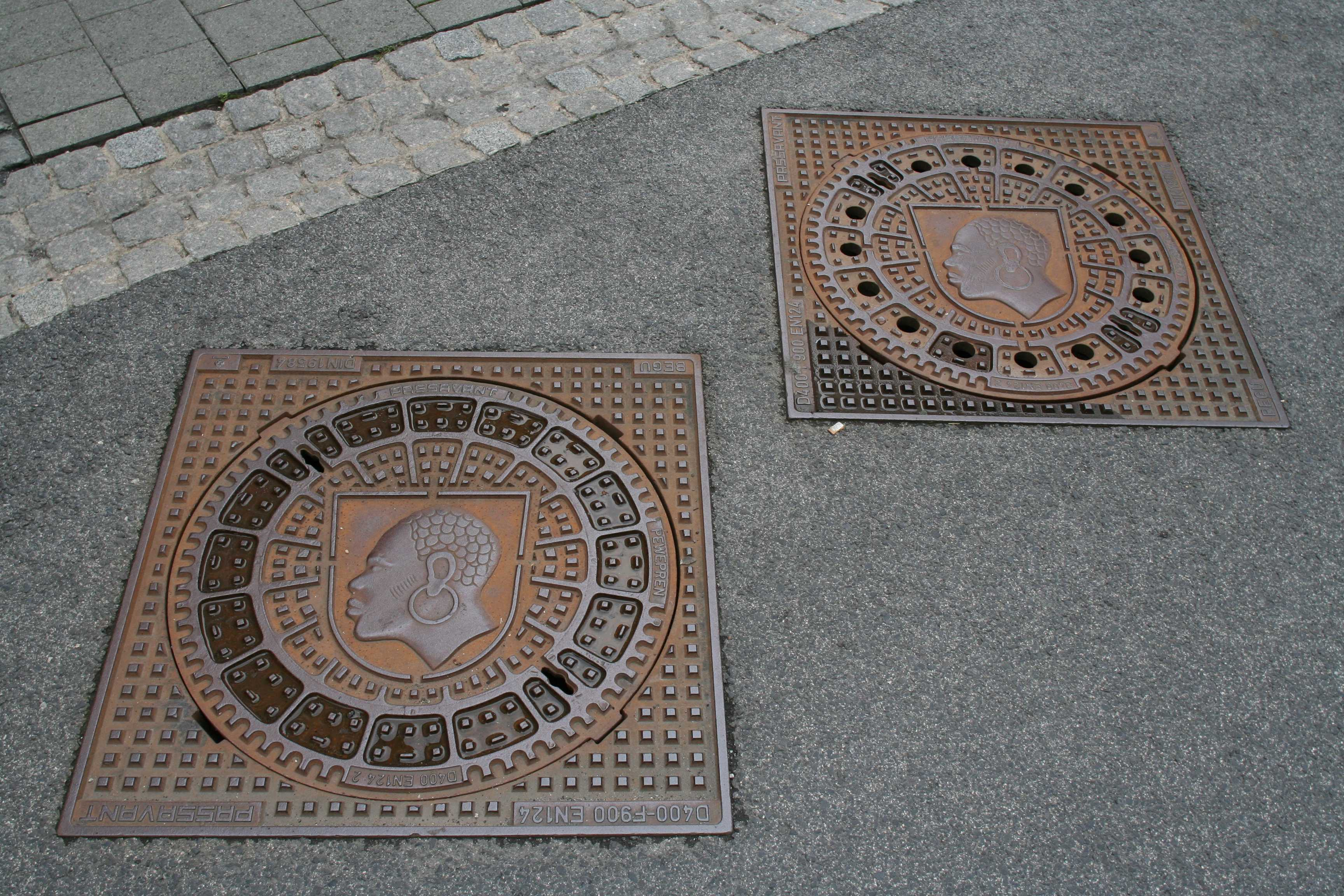
St. Maurice as depicted on the City of Coburg's Coat of Arms.

The coat of arms of the city of Coburg, Germany

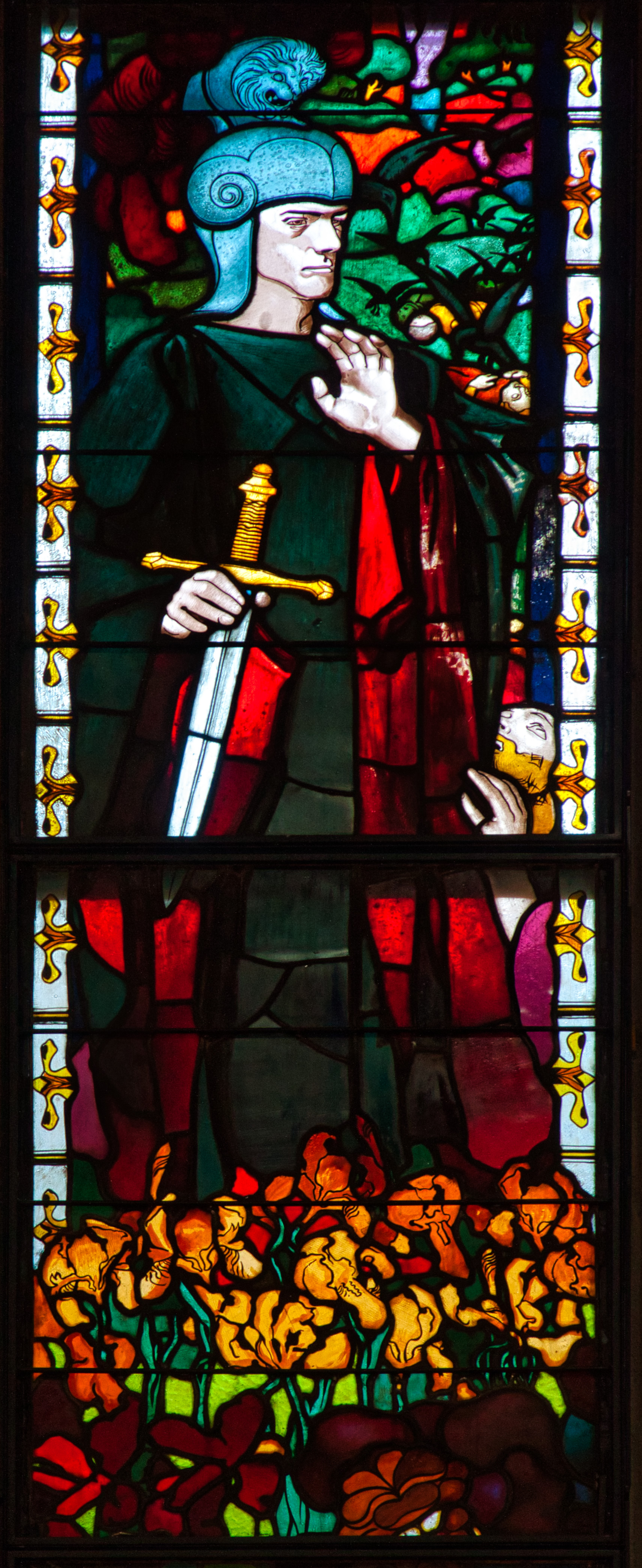
Saint Maurice, stained-glass by Józef Mehoffer, 1898–1899, in the cathedral in Fribourg

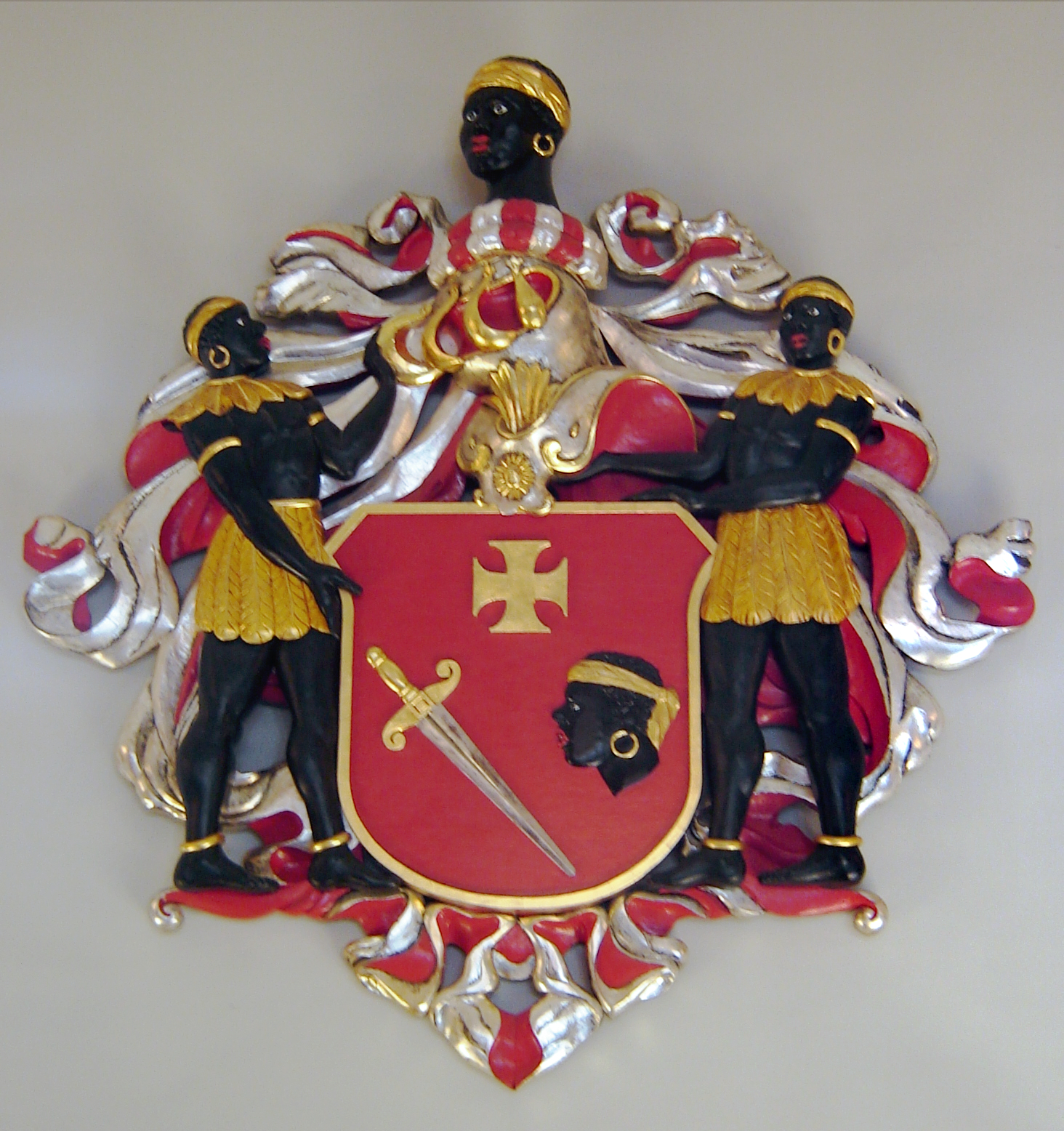
The coat of arms of the Brotherhood of Blackheads, featuring Saint Maurice.
